= List of statutory instruments of the United Kingdom, 2005 =

This is an incomplete list of statutory instruments of the United Kingdom in 2005.

== 1–100 ==
- The Financial Services and Markets Act 2000 (Gibraltar) (Amendment) Order 2005 (S.I. 2005 No. 1)
- The Education (Co-ordination of Admission Arrangements) (Primary Schools) (England) (Amendment) Regulations 2005 (S.I. 2005 No. 2)
- The Social Security (Incapacity Benefit Work-focused Interviews) Amendment Regulations 2005 (S.I. 2005 No. 3)
- The St Bernadette's Primary School (Designation as having a Religious Character) Order 2005 (S.I. 2005 No. 4)
- The Education (Student Support) (No. 2) Regulations 2002 (Amendment) Regulations 2005 (S.I. 2005 No. 5)
- The Retained Organs Commission (Abolition) Order 2005 (S.I. 2005 No. 6)
- The Asylum Seekers (Reception Conditions) Regulations 2005 (S.I. 2005 No. 7)
- The East Midlands Parkway Station (Land Acquisition) Order 2005 (S.I. 2005 No. 8)
- The Asylum Support (Amendment) Regulations 2005 (S.I. 2005 No. 11)
- The Charges for Inspections and Controls (Amendment) Regulations 2005 (S.I. 2005 No. 12)
- The Information Tribunal (National Security Appeals) Rules 2005 (S.I. 2005 No. 13)
- The Information Tribunal (Enforcement Appeals) Rules 2005 (S.I. 2005 No. 14)
- The Immigration (Procedure for Marriage) Regulations 2005 (S.I. 2005 No. 15)
- The Gas Act 1986 (Exemption) Order 2005 (S.I. 2005 No. 16)
- The Incidental Catches of Cetaceans in Fisheries (England) Order 2005 (S.I. 2005 No. 17)
- The European Communities (Recognition of Professional Qualifications) (First General System) Regulations 2005 (S.I. 2005 No. 18)
- The National Health Service (Travel Expenses and Remission of Charges) Amendment Regulations 2005 (S.I. 2005 No. 26)
- The Motor Vehicles (Wearing of Seat Belts) (Amendment) Regulations 2005 (S.I. 2005 No. 27)
- The National Health Service (General Medical Services Contracts) (Personal Medical Services Agreements) and (Pharmaceutical Services) (Amendment) Regulations 2005 (S.I. 2005 No. 28)
- The Social Security (Claims and Payments and Payments on account, Overpayments and Recovery) Amendment Regulations 2005 (S.I. 2005 No. 34)
- The Education (Information About Individual Pupils) (Wales) (Amendment) Regulations 2005 (S.I. 2005 No. 35 (W.2))
- Rheoliadau Addysg (Gwybodaeth am Ddisgyblion Unigol) (Cymru) (Diwygio) 2005 (S.I. 2005 Rhif 35 (Cy.2))
- The General Teaching Council for Wales (Additional Functions) Order 2005 (S.I. 2005 No. 36 (W.3))
- Gorchymyn Cyngor Addysgu Cyffredinol Cymru (Swyddogaethau Ychwanegol) 2005 (S.I. 2005 Rhif 36 (Cy.3))
- The Supply of Extended Warranties on Domestic Electrical Goods Order 2005 (S.I. 2005 No. 37)
- The Health and Social Care (Community Health and Standards) Act 2003 Commencement (No. 5) Order 2005 (S.I. 2005 No. 38 (C.1))
- The John Wesley School (Designation as having a Religious Character) Order 2005 (S.I. 2005 No. 39)
- The Licensing Act 2003 (Transitional provisions) Order 2005 (S.I. 2005 No. 40)
- The Licensing Act 2003 (Personal licences) Regulations 2005 (S.I. 2005 No. 41)
- The Licensing Act 2003 (Premises licences and club premises certificates) Regulations 2005 (S.I. 2005 No. 42)
- The Licensing Act 2003 (Licensing authority's register) (other information) Regulations 2005 (S.I. 2005 No. 43)
- The Licensing Act 2003 (Hearings) Regulations 2005 (S.I. 2005 No. 44)
- The Common Agricultural Policy Single Payment Scheme (Set-aside) (Wales) Regulations 2005 (S.I. 2005 No. 45 (W.4))
- Rheoliadau Cynllun Taliad Sengl y Polisi Amaethyddol Cyffredin (Neilltir) (Cymru) 2005 (S.I. 2005 Rhif 45 (Cy.4))
- The Extradition Act 2003 (Parties to International Conventions) Order 2005 (S.I. 2005 No. 46)
- The Immigration (European Economic Area) (Amendment) Regulations 2005 (S.I. 2005 No. 47)
- The Social Security Pensions (Home Responsibilities) (Amendment) Regulations 2005 (S.I. 2005 No. 48)
- The South-west Territorial Waters (Prohibition of Pair Trawling) (Amendment) Order 2005 (S.I. 2005 No. 49)
- The Blood Safety and Quality Regulations 2005 (S.I. 2005 No. 50)
- The Education (School Performance Information) (England) (Amendment) Regulations 2005 (S.I. 2005 No. 51)
- The Education (Student Support) Regulations 2005 (S.I. 2005 No. 52)
- The Enterprise Act 2002 (Judicial Pensions and Retirement Act 1993) (Consequential Amendment) Order 2005 (S.I. 2005 No. 53)
- The Gender Recognition Act 2004 (Commencement) Order 2005 (S.I. 2005 No. 54 (C.2))
- The Regulatory Reform (Unsolicited Goods and Services Act 1971) (Directory Entries and Demands for Payment) Order 2005 (S.I. 2005 No. 55)
- The Transport for London (Consequential Provisions) Order 2005 (S.I. 2005 No. 56)
- The Financial Services and Markets Act 2000 (Collective Investment Schemes) (Amendment) Order 2005 (S.I. 2005 No. 57)
- The Education (School Attendance Targets)(England) Regulations 2005 (S.I. 2005 No. 58)
- The Water Industry (Charges) (Vulnerable Groups) (Amendment) Regulations 2005 (S.I. 2005 No. 59)
- The A7 Trunk Road (Carlisle City Boundary to The Scottish Border) (De-Trunking) Order 2005 (S.I. 2005 No. 60)
- The Tax Credits (Provision of Information) (Function Relating to Employment and Training) Regulations 2005 (S.I. 2005 No. 66)
- The General Teaching Council for Wales (Additional Functions) (Amendment) Order 2005 (S.I. 2005 No. 68 (W.6))
- Gorchymyn Cyngor Addysgu Cyffredinol Cymru (Swyddogaethau Ychwanegol) (Diwygio) 2005 (S.I. 2005 Rhif 68 (Cy.6))
- The General Teaching Council for Wales (Functions) (Amendment) Regulations 2005 (S.I. 2005 No. 69 (W.7))
- Rheoliadau Cyngor Addysgu Cyffredinol Cymru (Swyddogaethau) (Diwygio) 2005 (S.I. 2005 Rhif 69 (Cy.7))
- The Plant Health (Amendment) (Wales) Order 2005 (S.I. 2005 No. 70 (W.8))
- Gorchymyn Iechyd Planhigion (Diwygio) (Cymru) 2005 (S.I. 2005 Rhif 70 (Cy.8))
- The Public Audit (Wales) Act 2004 (Commencement No. 1) Order 2005 (S.I. 2005 No. 71 (W.9) (C.3))
- Gorchymyn Deddf Archwilio Cyhoeddus (Cymru) 2004 (Cychwyn Rhif 1) 2005 (S.I. 2005 Rhif 71 (Cy.9) (C.3))
- The Occupational Pension Schemes (Winding Up, Deficiency on Winding Up and Transfer Values) (Amendment) Regulations 2005 (S.I. 2005 No. 72)
- The A1 Trunk Road (Northumberland and Tyne and Wear, Various Locations and Detrunking) Order 2005 (S.I. 2005 No. 73)
- The Merchant Shipping (Prevention of Pollution) (Drilling Rigs and Other Platforms) Order 2005 (S.I. 2005 No. 74)
- The Transport Act 2000 (Commencement of Quality Contracts Schemes) (England) Order 2005 (S.I. 2005 No. 75)
- The A30 Trunk Road (Bodmin to Indian Queens Improvement and Slip Roads) Order 2005 (S.I. 2005 No. 76)
- The A30 Trunk Road (Bodmin to Indian Queens Improvement and Slip Roads) (Detrunking) Order 2005 (S.I. 2005 No. 77)
- The Licensing Act 2003 (Hearings) (Amendment) Regulations 2005 (S.I. 2005 No. 78)
- The Licensing Act 2003 (Fees) Regulations 2005 (S.I. 2005 No. 79)
- The Licensing Act 2003 (Transitional conversions fees) Order 2005 (S.I. 2005 No. 80)
- The Road Traffic (Permitted Parking Area and Special Parking Area) (Metropolitan Borough of Stockport) Order 2005 (S.I. 2005 No. 81)
- The Stamp Duty Land Tax (Consequential Amendment of Enactments) Regulations 2005 (S.I. 2005 No. 82)
- The Finance Act 2003, Section 66 (Prescribed Persons) Order 2005 (S.I. 2005 No. 83)
- The Town and Country Planning (Use Classes) (Amendment) (England) Order 2005 (S.I. 2005 No. 84)
- The Town and Country Planning (General Permitted Development) (Amendment) (England) Order 2005 (S.I. 2005 No. 85)
- The Rail Vehicle Accessibility (Heathrow Express Class 360/2) Exemption Order 2005 (S.I. 2005 No. 86)
- The Housing (Right to Buy) (Priority of Charges) (England) Order 2005 (S.I. 2005 No. 92)
- The Tax Credits (Approval of Child Care Providers) Scheme 2005 (S.I. 2005 No. 93)
- The Tynemouth College and North Tyneside College (Dissolution) Order 2005 (S.I. 2005 No. 94)
- The Road Traffic (Permitted Parking Area and Special Parking Area) (Metropolitan District of Leeds) Order 2005 (S.I. 2005 No. 95)

== 101–200 ==
- Armed Forces (Pensions and Compensation) Act 2004 (Commencement No 1) Order 2005 (S.I. 2005 No. 116 (C.4))
- The Fees for Assessment of Active Substances (Third Stage Review) Regulations 2005 (S.I. 2005 No. 117)
- The Day Care (Application to Schools) (Wales) Regulations 2005 (S.I. 2005 No. 118 (W.10))
- Rheoliadau Gofal Dydd (Eu Cymhwyso i Ysgolion) (Cymru) 2005 (S.I. 2005 Rhif 118 (Cy.10))
- The Merseytram (Liverpool City Centre to Kirkby) Order 2005 (S.I. 2005 No. 120)
- The Health Protection Agency Act 2004 (Commencement) Order 2005 (S.I. 2005 No. 121 (C.5))
- The Finance Act 2004, Section 141 (Appointed Day) Order 2005 (S.I. 2005 No. 123 (C. 6))
- The Reservoirs (Panels of Civil Engineers) (Application and Fees) (Amendment) Regulations 2005 (S.I. 2005 No. 143)
- Registration of Political Parties (Prohibited Words and Expressions) (Amendment) Order 2005 (S.I. 2005 No. 147)
- The Unsolicited Goods and Services Act 1971 (Electronic Commerce) (Amendment) Regulations 2005 (S.I. 2005 No. 148)
- The Representation of the People (Variation of Limits of Candidates' Election Expenses) (City of London) Order 2005 (S.I. 2005 No. 153)
- The Hill Farm Allowance Regulations 2005 (S.I. 2005 No. 154)
- The Registration of Marriages (Amendment) Regulations 2005 (S.I. 2005 No. 155)
- The Local Authorities' Plans and Strategies (Disapplication) (England) Order 2005 (S.I. 2005 No. 157)
- The Social Security (Contributions) (Amendment) Regulations 2005 (S.I. 2005 No. 166)
- The County of Cambridgeshire (Electoral Changes) Order 2005 (S.I. 2005 No. 167)
- The County of Cornwall (Electoral Changes) Order 2005 (S.I. 2005 No. 168)
- The County of Buckinghamshire (Electoral Changes) Order 2005 (S.I. 2005 No. 169)
- The County of Lancashire (Electoral Changes) Order 2005 (S.I. 2005 No. 170)
- The County of Leicestershire (Electoral Changes) Order 2005 (S.I. 2005 No. 171)
- The County of North Yorkshire (Electoral Changes) Order 2005 (S.I. 2005 No. 172)
- The County of Norfolk (Electoral Changes) Order 2005 (S.I. 2005 No. 173)
- The County of Worcestershire (Electoral Changes) Order 2005 (S.I. 2005 No. 174)
- The County of West Sussex (Electoral Changes) Order 2005 (S.I. 2005 No. 175)
- The County of Durham (Electoral Changes) Order 2005 (S.I. 2005 No. 176)
- The Leasehold Houses (Notice of Insurance Cover) (England) (Amendment) Regulations 2005 (S.I. 2005 No. 177)
- The Police (Promotion) (Amendment) Regulations 2005 (S.I. 2005 No. 178)
- The Hammersmith Hospitals National Health Service Trust (Establishment) Amendment Order 2005 (S.I. 2005 No. 179)
- The Council Tax (Alteration of Lists and Appeals) (Amendment) (Wales) Regulations 2005 (S.I. 2005 No. 181 (W.14))
- Rheoliadau'r Dreth Gyngor (Newid Rhestrau ac Apelau) (Diwygio) (Cymru) 2005 (S.I. 2005 Rhif 181 (Cy.14))
- The Plastic Materials and Articles in Contact with Food (Amendment) (Wales) Regulations 2005 (S.I. 2005 No. 182 (W.15))
- Rheoliadau Deunyddiau ac Eitemau Plastig mewn Cysylltiad â Bwyd (Diwygio) (Cymru) 2005 (S.I. 2005 Rhif 182 (Cy.15))
- The Community Legal Service (Funding) (Counsel in Family Proceedings) (Amendment) Order 2005 (S.I. 2005 No. 184)
- The Controlled Foreign Companies (Excluded Countries) (Amendment) Regulations 2005 (S.I. 2005 No. 185)
- The Controlled Foreign Companies (Excluded Countries) (Amendment No. 2) Regulations 2005 (S.I. 2005 No. 186)
- The Transfrontier Shipment of Waste (Amendment) Regulations 2005 (S.I. 2005 No. 187)
- The Local Authorities (Alteration of Requisite Calculations) (England) Regulations 2005 (S.I. 2005 No. 190)
- The Child Trust Funds (Non-tax Appeals) Regulations 2005 (S.I. 2005 No. 191)
- The Commonhold and Leasehold Reform Act 2002 (Commencement No.5 and Saving and Transitional Provision) (Amendment) (England) Order 2005 (S.I. 2005 No. 193 (C. 7))
- The Road Traffic (Permitted Parking Area and Special Parking Area) (City of Sheffield) Order 2005 (S.I. 2005 No. 194)

== 201–300 ==
- The Planning and Compulsory Purchase Act 2004 (Commencement No.4 and Savings) Order 2005 (S.I. 2005 No. 204 (C.8))
- The Town and Country Planning (Timetable for Decisions) (England) Order 2005 (S.I. 2005 No. 205)
- Town and Country Planning (Temporary Stop Notice)(England) Regulations 2005 (S.I. 2005 No. 206)
- The Social Security and Child Support Commissioners (Procedure) (Amendment) Regulations 2005 (S.I. 2005 No. 207)
- The Food (Pistachios from Iran) (Emergency Control) (England) (Amendment) Regulations 2005 (S.I. 2005 No. 208)
- The Poultry Meat, Farmed Game Bird Meat and Rabbit Meat (Hygiene and Inspection) (Amendment) (England) Regulations 2005 (S.I. 2005 No. 209)
- The Sexual Offences Act 2003 (Prescribed Police Stations) Regulations 2005 (S.I. 2005 No. 210)
- The A66 Trunk Road (Long Newton Grade Separated Junction Slip Roads) Order 2005 (S.I. 2005 No. 211)
- The Local Authorities (Contracting Out of BID Levy Billing, Collection and Enforcement Functions) Order 2005 (S.I. 2005 No. 215)
- The Social Security Revaluation of Earnings Factors Order 2005 (S.I. 2005 No. 216)
- The Social Security Pensions (Low Earnings Threshold) Order 2005 (S.I. 2005 No. 217)
- The Common Agricultural Policy Single Payment and Support Schemes (Integrated Administration and Control System) Regulations 2005 (S.I. 2005 No. 218)
- The Common Agricultural Policy Single Payment and Support Schemes Regulations 2005 (S.I. 2005 No. 219)
- The Foreign Satellite Service Proscription Order 2005 (S.I. 2005 No. 220)
- The Greater London Authority (Allocation of Grants for Precept Calculations) Regulations 2005 (S.I. 2005 No. 221)
- The Copyright (Certification of Licensing Scheme for Educational Recording of Broadcasts) (Educational Recording Agency Limited) Order 2005 (S.I. 2005 No. 222)
- The Copyright (Educational Establishments) Order 2005 (S.I. 2005 No. 223)
- The Private Security Industry Act 2001 (Amendments to Schedule 2) Order 2005 (S.I. 2005 No. 224)
- The Asylum and Immigration Tribunal (Judicial Titles) Order 2005 (S.I. 2005 No. 227)
- The Anthrax Prevention Order 1971 etc. (Revocation) Regulations 2005 (S.I. 2005 No. 228)
- The Family Proceedings Courts (Children Act 1989) (Amendment) Rules 2005 (S.I. 2005 No. 229)
- The Asylum and Immigration Tribunal (Procedure) Rules 2005 (S.I. 2005 No. 230 (L.1))
- The Horse Passports (Wales) Regulations 2005 (S.I. 2005 No. 231 (W.21))
- Rheoliadau Pasbortau Ceffylau (Cymru) 2005 (S.I. 2005 Rhif 231 (Cy.21))
- The Export Control (Iraq and Ivory Coast) Order 2005 (S.I. 2005 No. 232)
- The Road Traffic (Permitted Parking Area and Special Parking Area) (County of Hampshire) (Borough of Havant) Order 2005 (S.I. 2005 No. 233)
- The Private Security Industry Act 2001 (Designated Activities) Order 2005 (S.I. 2005 No. 234)
- The Private Security Industry Act 2001 (Duration of Licence) Order 2005 (S.I. 2005 No. 235)
- The Rent Officers (Housing Benefit Functions) (Local Housing Allowance) Amendment Order 2005 (S.I. 2005 No. 236)
- The Private Security Industry (Licences) (Amendment) Regulations 2005 (S.I. 2005 No. 237)
- The Housing Benefit (General) (Local Housing Allowance) Amendment Regulations 2005 (S.I. 2005 No. 238)
- The A120 Trunk Road (Stansted to Marks Tey) Order 2005 (S.I. 2005 No. 239)
- The Institute of Trade Mark Attorneys Order 2005 (S.I. 2005 No. 240)
- The Education (Inspectors of Schools in England) Order 2005 (S.I. 2005 No. 241)
- The Ivory Coast (Restrictive Measures) (Overseas Territories) Order 2005 (S.I. 2005 No. 242)
- The Private Security Industry Act 2001 (Commencement No. 8) Order 2005 (S.I. 2005 No. 243 (C.9))
- The Child Abduction and Custody (Falkland Islands) (Amendment) Order 2005 (S.I. 2005 No. 244)
- The Pensions Appeal Tribunals (Posthumous Appeals) (Amendment) Order 2005 (S.I. 2005 No. 245)
- The Commonwealth Countries and Ireland (Immunities and Privileges) (Amendment) Order 2005 (S.I. 2005 No. 246)
- The European Convention on Cinematographic Co-production (Amendment) Order 2005 (S.I. 2005 No. 247)
- The Private Security Industry Act 2001 (Repeal and Revocation) Order 2005 (S.I. 2005 No. 248)
- The Parliamentary Commissioner Order 2005 (S.I. 2005 No. 249)
- The Parliamentary Constituencies (Scotland) Order 2005 (S.I. 2005 No. 250 (S. 1))
- The Health Service Commissioner for England (Special Health Authorities) Order 2005 (S.I. 2005 No. 251)
- The Transfer of Functions (Children, Young People and Families) Order 2005 (S.I. 2005 No. 252)
- The Ivory Coast (United Nations Sanctions) Order 2005 (S.I. 2005 No. 253)
- The Trial of the Pyx (Amendment) Order 2005 (S.I. 2005 No. 254)
- The Pensions (Northern Ireland) Order 2005 (S.I. 2005 No. 255 (N.I. 1))
- The Non-Domestic Rating (Demand Notices) (Wales) (Amendment) Regulations 2005 (S.I. 2005 No. 256 (W.22))
- Rheoliadau Ardrethu Annomestig (Hysbysiadau Galw am Dalu) (Cymru) (Diwygio) 2005 (S.I. 2005 Rhif 256 (Cy.22))
- The Food (Pistachios from Iran) (Emergency Control) (Wales) (No.2) (Amendment) Regulations 2005 (S.I. 2005 No. 257 (W.23))
- Rheoliadau Bwyd (Cnau Pistasio o Iran) (Rheolaeth Frys) (Cymru) (Rhif 2) (Diwygio) 2005 (S.I. 2005 Rhif 257 (Cy.23))
- The National Health Service (Performers Lists) (Wales) (Amendment) Regulations 2005 (S.I. 2005 No. 258 (W.24))
- Rheoliadau'r Gwasanaeth Iechyd Gwladol (Rhestri Cyflawnwyr) (Cymru) (Diwygio) 2005 (S.I. 2005 Rhif 258 (Cy.24))
- The Miscellaneous Food Additives (Amendment) (Wales) Regulations 2005 (S.I. 2005 No. 259 (W.25))
- Rheoliadau Ychwanegion Bwyd Amrywiol (Diwygio) (Cymru) 2005 (S.I. 2005 Rhif 259 (Cy.25))
- The End-of-Life Vehicles (Producer Responsibility) Regulations 2005 (S.I. 2005 No. 263)
- The Family Proceedings (Amendment) Rules 2005 (S.I. 2005 No. 264)
- The European Communities (Jurisdiction and Judgments in Matrimonial and Parental Responsibility Matters) Regulations 2005 (S.I. 2005 No. 265)
- The Non-Contentious Probate Fees (Indian Ocean Tsunami) Order 2005 (S.I. 2005 No. 266 (L. 2))
- The Disqualification from Working with Children (Scotland) Order 2005 (S.I. 2005 No. 267)
- The Water and Sewerage Undertakers (Inset Appointments) Regulations 2005 (S.I. 2005 No. 268)
- The Representation of the People (Variation of Limits of Candidates' Election Expenses) Order 2005 (S.I. 2005 No. 269)
- The Financial Services and Markets Act 2000 (Financial Promotion and Promotion of Collective Investment Schemes) (Miscellaneous Amendments) Order 2005 (S.I. 2005 No. 270)
- The Misuse of Drugs (Amendment) Regulations 2005 (S.I. 2005 No. 271)
- The Financial Services and Markets Act 2000 (Disclosure of Information by Prescribed Persons) (Amendment) Regulations 2005 (S.I. 2005 No. 272)
- The Housing Benefit and Council Tax Benefit (Miscellaneous Amendments) Regulations 2005 (S.I. 2005 No. 273)
- The Financial Services and Markets Act 2000 (Service of Notices) (Amendment) Regulations 2005 (S.I. 2005 No. 274)
- The Pensions Act 2004 (Commencement No. 2, Transitional Provisions and Consequential Amendments) Order 2005 (S.I. 2005 No. 275 (C.10))
- The Capital Gains Tax (Gilt-edged Securities) Order 2005 (S.I. 2005 No. 276)
- The Pension Protection Fund (Partially Guaranteed Schemes) (Modification) Regulations 2005 (S.I. 2005 No. 277)
- The Potatoes Originating in the Netherlands (Revocation) (England) Regulations 2005 (S.I. 2005 No. 278)
- The Dutch Potatoes (Notification) (England) Order 2005 (S.I. 2005 No. 279)
- The Gas Act 1986 (Exemption) (No. 2) Order 2005 (S.I. 2005 No. 280)
- The Electromagnetic Compatibility Regulations 2005 (S.I. 2005 No. 281)
- The Political Parties, Elections and Referendums Act 2000 (Disapplication of Part IV for Northern Ireland Parties, etc.) Order 2005 (S.I. 2005 No. 299)

== 301–400 ==
- The Social Security (Industrial Injuries) (Prescribed Diseases) Amendment Regulations 2005 (S.I. 2005 No. 324)
- The Plastic Materials and Articles in Contact with Food (Amendment) (England) Regulations 2005 (S.I. 2005 No. 325)
- The Housing Act 2004 (Commencement No. 1) (England) Order 2005 (S.I. 2005 No. 326 (C.11))
- The Rail Vehicle Accessibility (Virgin West Coast Class 390) Exemption Order 2005 (S.I. 2005 No. 329)
- The Asylum (Designated States) Order 2005 (S.I. 2005 No. 330)
- The Kings Lynn and Wisbech Hospitals National Health Service Trust (Change of Name) (Establishment) Amendment Order 2005 (S.I. 2005 No. 332)
- The Legal Officers (Annual Fees) Order 2005 (S.I. 2005 No. 336)
- The Social Security, Child Support and Tax Credits (Miscellaneous Amendments) Regulations 2005 (S.I. 2005 No. 337)
- The Pension Protection Fund (Limit on Borrowing) Order 2005 (S.I. 2005 No. 339)
- The General Commissioners (Jurisdiction and Procedure) (Amendment) Regulations 2005 (S.I. 2005 No. 340)
- The Special Commissioners (Jurisdiction and Procedure) (Amendment) Regulations 2005 (S.I. 2005 No. 341)
- The Child Benefit and Guardian's Allowance (Miscellaneous Amendments) Regulations 2005 (S.I. 2005 No. 343)
- The Water Act 2003 (Commencement No. 3) (England) Order 2005 (S.I. 2005 No. 344 (C.12))
- The Education (Budget Statements) (England) Regulations 2005 (S.I. 2005 No. 345)
- The Education (Information as to Provision of Education) (England)(Amendment) Regulations 2005 (S.I. 2005 No. 346)
- The Police Act 1997 (Criminal Records) (Amendment) Regulations 2005 (S.I. 2005 No. 347)
- The Immigration Services Commissioner (Designated Professional Body) (Fees) Order 2005 (S.I. 2005 No. 348)
- The Terrorism Act 2000 (Continuance of Part VII) Order 2005 (S.I. 2005 No. 350)
- The Public Trustee (Fees) (Amendment) Order 2005 (S.I. 2005 No. 351)
- The Civil Procedure (Amendment) Rules 2005 (S.I. 2005 No. 352 (L. 3))
- The Wireless Telegraphy (Automotive Short Range Radar) (Exemption) Regulations 2005 (S.I. 2005 No. 353)
- The Airport Byelaws (Designation) Order 2005 (S.I. 2005 No. 354)
- The Restriction on Agreements (Manufacturers and Importers of Motor Cars) (Revocation) Order 2005 (S.I. 2005 No. 355)
- The Armed Forces (Pensions and Compensation) Act 2004 (Commencement No. 2) Order 2005 (S.I. 2005 No. 356 (C.13))
- The Licensing Act 2003 (Fees) (Amendment) Regulations 2005 (S.I. 2005 No. 357)
- The Statutory Maternity Pay (General) and the Statutory Paternity Pay and Statutory Adoption Pay (General) (Amendment) Regulations 2005 (S.I. 2005 No. 358)
- The Salmonella in Laying Flocks (Survey Powers) (England) Regulations 2005 (S.I. 2005 No. 359)
- The Common Agricultural Policy Single Payment and Support Schemes (Wales) Regulations 2005 (S.I. 2005 No. 360 (W.29))
- The Private Security Industry Act 2001 (Designated Activities) (Revocation) Order 2005 (S.I. 2005 No. 361)
- The Private Security Industry Act 2001 (Commencement No. 8) (Amendment) Order 2005 (S.I. 2005 No. 362 (C. 14))
- The Food Safety (General Food Hygiene) (Amendment) (Wales) Regulations 2005 (S.I. 2005 No. 363 (W.30))
- Rheoliadau Diogelwch Bwyd (Hylendid Bwyd yn Gyffredinol) (Diwygio) (Cymru) 2005 (S.I. 2005 Rhif 363 (Cy.30))
- The Contaminants in Food (Wales) Regulations 2005 (S.I. 2005 No. 364 (W.31))
- Rheoliadau Halogion mewn Bwyd (Cymru) 2005 (S.I. 2005 Rhif 364 (Cy.31))
- The Extradition Act 2003 (Amendment to Designations) Order 2005 (S.I. 2005 No. 365)
- The National Health Service (General Medical Services Contracts) (Prescription of Drugs Etc.) (Wales) (Amendment) Regulations 2005 (S.I. 2005 No. 366 (W.32))
- Rheoliadau'r Gwasanaeth Iechyd Gwladol (Contractau Gwasanaethau Meddygol Cyffredinol) (Rhagnodi Cyffuriau Etc.) (Cymru) (Diwygio) 2005 (S.I. 2005 Rhif 366 (Cy.32))
- The Town and Country Planning (Blight Provisions) (Wales) Order 2005 (S.I. 2005 No. 367 (W.33))
- Gorchymyn Cynllunio Gwlad a Thref (Darpariaethau Malltod) (Cymru) 2005 (S.I. 2005 Rhif 367 (Cy.33))
- The Accounts and Audit (Wales) Regulations 2005 (S.I. 2005 No. 368 (W.34))
- Rheoliadau Cyfrifon ac Archwilio (Cymru) 2005 (S.I. 2005 Rhif 368 (Cy.34))
- The Income-related Benefits (Subsidy to Authorities) Amendment Order 2005 (S.I. 2005 No. 369)
- The Road Traffic (Permitted Parking Area and Special Parking Area) (Borough of Thurrock) Order 2005 (S.I. 2005 No. 370)
- The Town and Country Planning (Costs of Inquiries etc.) (Standard Daily Amount) (Wales) Regulations 2005 (S.I. 2005 No. 371 (W.35))
- Rheoliadau Cynllunio Gwlad a Thref (Costau Ymchwiliadau etc.) (Swm Dyddiol Safonol) (Cymru) 2005 (S.I. 2005 Rhif 371 (Cy.35))
- The Asylum and Immigration (Treatment of Claimants, etc.) Act 2004 (Commencement No.4) Order 2005 (S.I. 2005 No. 372 (C. 15))
- The Criminal Justice Act 2003 (Commencement No.7) Order 2005 (S.I. 2005 No. 373 (C.16))
- The Awards for All (England) Joint Scheme (Authorisation) Order 2005 (S.I. 2005 No. 374)
- The Care Standards Act 2000 (Commencement No. 21) Order 2005 (S.I. 2005 No. 375 (W.36) (C.17))
- Gorchymyn Deddf Safonau Gofal 2000 (Cychwyn Rhif 21) 2005 (S.I. 2005 Rhif 375 (Cy.36) (C.17))
- The Road Traffic (Permitted Parking Area and Special Parking Area) (City of Coventry) Order 2005 (S.I. 2005 No. 378)
- The Diseases of Animals (Fees for the Testing of Disinfectants) (England) Order 2005 (S.I. 2005 No. 379)
- The Financial Services and Markets Act 2000 (Market Abuse) Regulations 2005 (S.I. 2005 No. 381)
- The Investment Recommendation (Media) Regulations 2005 (S.I. 2005 No. 382)
- The Child Trust Funds (Amendment) Regulations 2005 (S.I. 2005 No. 383)
- The Criminal Procedure Rules 2005 (S.I. 2005 No. 384 (L.4))
- The Proceeds of Crime Act 2002 (References to Financial Investigators) (Amendment) Order 2005 (S.I. 2005 No. 386)
- The Road Traffic (Permitted Parking Area and Special Parking Area) (Borough of Torbay) Order 2005 (S.I. 2005 No. 387)
- The Road Traffic (Permitted Parking Area and Special Parking Area) (County of Surrey) (Borough of Epsom and Ewell) Order 2005 (S.I. 2005 No. 388)
- The Adoption Agencies Regulations 2005 (S.I. 2005 No. 389)
- The Tractor etc. (EC Type-Approval) Regulations 2005 (S.I. 2005 No. 390)
- The Electricity (Fuel Mix Disclosure) Regulations 2005 (S.I. 2005 No. 391)
- The Adoptions with a Foreign Element Regulations 2005 (S.I. 2005 No. 392)
- The Sea Fishing (Restriction on Days at Sea) Order 2005 (S.I. 2005 No. 393)
- The Children Act 2004 (Commencement No. 1) Order 2005 (S.I. 2005 No. 394 (C.18))
- The Rail Vehicle Accessibility (Croydon Tramlink Class CR4000 Vehicles) Exemption (Amendment) Order 2005 (S.I. 2005 No. 395)
- The Central Sussex College (Incorporation) Order 2005 (S.I. 2005 No. 396)
- The Central Sussex College (Government) Regulations 2005 (S.I. 2005 No. 397)
- The Cambridge University Hospitals National Health Service Foundation Trust (Transfer of Trust Property) Order 2005 (S.I. 2005 No. 398)
- The General Medical Council (Registration (Fees) (Amendment) Regulations) Order of Council 2005 (S.I. 2005 No. 399)
- The General Medical Council (Registration Appeals Panels Procedure) Rules Order of Council 2005 (S.I. 2005 No. 400)

== 401–500 ==
- The General Medical Council (Fraud or Error in relation to Registration) Rules Order of Council 2005 (S.I. 2005 No. 401)
- The General Medical Council (Constitution of Panels and Investigation Committee) (Amendment) Rules Order of Council 2005 (S.I. 2005 No. 402)
- The Road Traffic (Permitted Parking Area and Special Parking Area) (County of Surrey) (Borough of Spelthorne) Order 2005 (S.I. 2005 No. 403)
- The Production of Bovine Collagen Intended for Human Consumption in the United Kingdom (England) Regulations 2005 (S.I. 2005 No. 404)
- The Road Traffic (Permitted Parking Area and Special Parking Area) (County of Hertfordshire) (Borough of Broxbourne) Order 2005 (S.I. 2005 No. 405)
- The Town and Country Planning (Blight Provisions) (England) Order 2005 (S.I. 2005 No. 406)
- The Housing (Right to Buy) (Priority of Charges) (England) (No.2) Order 2005 (S.I. 2005 No. 407)
- The Health Protection Agency Regulations 2005 (S.I. 2005 No. 408)
- The Finance Act 1993, Section 86(2), (Single Payment Scheme) Order 2005 (S.I. 2005 No. 409)
- The Housing (Right to Buy) (Prescribed Forms) (Amendment) (England) Regulations 2005 (S.I. 2005 No. 410)
- The Castle Vale Housing Action Trust (Dissolution) Order 2005 (S.I. 2005 No. 411)
- The Family Proceedings (Amendment No. 2) Rules 2005 (S.I. 2005 No. 412 (L. 5))
- The Family Proceedings Courts (Children Act 1989) (Amendment No. 2) Rules 2005 (S.I. 2005 No. 413 (L.6))
- The Pneumoconiosis etc. (Workers' Compensation) (Payment of Claims) (Amendment) Regulations 2005 (S.I. 2005 No. 414)
- The Environmental Protection (Waste Recycling Payments) (England) (Amendment) Regulations 2005 (S.I. 2005 No. 415)
- The Council Tax (Prescribed Classes of Dwellings) (Amendment) (England) Regulations 2005 (S.I. 2005 No. 416)
- The Northern Ireland Arms Decommissioning Act 1997 (Amnesty Period) Order 2005 (S.I. 2005 No. 418)
- The Local Authorities (Discretionary Expenditure Limits) (England) Order 2005 (S.I. 2005 No. 419)
- The Coroners (Amendment) Rules 2005 (S.I. 2005 No. 420)
- The New Forest National Park Authority (Establishment) Order 2005 (S.I. 2005 No. 421)
- The Central Rating List (Wales) Regulations 2005 (S.I. 2005 No. 422 (W.40))
- The Countryside and Rights of Way Act 2000 (Commencement No. 6) (Wales) Order 2005 (S.I. 2005 No. 423 (W.41) (C.19))
- Gorchymyn Deddf Cefn Gwlad a Hawliau Tramwy 2000 (Cychwyn Rhif 6) (Cymru) 2005 (S.I. 2005 Rhif 423 (Cy.41) (C.19))
- The Health and Social Care (Community Health and Standards) Act 2003 (Healthcare Inspections) (Wales) Regulations 2005 (S.I. 2005 No. 424 (W.42))
- Rheoliadau Deddf Iechyd a Gofal Cymdeithasol (Iechyd Cymunedol a Safonau) 2003 (Arolygiadau Gofal Iechyd) (Cymru) 2005 (S.I. 2005 Rhif 424 (Cy.42))
- The Crime (International Co-operation) Act 2003 (Exercise of Functions) Order 2005 (S.I. 2005 No. 425)
- The Smoke Control Areas (Exempted Fireplaces) (Wales) Order 2005 (S.I. 2005 No. 426 (W.43))
- Gorchymyn Ardaloedd Rheoli Mwg (Lleoedd Tân Esempt) (Cymru) 2005 (S.I. 2005 Rhif 426 (Cy.43))
- The National Health Service (Charges for Drugs and Appliances) (Wales) (Amendment) Regulations 2005 (S.I. 2005 No. 427 (W.44))
- Rheoliadau'r Gwasanaeth Iechyd Gwladol (Ffioedd am Gyffuriau a Chyfarpar) (Cymru) (Diwygio) 2005 (S.I. 2005 Rhif 427 (Cy.44))
- The Isle of Axholme Internal Drainage Board Order 2005 (S.I. 2005 No. 428)
- The Broads and Norfolk Rivers Internal Drainage Boards Order 2005 (S.I. 2005 No. 429)
- The Lower Severn Internal Drainage Board Order 2005 (S.I. 2005 No. 430)
- The Parrett Internal Drainage Board Order 2005 (S.I. 2005 No. 431)
- The Pesticides (Maximum Residue Levels in Crops, Food and Feeding Stuffs) (England and Wales) (Amendment) Regulations 2005 (S.I. 2005 No. 432)
- The Children and Family Court Advisory and Support Service (Membership, Committee and Procedure) Regulations 2005 (S.I. 2005 No. 433)
- The Education Development Plans (Wales) (Amendment) Regulations 2005 (S.I. 2005 No. 434 (W.45))
- Rheoliadau Cynlluniau Datblygu Addysg (Cymru) (Diwygio 2005 (S.I. 2005 Rhif 434 (Cy.45))
- The Employment Tribunals (Constitution and Rules of Procedure) (Amendment) Regulations 2005 (S.I. 2005 No. 435)
- The University Hospital of North Staffordshire National Health Service Trust (Transfer of Trust Property) Order 2005 (S.I. 2005 No. 436)
- The Armed Forces Early Departure Payments Scheme Order 2005 (S.I. 2005 No. 437)
- The Armed Forces Pension Scheme Order 2005 (S.I. 2005 No. 438)
- The Armed Forces and Reserve Forces (Compensation Scheme) Order 2005 (S.I. 2005 No. 439)
- The Community Trade Mark (Designation of Community Trade Mark Courts) Regulations 2005 (S.I. 2005 No. 440)
- The Pension Protection Fund (Multi-employer Schemes) (Modification) Regulations 2005 (S.I. 2005 No. 441)
- The Energy Act 2004 (Commencement No. 4) Order 2005 (S.I. 2005 No. 442 (C.20))
- The Trade in Goods (Control) (Amendment) Order 2005 (S.I. 2005 No. 443)
- The Surrey Hampshire Borders National Health Service Trust (Transfer of Trust Property) Order 2005 (S.I. 2005 No. 444)
- The Trade in Controlled Goods (Embargoed Destinations) (Amendment) Order 2005 (S.I. 2005 No. 445)
- The Courts-Martial Appeal (Amendment) Rules 2005 (S.I. 2005 No. 446 (L. 7))
- The Gangmasters (Licensing) Act 2004 (Commencement No. 2) Order 2005 (S.I. 2005 No. 447 (C. 21))
- The Gangmasters (Licensing Authority) Regulations 2005 (S.I. 2005 No. 448)
- The Pension Protection Fund (Hybrid Schemes) (Modification) Regulations 2005 (S.I. 2005 No. 449)
- The Information Tribunal (Enforcement Appeals) (Amendment) Rules 2005 (S.I. 2005 No. 450)
- The West Hertfordshire Hospitals National Health Service Trust (Transfer of Trust Property) Order 2005 (S.I. 2005 No. 451)
- The Road Traffic (Permitted Parking Area and Special Parking Area) (County of Hertfordshire) (Borough of Stevenage) Order 2005 (S.I. 2005 No. 452)
- The Social Security (Deferral of Retirement Pensions) Regulations 2005 (S.I. 2005 No. 453)
- The Social Security (Graduated Retirement Benefit) Regulations 2005 (S.I. 2005 No. 454)
- The Social Security (Claims and Payments) Amendment Regulations 2005 (S.I. 2005 No. 455)
- The Sunderland Teaching Primary Care Trust (Transfer of Trust Property) Order 2005 (S.I. 2005 No. 456)
- The Health and Social Care (Community Health and Standards) Act 2003 (Commencement) (No. 6) Order 2005 (S.I. 2005 No. 457 (C.22 ))
- The Smoke Flavourings (England) Regulations 2005 (S.I. 2005 No. 464)
- The Dairy Produce Quotas Regulations 2005 (S.I. 2005 No. 465)
- The Dairy Produce Quotas (General Provisions) (Amendment) Regulations 2005 (S.I. 2005 No. 466)
- The Data Protection (Subject Access Modification) (Social Work) (Amendment) Order 2005 (S.I. 2005 No. 467)
- The Export of Goods, Transfer of Technology and Provision of Technical Assistance (Control) (Amendment) Order 2005 (S.I. 2005 No. 468)
- The Social Security (Retirement Pensions etc.) (Transitional Provisions) Regulations 2005 (S.I. 2005 No. 469)
- The Police Authorities (Best Value) Performance Indicators Order 2005 (S.I. 2005 No. 470)
- The Public Record Office (Fees) Regulations 2005 (S.I. 2005 No. 471)
- The Family Proceedings Fees (Amendment) Order 2005 (S.I. 2005 No. 472 (L.8))
- The Civil Proceedings Fees (Amendment) Order 2005 (S.I. 2005 No. 473 (L.9))
- The Damages (Government and Health Service Bodies) Order 2005 (S.I. 2005 No. 474)
- The Road Traffic (NHS Charges) Amendment Regulations 2005 (S.I. 2005 No. 475)
- The Traffic Management (Strategic Roads in Greater London) Designation Order 2005 (S.I. 2005 No. 476)
- The Water Industry (Determination of Turnover for Penalties) Order 2005 (S.I. 2005 No. 477)
- The Surrey and Borders Partnership National Health Service Trust (Establishment) and the North West Surrey Mental Health National Health Service Partnership Trust, the Surrey Hampshire Borders National Health Service Trust and the Surrey Oaklands National Health Service Trust (Dissolution) Order 2005 (S.I. 2005 No. 478)
- The Bedfordshire and Luton Community National Health Service Trust (Change of Name) (Establishment) Amendment Order 2005 (S.I. 2005 No. 479)
- The National Health Service (General Ophthalmic Services Supplementary List) and (General Ophthalmic Services Amendment and Consequential Amendment) Regulations 2005 (S.I. 2005 No. 480)
- The Day Care and Child Minding (Inspections) (Prescribed Matters) (England) (Amendment) Regulations 2005 (S.I. 2005 No. 482)
- The National Health Service (Optical Charges and Payments) and (General Ophthalmic Services) Amendment Regulations 2005 (S.I. 2005 No. 483)
- The Fines Collection (Amendment) Regulations 2005 (S.I. 2005 No. 484)
- The Register of Fines (Amendment) Regulations 2005 (S.I. 2005 No. 485)
- The Whole of Government Accounts (Designation of Bodies) Order 2005 (S.I. 2005 No. 486)
- The Collection of Fines (Pilot Schemes) (Amendment) Order 2005 (S.I. 2005 No. 487)
- The Electricity (Class Exemptions from the Requirement for a Licence) (Amendment) Order 2005 (S.I. 2005 No. 488)
- The Legal Services Ombudsman (Jurisdiction) (Amendment) Order 2005 (S.I. 2005 No. 489)
- The Electricity Act 1989 (Uniform Prices in the North of Scotland) Order 2005 (S.I. 2005 No. 490)
- The Care Standards Act 2000 (Relevant Registers of Social Workers) Regulations 2005 (S.I. 2005 No. 491)
- The Immigration (Passenger Transit Visa) (Amendment) Order 2005 (S.I. 2005 No. 492)
- The National Institute for Clinical Excellence (Establishment and Constitution) Amendment Order 2005 (S.I. 2005 No. 497)
- The National Institute for Clinical Excellence (Amendment) Regulations 2005 (S.I. 2005 No. 498)
- The Health and Social Care Information Centre (Establishment and Constitution) Order 2005 (S.I. 2005 No. 499)
- The Health and Social Care Information Centre Regulations 2005 (S.I. 2005 No. 500)

== 501–600 ==
- The Special Health Authorities Abolition Order 2005 (S.I. 2005 No. 502)
- The National Health Service Litigation Authority (Establishment and Constitution) Amendment Order 2005 (S.I. 2005 No. 503)
- The National Patient Safety Agency (Establishment and Constitution) Amendment Order 2005 (S.I. 2005 No. 504)
- The Insolvency (Amendment) Regulations 2005 (S.I. 2005 No. 512)
- The General Medical Services and Personal Medical Services Transitional and Consequential Provisions (Amendment) Order 2005 (S.I. 2005 No. 518)
- The Colours in Food (Amendment) (England) Regulations 2005 (S.I. 2005 No. 519)
- The Children (Allocation of Proceedings) (Amendment) Order 2005 (S.I. 2005 No. 520)
- The Guaranteed Minimum Pensions Increase Order 2005 (S.I. 2005 No. 521)
- The Social Security Benefits Up-rating Order 2005 (S.I. 2005 No. 522)
- The Insolvency Practitioners and Insolvency Services Account (Fees) (Amendment) Order 2005 (S.I. 2005 No. 523)
- The Insolvency Practitioners Regulations 2005 (S.I. 2005 No. 524)
- The Health Protection Agency Act 2004 (National Radiological Protection Board and Health Protection Agency Special Health Authority (Yr Asiantaeth Diogelu Iechyd)) (Consequential Provisions) Order 2005 (S.I. 2005 No. 525)
- The LEA Budget, Schools Budget and Individual Schools Budget (Amendment) (England) Regulations 2005 (S.I. 2005 No. 526)
- The Insolvency (Amendment) Rules 2005 (S.I. 2005 No. 527)
- The Energy Act 2004 (Assistance for Areas with High Distribution Costs) Order 2005 (S.I. 2005 No. 528)
- The Income-related Benefits (Subsidy to Authorities) Amendment (No. 2) Order 2005 (S.I. 2005 No. 535)
- The Dairy Produce Quotas (Wales) Regulations 2005 (S.I. 2005 No. 537 (W.47))
- Rheoliadau Cwotâu Cynnyrch Llaeth (Cymru) 2005 (S.I. 2005 Rhif 537 (Cy.47))
- The Education (School Teachers' Pay and Conditions) Order 2005 (S.I. 2005 No. 539)
- The Insolvency Proceedings (Fees) (Amendment) Order 2005 (S.I. 2005 No. 544)
- The Justices' Clerks Rules 2005 (S.I. 2005 No. 545 (L.10))
- The Industrial Training Levy (Construction Board) Order 2005 (S.I. 2005 No. 546)
- The Courts Act 2003 (Commencement No. 9, Savings, Consequential and Transitional Provisions) Order 2005 (S.I. 2005 No. 547 (C.23))
- The Welsh Local Flood Defence Scheme 1996 (Revocation) Order 2005 (S.I. 2005 No. 548)
- The Non-Domestic Rating (Communications and Light Railways) (England) Regulations 2005 (S.I. 2005 No. 549)
- The Public Audit (Wales) Act 2004 (Transfer of Property, Rights and Liabilities of the Audit Commission for Local Authorities and the National Health Service in England and Wales) Order 2005 (S.I. 2005 No. 550)
- The Central Rating List (England) Regulations 2005 (S.I. 2005 No. 551)
- The Public Audit (Wales) Act 2004 (Transfer of Property, Rights and Liabilities of the Comptroller and Auditor General) Order 2005 (S.I. 2005 No. 552)
- The Justices of the Peace (Size and Chairmanship of Bench) Rules 2005 (S.I. 2005 No. 553)
- The Local Justice Areas Order 2005 (S.I. 2005 No. 554)
- The Contracting-out, Protected Rights and Safeguarded Rights (Transfer Payment) Amendment Regulations 2005 (S.I. 2005 No. 555)
- The TSE (England) (Amendment) Regulations 2005 (S.I. 2005 No. 556)
- The Feeding Stuffs (Establishments and Intermediaries) (Amendment) (England) Regulations 2005 (S.I. 2005 No. 557)
- The Public Audit (Wales) Act 2004 (Commencement No. 2 and Transitional Provisions and Savings) Order 2005 (S.I. 2005 No. 558 (W.48) (C.24))
- Gorchymyn Deddf Archwilio Cyhoeddus (Cymru) 2004 (Cychwyn Rhif 2 a Darpariaethau Trosiannol ac Arbedion) 2005 (S.I. 2005 Rhif 558 (Cy.48) (C.24))
- The Family Proceedings (Amendment No. 3) Rules 2005 (S.I. 2005 No. 559 (L. 11))
- The Asylum and Immigration Tribunal (Fast Track Procedure) Rules 2005 (S.I. 2005 No. 560 (L. 12))
- The Asylum and Immigration (Fast Track Time Limits) Order 2005 (S.I. 2005 No. 561 (L. 13))
- The Courts Act 2003 (Continuing Provision of Court-houses) Regulations 2005 (S.I. 2005 No. 562)
- The Discharge of Fines by Unpaid Work (Pilot Schemes) (Amendment) Order 2005 (S.I. 2005 No. 563)
- The Justices of the Peace (Training and Appraisal) Rules 2005 (S.I. 2005 No. 564)
- The Asylum and Immigration (Treatment of Claimants, etc.) Act 2004 (Commencement No. 5 and Transitional Provisions) Order 2005 (S.I. 2005 No. 565 (C.25))
- The Gaming Act 1968 (Variation of Fees) (England and Wales) Order 2005 (S.I. 2005 No. 566)
- The Gaming Act 1968 (Variation of Fees) Order 2005 (S.I. 2005 No. 567)
- The Lotteries (Gaming Board Fees) Order 2005 (S.I. 2005 No. 568)
- The Asylum and Immigration Tribunal (Procedure) (Amendment) Rules 2005 (S.I. 2005 No. 569 (L.14))
- The Gaming (Bingo) Act 1985 (Fees) (Amendment) Order 2005 (S.I. 2005 No. 570)
- The Community Legal Service (Funding) (Amendment) Order 2005 (S.I. 2005 No. 571)
- The Charities (Accounts and Reports) Regulations 2005 (S.I. 2005 No. 572)
- The Housing Benefit and Council Tax Benefit (Miscellaneous Amendments) (No 2) Regulations 2005 (S.I. 2005 No. 573)
- The Social Security (Miscellaneous Amendments) Regulations 2005 (S.I. 2005 No. 574)
- The Commission for Social Care Inspection (Fees and Frequency of Inspections) (Amendment) Regulations 2005 (S.I. 2005 No. 575)
- The National Health Service (Dental Charges) Amendment Regulations 2005 (S.I. 2005 No. 576)
- The Stakeholder Pension Schemes (Amendment) Regulations 2005 (S.I. 2005 No. 577)
- The National Health Service (Charges for Drugs and Appliances) and (Travel Expenses and Remission of Charges) Amendment Regulations 2005 (S.I. 2005 No. 578)
- The Domestic Violence, Crime and Victims Act 2004 (Commencement No. 1) Order 2005 (S.I. 2005 No. 579 (C.26))
- The Merchant Shipping (Fees) (Amendment) Regulations 2005 (S.I. 2005 No. 580)
- The Penalties for Disorderly Behaviour (Amount of Penalty) (Amendment) Order 2005 (S.I. 2005 No. 581)
- The Immigration (Application Fees) Order 2005 (S.I. 2005 No. 582)
- The Diseases of Animals (Approved Disinfectants) (Amendment) (Wales) Order 2005 (S.I. 2005 No. 583 (W.49))
- Gorchymyn Clefydau Anifeiliaid (Diheintyddion a Gymeradwywyd) (Diwygio) (Cymru) 2005 (S.I. 2005 Rhif 583 (Cy.49))
- The Police Authorities (Lay Justices Selection Panel) Regulations 2005 (S.I. 2005 No. 584)
- The Family Proceedings Courts (Children Act 1989) (Amendment No 3) Rules 2005 (S.I. 2005 No. 585)
- The Salmonella in Laying Flocks (Survey Powers) (Wales) Regulations 2005 (S.I. 2005 No. 586 (W.50))
- Rheoliadau Salmonela mewn Heidiau Dodwy (Pwerau Arolygu) (Cymru) 2005 (S.I. 2005 Rhif 586 (Cy.50))
- The High Court and County Courts Jurisdiction (Amendment) Order 2005 (S.I. 2005 No. 587 (L.15))
- The Court Security Officers (Designation) Regulations 2005 (S.I. 2005 No. 588)
- The Community Legal Service (Financial) (Amendment) Regulations 2005 (S.I. 2005 No. 589)
- The Pension Protection Fund (Entry Rules) Regulations 2005 (S.I. 2005 No. 590)
- The Civil Legal Aid (General)(Amendment) Regulations 2005 (S.I. 2005 No. 591)
- The Financial Services and Markets Act 2000 (Exemption) (Amendment) Order 2005 (S.I. 2005 No. 592)
- The Financial Services and Markets Act 2000 (Regulated Activities) (Amendment) Order 2005 (S.I. 2005 No. 593)
- The Financial Services and Markets Act 2000 (Stakeholder Products) (Amendment) Regulations 2005 (S.I. 2005 No. 594)
- The Asylum Support (Interim Provisions) (Amendment) Regulations 2005 (S.I. 2005 No. 595)
- The Criminal Justice and Court Services Act 2000 (Commencement No. 14) Order 2005 (S.I. 2005 No. 596 (C. 27 ))
- The Register of Occupational and Personal Pension Schemes Regulations 2005 (S.I. 2005 No. 597)
- The Local Government (Best Value) Performance Indicators and Performance Standards (England) Order 2005 (S.I. 2005 No. 598)
- The Pension Protection Fund (Eligible Schemes) Appointed Day Order 2005 (S.I. 2005 No. 599 (C.28))
- The Pension Protection Fund (Reviewable Matters) Regulations 2005 (S.I. 2005 No. 600)

== 601–700 ==
- The Borough of Stockton-on-Tees (Electoral Changes) (Amendment) Order 2005 (S.I. 2005 No. 601)
- The Police and Criminal Evidence Act 1984 (Codes of Practice) (Revisions to Code C) Order 2005 (S.I. 2005 No. 602)
- Community Health Councils (Amendment) Regulations 2005 (S.I. 2005 No. 603 (W.51))
- Rheoliadau Cynghorau Iechyd Cymuned (Diwygio) 2005 (S.I. 2005 Rhif 603 (Cy.51))
- The National Health Service Liabilities Schemes Amendment Regulations 2005 (S.I. 2005 No. 604)
- The Children and Family Court Advisory and Support Service (Reviewed Case Referral) (Amendment) Regulations 2005 (S.I. 2005 No. 605)
- The Communications (Television Licensing) (Amendment) Regulations 2005 (S.I. 2005 No. 606)
- The National Assembly for Wales (Conduct of Litigation and Exercise of Rights of Audience) Regulations 2005 (S.I. 2005 No. 607)
- The Transformational Grants Joint Scheme (Authorisation) Order 2005 (S.I. 2005 No. 608)
- The Individual Savings Account (Amendment) Regulations 2005 (S.I. 2005 No. 609)
- The Pension Protection Fund (Appointment of Ordinary Members) Regulations 2005 (S.I. 2005 No. 616)
- The Courts Act 2003 (Consequential Provisions) (No. 2) Order 2005 (S.I. 2005 No. 617)
- The Environmental Stewardship (England) Regulations 2005 (S.I. 2005 No. 621)
- The Occupational and Personal Pension Schemes (General Levy) Regulations 2005 (S.I. 2005 No. 626)
- The Immigration Employment Document (Fees) (Amendment) Regulations 2005 (S.I. 2005 No. 627)
- The Penalties for Disorderly Behaviour (Form of Penalty Notice) (Amendment) Regulations 2005 (S.I. 2005 No. 630)
- The Health and Social Care (Community Health and Standards) Act 2003 (Commission for Healthcare Audit and Inspection) (Transitional Provisions) Order 2005 (S.I. 2005 No. 631)
- The Social Security Benefits Up-rating Regulations 2005 (S.I. 2005 No. 632)
- The Social Security (Industrial Injuries) (Dependency) (Permitted Earnings Limits) Order 2005 (S.I. 2005 No. 633)
- The Regulatory Reform (Joint Nature Conservation Committee) Order 2005 (S.I. 2005 No. 634)
- The Gender Recognition (Disclosure of Information) (England, Wales and Northern Ireland) Order 2005 (S.I. 2005 No. 635)
- The Social Security (Intensive Activity Period 50 to 59 Pilot) Regulations 2005 (S.I. 2005 No. 636)
- The Social Security (Intensive Activity Period 50 to 59 Pilot)(No.2) Regulations 2005 (S.I. 2005 No. 637)
- Gender Recognition (Application Fees) Order 2005 (S.I. 2005 No. 638)
- The Road Transport (Working Time) Regulations 2005 (S.I. 2005 No. 639)
- The National Care Standards Commission (Commission for Social Care Inspection) (Fees and Frequency of Inspections) (Adoption Agencies) (Amendment) Regulations 2005 (S.I. 2005 No. 640)
- The National Health Service (Pharmaceutical Services) Regulations 2005 (S.I. 2005 No. 641)
- The Collection of Fines (Pilot Schemes) (Amendment No 2) Order 2005 (S.I. 2005 No. 642)
- The Criminal Justice Act 2003 (Sentencing) (Transitory Provisions) Order 2005 (S.I. 2005 No. 643)
- The Energy Act 2004 (Nuclear Decommissioning) (Exempt Activities and Further Conditions) Regulations 2005 (S.I. 2005 No. 644)
- The Finance Act 2003, Section 66 (Prescribed Transactions) Order 2005 (S.I. 2005 No. 645)
- The Finance Act 2002, Schedule 26, Parts 2 and 9 (Amendment) Order 2005 (S.I. 2005 No. 646)
- The Commission for Healthcare Audit and Inspection (Fees and Frequency of Inspections) (Amendment) Regulations 2005 (S.I. 2005 No. 647)
- The Criminal Justice (Sentencing) (Licence Conditions) Order 2005 (S.I. 2005 No. 648)
- The Transfer of Employment (Pension Protection) Regulations 2005 (S.I. 2005 No. 649)
- The Pension Protection Fund (Maladministration) Regulations 2005 (S.I. 2005 No. 650)
- The British Nationality (Fees) (Amendment) Regulations 2005 (S.I. 2005 No. 651)
- The Pension Protection Fund (Reviewable Ill Health Pensions) Regulations 2005 (S.I. 2005 No. 652)
- The Travel Documents (Fees) (Amendment) Regulations 2005 (S.I. 2005 No. 653)
- The Immigration (Leave to Remain) (Fees) (Amendment) Regulations 2005 (S.I. 2005 No. 654)
- The Personal Injuries (Civilians) (Amendment) Scheme 2005 (S.I. 2005 No. 655)
- The Civil Procedure (Amendment No. 2) Rules 2005 (S.I. 2005 No. 656 (L.16))
- House of Commons Members' Fund Resolution 2005 (S.I. 2005 No. 657)
- The Non-Domestic Rating (Material Day for List Alterations) (Amendment) (England) Regulations 2005 (S.I. 2005 No. 658)
- The Non-Domestic Rating (Alteration of Lists and Appeals) (England) Regulations 2005 (S.I. 2005 No. 659)
- The Armed Forces (Pensions and Compensation) Act 2004 (Transitional Provision) Order 2005 (S.I. 2005 No. 660)
- The National Health Service (Pension Scheme and Injury Benefits) Amendment Regulations 2005 (S.I. 2005 No. 661)
- The National Assistance (Assessment of Resources) (Amendment) (Wales) Regulations 2005 (S.I. 2005 No. 662 (W.52))
- Rheoliadau Cymorth Gwladol (Asesu Adnoddau) (Diwygio) (Cymru) 2005 (S.I. 2005 Rhif 662 (Cy.52))
- The National Assistance (Sums for Personal Requirements) (Wales) Regulations 2005 (S.I. 2005 No. 663 (W.53))
- Rheoliadau Cymorth Gwladol (Symiau at Anghenion Personol) (Cymru) 2005 (S.I. 2005 Rhif 663 (Cy.53))
- The Local Government (Best Value Performance Indicators) (Wales) (Revocation) Order 2005 (S.I. 2005 No. 664 (W.54))
- Gorchymyn Llywodraeth Leol (Dangosyddion Perfformiad Gwerth Gorau) (Cymru) (Dirymu) 2005 (S.I. 2005 Rhif 664 (Cy.54))
- The Local Government (Best Value Performance Indicators) (Wales) Order 2005 (S.I. 2005 No. 665 (W.55))
- Gorchymyn Llywodraeth Leol (Dangosyddion Perfformiad Gwerth Gorau) (Cymru) 2005 (S.I. 2005 Rhif 665 (Cy.55))
- The Products of Animal Origin (Third Country Imports) (Wales) Regulations 2005 (S.I. 2005 No. 666 (W.56))
- Rheoliadau Cynhyrchion sy'n Dod o Anifeiliaid (Mewnforion Trydydd Gwledydd) (Cymru) 2005 (S.I. 2005 Rhif 666 (Cy.56))
- The Court of Protection (Amendment) Rules 2005 (S.I. 2005 No. 667)
- The Court of Protection (Enduring Powers of Attorney) (Amendment) Rules 2005 (S.I. 2005 No. 668)
- The Pension Protection Fund (Review and Reconsideration of Reviewable Matters) Regulations 2005 (S.I. 2005 No. 669)
- The Pension Protection Fund (Compensation) Regulations 2005 (S.I. 2005 No. 670)
- The Immigration (European Economic Area)(Amendment) (No. 2) Regulations 2005 (S.I. 2005 No. 671)
- The Pension Protection Fund (Valuation) Regulations 2005 (S.I. 2005 No. 672)
- The Detention Centre (Amendment) Rules 2005 (S.I. 2005 No. 673)
- The Pension Protection Fund (Provision of Information) Regulations 2005 (S.I. 2005 No. 674)
- The Pension Protection Fund (Statement of Investment Principles) Regulations 2005 (S.I. 2005 No. 675)
- The Health and Safety (Fees) Regulations 2005 (S.I. 2005 No. 676)
- The Education (Grants etc.) (Dance and Drama) (England) (Amendment) Regulations 2005 (S.I. 2005 No. 677)
- The Occupational Pension Schemes (Employer Debt) Regulations 2005 (S.I. 2005 No. 678)
- The Criminal Justice Act 2003 (Retrial for Serious Offences) Order 2005 (S.I. 2005 No. 679)
- The Financial Services and Markets Act 2000 (Variation of Threshold Conditions) (Amendment) Order 2005 (S.I. 2005 No. 680)
- The Tax Credits Up-rating Regulations 2005 (S.I. 2005 No. 681)
- The Child Benefit and Guardian's Allowance Up-rating Order 2005 (S.I. 2005 No. 682)
- The Child Benefit and Guardian's Allowance Up-rating (Northern Ireland) Order 2005 (S.I. 2005 No. 683)
- The Companies Act 1985 (Power to Enter and Remain on Premises: Procedural) Regulations 2005 (S.I. 2005 No. 684)
- The Pensions Regulator (Freezing Orders and Consequential Amendments) Regulations 2005 (S.I. 2005 No. 686)
- The Patents (Translations) Rules 2005 (S.I. 2005 No. 687)
- The Welfare Food (Amendment) Regulations 2005 (S.I. 2005 No. 688)
- The Consumer Protection (Distance Selling)(Amendment) Regulations 2005 (S.I. 2005 No. 689)
- The Pensions Regulator Tribunal Rules 2005 (S.I. 2005 No. 690)
- The Adoption Support Services Regulations 2005 (S.I. 2005 No. 691)
- The Reporting Standards (Specified Body) Order 2005 (S.I. 2005 No. 692)
- The Local Authorities (Categorisation) (England) Order 2005 (S.I. 2005 No. 694)
- The Pensions Act 2004 (Commencement No. 3, Transitional Provisions and Amendment) Order 2005 (S.I. 2005 No. 695 (C.29))
- The Community Designs (Designation of Community Design Courts) Regulations 2005 (S.I. 2005 No. 696)
- The Accounting Standards (Prescribed Body) Regulations 2005 (S.I. 2005 No. 697)
- The Pensions Increase (Civil Service Injury Benefits Scheme) Regulations 2005 (S.I. 2005 No. 698)
- The Companies (Defective Accounts) (Authorised Person) Order 2005 (S.I. 2005 No. 699)
- The Children Act 2004 (Commencement No. 2) Order 2005 (S.I. 2005 No. 700 (W.59) (C.30))
- Gorchymyn Deddf Plant 2004 (Cychwyn Rhif 2) 2005 (S.I. 2005 Rhif 700 (Cy.59) (C.30))

== 701–800 ==
- The Council Tax (Situation and Valuation of Dwellings) (Wales) (Amendment) Regulations 2005 (S.I. 2005 No. 701 (W.60))
- The Council Tax (Reductions for Disabilities and Transitional Arrangements) (Wales) (Amendment) Regulations 2005 (S.I. 2005 No. 702 (W.61))
- The Occupational Pension Schemes (Independent Trustee) Regulations 2005 (S.I. 2005 No. 703)
- The Personal and Occupational Pension Schemes (Indexation and Disclosure of Information) (Miscellaneous Amendments) Regulations 2005 (S.I. 2005 No. 704)
- The Occupational Pension Schemes (Modification of Pension Protection Provisions) Regulations 2005 (S.I. 2005 No. 705)
- The Occupational Pension Schemes (Winding up etc.) Regulations 2005 (S.I. 2005 No. 706)
- The National Assistance (Sums for Personal Requirements and Assessment of Resources) (Amendment) (England) Regulations 2005 (S.I. 2005 No. 708)
- The Pensions Appeal Tribunals (England and Wales) (Amendment) Rules 2005 (S.I. 2005 No. 709 (L. 17))
- The Anti-social Behaviour Act 2003 (Commencement No. 5) (England) Order 2005 (S.I. 2005 No. 710 (C.31))
- The High Hedges (Appeals) (England) Regulations 2005 (S.I. 2005 No. 711)
- The Charities (National Trust) Order 2005 (SI 2005/712)
- The Certification Officer (Amendment of Fees) Regulations 2005 (S.I. 2005 No. 713)
- The Local Authorities (Functions and Responsibilities) (Amendment) (England) Regulations 2005 (S.I. 2005 No. 714)
- The Supervision of Accounts and Reports (Prescribed Body) Order 2005 (S.I. 2005 No. 715)
- The Income Tax (Indexation) Order 2005 (S.I. 2005 No. 716)
- The Producer Responsibility Obligations (Packaging Waste) (Amendment) (England and Wales) Regulations 2005 (S.I. 2005 No. 717)
- The Inheritance Tax (Indexation) Order 2005 (S.I. 2005 No. 718)
- The Guardian's Allowance Up-rating Regulations 2005 (S.I. 2005 No. 719)
- The Retirement Benefit Schemes (Indexation of Earnings Cap) Order 2005 (S.I. 2005 No. 720)
- The Capital Gains Tax (Annual Exempt Amount) Order 2005 (S.I. 2005 No. 721)
- The Value Added Tax (Consideration for Fuel Provided for Private Use) Order 2005 (S.I. 2005 No. 722)
- The Retirement Benefits Schemes (Increase in Permitted Maximum in Transitional Cases) Order 2005 (S.I. 2005 No. 723)
- The Charge to Income Tax by Reference to Enjoyment of Property Previously Owned Regulations 2005 (S.I. 2005 No. 724)
- The Landfill Tax (Site Restoration, Quarries and Pet Cemeteries) Order 2005 (S.I. 2005 No. 725)
- The Value Added Tax (Reduced Rate) Order 2005 (S.I. 2005 No. 726)
- The Value Added Tax (Increase of Registration Limits) Order 2005 (S.I. 2005 No. 727)
- The Social Security (Contributions) (Amendment No. 2) Regulations 2005 (S.I. 2005 No. 728)
- The Statutory Maternity Pay (General) (Amendment) Regulations 2005 (S.I. 2005 No. 729)
- The Work at Height Regulations 2005 (S.I. 2005 No. 735)
- The Asylum Support (Amendment) (No.2) Regulations 2005 (S.I. 2005 No. 738)
- The Public Audit (Wales) Act 2004 (Consequential Amendments) (Wales) Order 2005 (S.I. 2005 No. 757 (W.62))
- Gorchymyn Deddf Archwilio Cyhoeddus (Cymru) 2004 (Diwygiadau Canlyniadol) (Cymru) 2005 (S.I. 2005 Rhif 757 (Cy.62))
- The Non-Domestic Rating (Alteration of Lists and Appeals) (Wales) Regulations 2005 (S.I. 2005 No. 758 (W.63))
- The Landfill Tax (Amendment) Regulations 2005 (S.I. 2005 No. 759)
- The Fire and Rescue Services (National Framework) (Wales) Order 2005 (S.I. 2005 No. 760 (W.64))
- Gorchymyn y Gwasanaethau Tân ac Achub (Fframwaith Cenedlaethol) (Cymru) 2005 (S.I. 2005 Rhif 760 (Cy.64))
- The Public Audit (Wales) Act 2004 (Consequential Amendments) (Wales) Regulations 2005 (S.I. 2005 No. 761 (W.65))
- Rheoliadau Deddf Archwilio Cyhoeddus (Cymru) 2004 (Diwygiadau Canlyniadol) (Cymru) 2005 (S.I. 2005 Rhif 761 (Cy.65))
- The Value Added Tax (Amendment) Regulations 2005 (S.I. 2005 No. 762)
- The Transport for London (Reserved Services) (Croydon Tramlink and Docklands Light Railway) Exception Order 2005 (S.I. 2005 No. 763)
- The Medicines (Sale or Supply) (Miscellaneous Provisions) Amendment Regulations 2005 (S.I. 2005 No. 764)
- The Medicines for Human Use (Prescribing) Order 2005 (S.I. 2005 No. 765)
- The Medicines (Pharmacy and General Sale—Exemption) Amendment Order 2005 (S.I. 2005 No. 766)
- The Higher Education Act 2004 (Commencement No. 3) Order 2005 (S.I. 2005 No. 767 (C. 32))
- The Medicines for Human Use (Marketing Authorisations Etc.) Amendment Regulations 2005 (S.I. 2005 No. 768)
- The Working Tax Credit (Entitlement and Maximum Rate) (Amendment) Regulations 2005 (S.I. 2005 No. 769)
- The Section 318C Income Tax (Earnings and Pensions) Act 2003 (Amendment) Regulations 2005 (S.I. 2005 No. 770)
- The Immigration (Leave to Remain) (Prescribed Forms and Procedures) Regulations 2005 (S.I. 2005 No. 771)
- The Civil Contingencies Act 2004 (Commencement No.2) Order 2005 (S.I. 2005 No. 772 (C. 33))
- The Tax Credits Act 2002 (Transitional Provisions) Order 2005 (S.I. 2005 No. 773)
- The Children Act 2004 (Amendment of Miscellaneous Regulations) (Wales) Regulations 2005 (S.I. 2005 No. 774 (W.64))
- Rheoliadau Deddf Plant 2004 (Diwygio Rheoliadau Amrywiol) (Cymru) 2005 (S.I. 2005 Rhif 774 (Cy.64))
- The Contaminants in Food (England) (Amendment) Regulations 2005 (S.I. 2005 No. 775)
- The Tax Credits Act 2002 (Transitional Provisions) (No.2) Order 2005 (S.I. 2005 No. 776)
- The Social Security (Claims and Payments) Amendment (No. 2) Regulations 2005 (S.I. 2005 No. 777)
- The Social Security (Contributions) (Amendment No. 3) Regulations 2005 (S.I. 2005 No. 778)
- The Road Traffic (Permitted Parking Area and Special Parking Area) (County of Hertfordshire) (District of Welwyn Hatfield) Order 2005 (S.I. 2005 No. 779)
- The Parliamentary Elections (Returning Officers' Charges) Order 2005 (S.I. 2005 No. 780)
- The Pensions Regulator Tribunal (Legal Assistance Scheme) Regulations 2005 (S.I. 2005 No. 781)
- The Pensions Regulator Tribunal (Legal Assistance Scheme – Costs) Regulations 2005 (S.I. 2005 No. 782)
- The Child Support (Miscellaneous Amendments) Regulations 2005 (S.I. 2005 No. 785)

== 801–900 ==
- The Social Security (Inherited SERPS) (Amendment) Regulations 2005 (S.I. 2005 No. 811)
- The Pension Protection Fund (PPF Ombudsman) Order 2005 (S.I. 2005 No. 824)
- The Pension Protection Fund (Pension Compensation Cap) Order 2005 (S.I. 2005 No. 825)
- The Income Tax (Incentive Payments for Voluntary Electronic Communication of PAYE Returns) (Amendment) Regulations 2005 (S.I. 2005 No. 826)
- The Countryside and Rights of Way Act 2000 (Commencement No. 7) Order 2005 (S.I. 2005 No. 827 (C. 34))
- The Tax Credits Notification of Changes of Circumstances (Civil Partnership) (Transitional Provisions) Order 2005 (S.I. 2005 No. 828)
- The Crime Prevention (Designated Areas) Order 2005 (S.I. 2005 No. 829)
- The Equipment and Protective Systems Intended for Use in Potentially Explosive Atmospheres (Amendment) Regulations 2005 (S.I. 2005 No. 830)
- The Supply of Machinery (Safety) (Amendment) Regulations 2005 (S.I. 2005 No. 831)
- The Workmen's Compensation (Supplementation) (Amendment) Scheme 2005 (S.I. 2005 No. 832)
- The Damages (Variation of Periodical Payments) Order 2005 (S.I. 2005 No. 841)
- The Occupational Pension Schemes (Levies) Regulations 2005 (S.I. 2005 No. 842)
- The Town and Country Planning (Fees for Applications and Deemed Applications) (Amendment) (England) Regulations 2005 (S.I. 2005 No. 843)
- The Stamp Duty Land Tax (Electronic Communications) Regulations 2005 (S.I. 2005 No. 844)
- The Education (Amendments to Regulations Requiring the Publication of Pupil Performance Information) (England) Regulations 2005 (S.I. 2005 No. 845)
- The Social Security (Graduated Retirement Benefit) (Amendment) Regulations 2005 (S.I. 2005 No. 846)
- The Children Act 2004 (Commencement No. 3) Order 2005 (S.I. 2005 No. 847 (C.35))
- The Opticians Act 1989 (Amendment) Order 2005 (S.I. 2005 No. 848)
- The Scotland Act 1998 (Transfer of Functions to the Scottish Ministers etc.) Order 2005 (S.I. 2005 No. 849 (S. 2))
- The European Communities (Designation) Order 2005 (S.I. 2005 No. 850)
- The Naval, Military and Air Forces Etc. (Disablement and Death) Service Pensions (Amendment) Order 2005 (S.I. 2005 No. 851)
- The Copyright and Performances (Application to Other Countries) Order 2005 (S.I. 2005 No. 852)
- The Copyright (Gibraltar) Order 2005 (S.I. 2005 No. 853)
- The Chemical Weapons (Overseas Territories) Order 2005 (S.I. 2005 No. 854)
- The Communications (Jersey) (Amendment) Order 2005 (S.I. 2005 No. 855)
- The Communications (Bailiwick of Guernsey) (Amendment) Order 2005 (S.I. 2005 No. 856)
- The Public Processions (Amendment) (Northern Ireland) Order 2005 (S.I. 2005 No. 857 (N.I. 2))
- The Pensions Increase (Review) Order 2005 (S.I. 2005 No. 858)
- The Reserve Forces (Call-out and Recall) (Financial Assistance) Regulations 2005 (S.I. 2005 No. 859)
- The Budget (Northern Ireland) Order 2005 (S.I. 2005 No. 860 (N.I. 3))
- The District Policing Partnerships (Northern Ireland) Order 2005 (S.I. 2005 No. 861 (N.I. 4))
- Electoral Law Act (Northern Ireland) 1962 (Amendment) Order 2005 (S.I. 2005 No. 862)
- The Electoral Law Act (Northern Ireland) 1962 (Amendment No. 2) Order 2005 (S.I. 2005 No. 863)
- The Electoral Law Act (Northern Ireland) 1962 (Amendment No. 3) Order 2005 (S.I. 2005 No. 864)
- The Scotland Act 1998 (Modifications of Schedule 5) Order 2005 (S.I. 2005 No. 865 (S. 3))
- The Scotland Act 1998 (Modifications of Schedule 5) (No. 2) Order 2005 (S.I. 2005 No. 866 (S. 4))
- The Recreation Grounds (Revocation of Parish Council Byelaws) Order 2005 (S.I. 2005 No. 867)
- The Northern Ireland Act 2000 (Modification) Order 2005 (S.I. 2005 No. 868)
- The Prison (Amendment) Rules 2005 (S.I. 2005 No. 869)
- The Social Security Commissioners (Procedure) (Amendment) Regulations 2005 (S.I. 2005 No. 870)
- The Regulatory Reform (Trading Stamps) Order 2005 (S.I. 2005 No. 871)
- The Employment Relations Act 2004 (Commencement No.3 and Transitional Provisions) Order 2005 (S.I. 2005 No. 872 (C.36))
- The Education (Variation of Admission Arrangements) (England) (Amendment) Regulations 2005 (S.I. 2005 No. 873)
- The Gender Recognition (Approved Countries and Territories) Order 2005 (S.I. 2005 No. 874)
- The Education (Head Teachers' Qualifications) (Amendment) (England) Regulations 2005 (S.I. 2005 No. 875)
- The Carers (Equal Opportunities) Act 2004 (Commencement) (England) Order 2005 (S.I. 2005 No. 876 (C.37))
- The Energy Act 2004 (Commencement No. 5) Order 2005 (S.I. 2005 No. 877 (C. 38))
- The Social Security (Contributions) (Re-rating and National Insurance Funds Payments) Order 2005 (S.I. 2005 No. 878)
- The Insolvency Act 1986 (Amendment) Regulations 2005 (S.I. 2005 No. 879)
- The Landfill Allowances and Trading Scheme (England)(Amendment) Regulations 2005 (S.I. 2005 No. 880)
- The Merchant Shipping (Accident Reporting and Investigation) Regulations 2005 (S.I. 2005 No. 881)
- The European Communities (Recognition of Professional Qualifications) (Second General System) (Amendment) Regulations 2005 (S.I. 2005 No. 882)
- The Waste Management Licensing (England and Wales) (Amendment and Related Provisions) Regulations 2005 (S.I. 2005 No. 883)
- The Energy Act 2004 (Designation of Companies and Designated Date) Order 2005 (S.I. 2005 No. 884)
- The Education (Free School Lunches) (State Pension Credit) Order 2005 (S.I. 2005 No. 885)
- The Courts Act 2003 (Consequential Provisions) Order 2005 (S.I. 2005 No. 886)
- The Parliamentary Pension (Amendment) Regulations 2005 (S.I. 2005 No. 887)
- The Disclosure of Adoption Information (Post-Commencement Adoptions) Regulations 2005 (S.I. 2005 No. 888)
- The Corporation Tax (Instalment Payments) (Amendment) Regulations 2005 (S.I. 2005 No. 889)
- The Adoption Information and Intermediary Services (Pre-Commencement Adoptions) Regulations 2005 (S.I. 2005 No. 890)
- The Occupational Pension Schemes (Contracting-out) (Amount Required for Restoring State Scheme Rights) Amendment Regulations 2005 (S.I. 2005 No. 891)
- The Teacher Training Agency (Additional Functions) (England) Order 2005 (S.I. 2005 No. 892)
- The National Health Service (Primary Medical Services) (Miscellaneous Amendments) Regulations 2005 (S.I. 2005 No. 893)
- The Hazardous Waste (England and Wales)Regulations 2005 (S.I. 2005 No. 894)
- The List of Wastes (England) Regulations 2005 (S.I. 2005 No. 895)
- The General Medical Council (Legal Assessors) (Amendment) Rules 2005 (S.I. 2005 No. 896)
- The Young Offender Institution (Amendment) Rules 2005 (S.I. 2005 No. 897)
- The Materials and Articles in Contact with Food (England) Regulations 2005 (S.I. 2005 No. 898)
- The Food Labelling (Amendment) (England) Regulations 2005 (S.I. 2005 No. 899)
- The Pensions Regulator (Notifiable Events) Regulations 2005 (S.I. 2005 No. 900)

== 901–1000 ==
- The Public Processions (Northern Ireland) Act 1998 (Code of Conduct) Order 2005 (S.I. 2005 No. 901)
- The Crime and Disorder Act 1998 (Service of Prosecution Evidence) Regulations 2005 (S.I. 2005 No. 902)
- The Public Processions (Northern Ireland) Act 1998 (Procedural Rules) Order 2005 (S.I. 2005 No. 903)
- The Public Order (Prescribed Forms) Regulations (Northern Ireland) 2005 (S.I. 2005 No. 904)
- The Public Processions (Northern Ireland) Act 1998 (Guidelines) Order 2005 (S.I. 2005 No. 905)
- The Plant Health (Import Inspection Fees) (England) Regulations 2005 (S.I. 2005 No. 906)
- The Child Trust Funds (Appeals) (Northern Ireland) Regulations 2005 (S.I. 2005 No. 907)
- The Regulatory Reform (Prison Officers) (Industrial Action) Order 2005 (S.I. 2005 No. 908)
- The Child Trust Funds (Amendment No. 2) Regulations 2005 (S.I. 2005 No. 909)
- The Courts Act 2003 (Commencement No. 10) Order 2005 (S.I. 2005 No. 910 (C. 39))
- The Courts Act 2003 (Transitional Provisions, Savings and Consequential Provisions) Order 2005 (S.I. 2005 No. 911)
- The Gender Recognition Register Regulations 2005 (S.I. 2005 No. 912)
- The Government Resources and Accounts Act 2000 (Audit of Public Bodies) Order 2005 (S.I. 2005 No. 913)
- The Crime Prevention (Designated Areas) (No.2) Order 2005 (S.I. 2005 No. 914)
- The Social Security (Contributions) (Re-rating) Consequential Amendment Regulations 2005 (S.I. 2005 No. 915)
- The Gender Recognition (Disclosure of Information) (England, Wales and Northern Ireland) (No. 2) Order 2005 (S.I. 2005 No. 916)
- The Enterprise Act 2002 (Part 8) (Designation of the Consumers' Association) Order 2005 (S.I. 2005 No. 917)
- The Common Agricultural Policy Single Payment and Support Schemes (Cross Compliance) (England) (Amendment) Regulations 2005 (S.I. 2005 No. 918)
- The Human Tissue Act 2004 (Commencement No.1) Order 2005 (S.I. 2005 No. 919 (C.40))
- The Water Supply (Fluoridation Indemnities) (England) Regulations 2005 (S.I. 2005 No. 920)
- The Water Fluoridation (Consultation) (England) Regulations 2005 (S.I. 2005 No. 921)
- The Financial Services and Markets Act 2000 (Carrying on Regulated Activities by Way of Business) (Amendment) Order 2005 (S.I. 2005 No. 922)
- The Open-Ended Investment Companies (Amendment) Regulations 2005 (S.I. 2005 No. 923)
- The Adopted Children and Adoption Contact Registers Regulations 2005 (S.I. 2005 No. 924)
- The Greenhouse Gas Emissions Trading Scheme Regulations 2005 (S.I. 2005 No. 925)
- The Renewables Obligation Order 2005 (S.I. 2005 No. 926)
- The Midland Metro (Wednesbury to Brierley Hill and Miscellaneous Amendments) Order 2005 (S.I. 2005 No. 927)
- The Export and Import of Dangerous Chemicals Regulations 2005 (S.I. 2005 No. 928)
- The Local Authorities (Functions and Responsibilities) (Amendment) (No. 2) (England) Regulations 2005 (S.I. 2005 No. 929)
- The Immigration and Asylum (Provision of Accommodation to Failed Asylum-Seekers) Regulations 2005 (S.I. 2005 No. 930)
- The Pensions Regulator (Contribution Notices and Restoration Orders) Regulations 2005 (S.I. 2005 No. 931)
- The Crime (Sentences) Act 1997 (Commencement No.4) Order 2005 (S.I. 2005 No. 932 (C. 41))
- The Criminal Justice Act 2003 (Commencement No.8 and Transitional and Saving Provisions) Order 2005 (S.I. 2005 No. 950 (C.42))
- The Criminal Justice (Sentencing) (Programme and Electronic Monitoring Requirements) Order 2005 (S.I. 2005 No. 963)
- The Air Navigation (Restriction of Flying) (Specified Area) Regulations 2005 (S.I. 2005 No. 964)
- The Pensions Appeal Commissioners (Procedure) (Northern Ireland) Regulations 2005 (S.I. 2005 No. 965)
- The Community Legal Service (Asylum and Immigration Appeals) Regulations 2005 (S.I. 2005 No. 966)
- The Water Act 2003 (Commencement No. 4, Transitional Provisions and Savings) Order 2005 (S.I. 2005 No. 968 (C.43 ))
- The Civil Aviation (Denied Boarding, Compensation and Assistance) Regulations 2005 (S.I. 2005 No. 975)
- The Exclusion Order (Monitoring of Offenders) Order 2005 (S.I. 2005 No. 979)
- The Electronic Monitoring (Responsible Officers) (Amendment) Order 2005 (S.I. 2005 No. 984)
- Criminal Procedure and Investigations Act 1996 (Code of Practice) Order 2005 (S.I. 2005 No. 985)
- The Criminal Justice (Sentencing) (Curfew Condition) Order 2005 (S.I. 2005 No. 986)
- The Polehampton Church of England Junior School (Designation as having a Religious Character) Order 2005 (S.I. 2005 No. 987)
- The All Saints College (Designation as having a Religious Character) Order 2005 (S.I. 2005 No. 988)
- The Statutory Maternity Pay (General) and Statutory Sick Pay (General) (Amendment) Regulations 2005 (S.I. 2005 No. 989)
- The Child Trust Funds (Appeals) Regulations 2005 (S.I. 2005 No. 990)
- The Non-Domestic Rating (Chargeable Amounts) (England) (Amendment) Regulations 2005 (S.I. 2005 No. 991)
- The Occupational and Personal Pension Schemes (Pension Liberation) Regulations 2005 (S.I. 2005 No. 992)
- The Occupational Pension Schemes and Pension Protection Fund (Amendment) Regulations 2005 (S.I. 2005 No. 993)

== 1001–1100 ==
- The Companies Act 1985 (Operating and Financial Review and Directors' Report etc.) Regulations 2005 (S.I. 2005 No. 1011)
- The Courts Act 2003 (Consequential and Transitional Provisions) Order 2005 (S.I. 2005 No. 1012)
- The National Health Service (Pharmaceutical Services) (Amendment) (Wales) Regulations 2005 (S.I. 2005 No. 1013 (W.67))
- The Education (Residential Trips) (Prescribed Tax Credits) (England) (Amendment) Regulations 2005 (S.I. 2005 No. 1014)
- The National Health Service (Pharmaceutical Services) Amendment Regulations 2005 (S.I. 2005 No. 1015)
- The Asylum (Designated States) (Amendment) Order 2005 (S.I. 2005 No. 1016)
- The Housing (Right to Buy) (Prescribed Forms) (Revocation) (England) Regulations 2005 (S.I. 2005 No. 1017)
- The Public Audit (Wales) Act 2004 (Relaxation of Restriction on Disclosure) Order 2005 (S.I. 2005 No. 1018)
- The Electricity (Standards of Performance) Regulations 2005 (S.I. 2005 No. 1019)
- The Pensions Appeal Tribunals (Armed Forces and Reserve Forces Compensation Scheme) (Rights of Appeal) Regulations 2005 (S.I. 2005 No. 1029)
- The Social Security Commissioners (Procedure) (Child Trust Funds) Regulations 2005 (S.I. 2005 No. 1031)
- The Education (Review of Staffing Structure) (England) Regulations 2005 (S.I. 2005 No. 1032)
- The Feedingstuffs (Zootechnical Products) and Medicated Feedingstuffs (Amendment) (England, Scotlandand Wales) Regulations 2005 (S.I. 2005 No. 1033)
- The Norfolk and Suffolk Broads Act 1988 (Alteration of Constitution of the Broads Authority) Order 2005 (S.I. 2005 No. 1067)
- The Disability Discrimination (Educational Institutions) (Alteration of Leasehold Premises) Regulations 2005 (S.I. 2005 No. 1070)
- The Human Rights Act 1998 (Amendment) Order 2005 (S.I. 2005 No. 1071)
- The Regulatory Reform (National Health Service Charitable and Non-Charitable Trust Accounts and Audit) Order 2005 (S.I. 2005 No. 1074)
- The Manufacture and Storage of Explosives Regulations 2005 (S.I. 2005 No. 1082)
- The Regulation of Investigatory Powers (Communications Data) (Amendment) Order 2005 (S.I. 2005 No. 1083)
- The Regulation of Investigatory Powers (Directed Surveillance and Covert Human Intelligence Sources) (Amendment) Order 2005 (S.I. 2005 No. 1084)
- The Planning (Listed Buildings and Conservation Areas) (Amendment) (England) Regulations 2005 (S.I. 2005 No. 1085)
- The Social Security (Contributions) (Amendment No. 4) Regulations 2005 (S.I. 2005 No. 1086)
- The Common Agricultural Policy Single Payment and Support Schemes (Amendment) Regulations 2005 (S.I. 2005 No. 1087)
- The Control of Major Accident Hazards (Amendment) Regulations 2005 (S.I. 2005 No. 1088)
- The Civil Aviation (Insurance) Regulations 2005 (S.I. 2005 No. 1089)
- The Criminal Justice and Police Act 2001 (Amendment) Order 2005 (S.I. 2005 No. 1090)
- The Income Tax (Professional Fees) Order 2005 (S.I. 2005 No. 1091)
- The Merchant Shipping (Amendments to Reporting Requirements) Regulations 2005 (S.I. 2005 No. 1092)
- Control of Vibration at Work Regulations 2005 (S.I. 2005 No. 1093)
- The Medicines (Advisory Bodies) Regulations 2005 (S.I. 2005 No. 1094)
- The Railways (Penalty Fares) (Amendment) Regulations 2005 (S.I. 2005 No. 1095)
- The Carers (Equal Opportunities) Act 2004 (Isles of Scilly) Order 2005 (S.I. 2005 No. 1096)
- The Community Legal Service (Financial) (Amendment No. 2) Regulations 2005 (S.I. 2005 No. 1097)
- The Blood Safety and Quality (Amendment) Regulations 2005 (S.I. 2005 No. 1098)
- The Miscellaneous Food Additives (Amendment) (England) Regulations 2005 (S.I. 2005 No. 1099)
- The National Health Service (Standing Advisory Committees) Amendment Order 2005 (S.I. 2005 No. 1100)

== 1101–1200 ==
- The Education (School Teachers' Pay and Conditions) (No. 2) Order 2005 (S.I. 2005 No. 1101)
- The New Opportunities Fund (Specification of Initiative) Order 2005 (S.I. 2005 No. 1102)
- The Contracting Out (Functions in Relation to Cultural Objects) Order 2005 (S.I. 2005 No. 1103)
- The Private Security Industry Act 2001 (Commencement No. 9) Order 2005 (S.I. 2005 No. 1104 (C.44))
- The Parliamentary Elections (Welsh Forms) Order 2005 (S.I. 2005 No. 1105)
- The Tax Credits Act 2002 (Commencement No. 4, Transitional Provisions and Savings) (Amendment) Order 2005 (S.I. 2005 No. 1106 (C. 45))
- The Private Security Industry Act 2001 (Designated Activities) (No. 2) Order 2005 (S.I. 2005 No. 1107)
- The Pensions Act 2004 (Commencement No. 4 and Amendment) Order 2005 (S.I. 2005 No. 1108 (C. 46))
- The Special Guardianship Regulations 2005 (S.I. 2005 No. 1109)
- The Rules of the Air (Amendment) Regulations 2005 (S.I. 2005 No. 1110)
- The Civil Partnership Act 2004 (Commencement No. 1) Order 2005 (S.I. 2005 No. 1112 (C.47))
- The Crawley College and Haywards Heath College (Dissolution) Order 2005 (S.I. 2005 No. 1113)
- The Energy-Saving Items Regulations 2005 (S.I. 2005 No. 1114)
- The Chelsea and Westminster Healthcare National Health Service Trust (Trust Funds: Appointment of Trustees) Order 2005 (S.I. 2005 No. 1115)
- The Higher Education (Northern Ireland) Order 2005 (S.I. 2005 No. 1116 (N.I. 5))
- The Special Educational Needs and Disability (Northern Ireland) Order 2005 (S.I. 2005 No. 1117 (N.I. 6))
- The Armed Forces Act 1996 (Commencement No. 5) Order 2005 (S.I. 2005 No. 1119 (C.48 ))
- The Housing Act 2004 (Commencement No. 2) (England) Order 2005 (S.I. 2005 No. 1120 (C.49))
- The Disability Discrimination (Providers of Services) (Adjustment of Premises) (Amendment) Regulations 2005 (S.I. 2005 No. 1121)
- The Disability Discrimination Act 1995 (Commencement No. 11) Order 2005 (S.I. 2005 No. 1122 (C.50))
- The Medicines for Human Use (Fees Amendments) Regulations 2005 (S.I. 2005 No. 1124)
- The Employment Zones (Allocation to Contractors) Pilot Regulations 2005 (S.I. 2005 No. 1125)
- The Commissioners for Revenue and Customs Act 2005 (Commencement) Order 2005 (S.I. 2005 No. 1126 (C. 51))
- The Extradition Act 2003 (Part 3 Designation) (Amendment) Order 2005 (S.I. 2005 No. 1127)
- The Bail (Amendment) Act 1993 (Prescription of Prosecuting Authorities) (Amendment) Order 2005 (S.I. 2005 No. 1129)
- The Crime (International Co-operation) Act 2003 (Designation of Prosecuting Authorities) (Amendment) Order 2005 (S.I. 2005 No. 1130)
- The Orders for the Delivery of Documents (Procedure) (Amendment) Regulations 2005 (S.I. 2005 No. 1131)
- The Stamp Duty Land Tax (Administration) (Amendment) Regulations 2005 (S.I. 2005 No. 1132)
- The Revenue and Customs (Inspections) Regulations 2005 (S.I. 2005 No. 1133)
- The Horserace Betting and Olympic Lottery Act 2004 (Commencement No. 2) Order 2005 (S.I. 2005 No. 1134 (C. 52))
- The Gas (Standards of Performance) Regulations 2005 (S.I. 2005 No. 1135)
- The Gas (Standards of Performance) (Amendment) Regulations 2005 (S.I. 2005 No. 1136)
- The Margate Pier (Turner Centre) Order 2005 (S.I. 2005 No. 1137)
- The Judicial Committee (Devolution Issues) Rules (Amendment) Order 2005 (S.I. 2005 No. 1138)
- The Judicial Committee (General Appellate Jurisdiction) Rules (Amendment) Order 2005 (S.I. 2005 No. 1139)
- The Passenger and Goods Vehicles (Recording Equipment) (Tachograph Card Fees) Regulations 2005 (S.I. 2005 No. 1140)
- The Langstone (Pilotage) Harbour Revision Order 2005 (S.I. 2005 No. 1141)
- The A21 Trunk Road (Lamberhurst Bypass) (24 Hours Clearway) Order 2005 (S.I. 2005 No. 1142)
- The A21 Trunk Road (Lamberhurst) (Derestriction) Order 2005 (S.I. 2005 No. 1143)
- The A428 Trunk Road (Caxton Gibbet to Cambourne Improvement) Order 2005 (S.I. 2005 No. 1149)
- The A428 Trunk Road (Caxton Gibbet to Cambourne Improvement) (Detrunking) Order 2005 (S.I. 2005 No. 1150)
- The A428 Trunk Road (Cambourne to Hardwick Improvement and Slip Roads) Order 2005 (S.I. 2005 No. 1151)
- The A428 Trunk Road (Cambourne to Hardwick Improvement) (Detrunking) Order 2005 (S.I. 2005 No. 1152)
- The Carers (Equal Opportunities) Act 2004 (Commencement) (Wales) Order 2005 (S.I. 2005 No. 1153 (W.70) (C.53))
- Gorchymyn Deddf Gofalwyr (Cyfleoedd Cyfartal) 2004 (Cychwyn) (Cymru) 2005 (S.I. 2005 Rhif 1153 (Cy.70) (C.53))
- The Countryside Access (Appeals Procedures) (Wales) (Amendment) Regulations 2005 (S.I. 2005 No. 1154 (W.71))
- Rheoliadau Mynediad i Gefn Gwlad (Gweithdrefnau Apelau) (Cymru) (Diwygio) 2005 (S.I. 2005 Rhif 1154 (Cy.71))
- The Marketing of Fruit Plant Material (Amendment) (Wales) Regulations 2005 (S.I. 2005 No. 1155 (W.72))
- Rheoliadau Marchnata Deunyddiau Planhigion Ffrwythau (Diwygio) (Cymru) 2005 (S.I. 2005 Rhif 1155 (Cy.72))
- The Sweeteners in Food (Amendment) (Wales) Regulations 2005 (S.I. 2005 No. 1156 (W.73))
- Rheoliadau Melysyddion mewn Bwyd (Diwygio) (Cymru) 2005 (S.I. 2005 Rhif 1156 (Cy.73))
- The Air Quality Limit Values (Wales) (Amendment) Regulations 2005 (S.I. 2005 No. 1157 (W.74))
- Rheoliadau Gwerthoedd Terfyn Ansawdd Aer (Cymru) (Diwygio) 2005 (S.I. 2005 Rhif 1157 (Cy.74))
- The Animals and Animal Products (Import and Export) (Wales) Regulations 2005 (S.I. 2005 No. 1158 (W.75))
- Rheoliadau Anifeiliaid a Chynhyrchion Anifeiliaid (Mewnforio ac Allforio) (Cymru) 2005 (S.I. 2005 Rhif 1158 (Cy.75))
- The Immigration (Leave to Enter and Remain) (Amendment) Order 2005 (S.I. 2005 No. 1159)
- The Parliamentary Elections (Returning Officer's Charges) (Northern Ireland) Order 2005 (S.I. 2005 No. 1160)
- The Potatoes Originating in the Netherlands (Revocation) (Wales) Regulations 2005 (S.I. 2005 No. 1161 (W.76))
- Rheoliadau Tatws sy'n Tarddu o'r Iseldiroedd (Dirymu) (Cymru) 2005 (S.I. 2005 Rhif 1161 (Cy.76))
- The Potatoes Originating in the Netherlands (Notification) (Wales) Order 2005 (S.I. 2005 No. 1162 (W.77))
- Gorchymyn Tatws sy'n Tarddu o'r Iseldiroedd (Hysbysu) (Cymru) 2005 (S.I. 2005 Rhif 1162 (Cy.77))
- The Telford Railfreight Terminal (Donnington) Order 2005 (S.I. 2005 No. 1163)
- The Designation of Schools Having a Religious Character (Independent Schools) (England) Order 2005 (S.I. 2005 No. 1195)

== 1201–1300 ==
- The Adoption and Children Act 2002 (Commencement No. 8) (Wales) Order 2005 (S.I. 2005 No. 1206 (W.78) (C.54))
- Gorchymyn Deddf Mabwysiadu a Phlant 2002 (Cychwyn Rhif 8) (Cymru) 2005 (S.I. 2005 Rhif 1206 (Cy.78) (C.54))
- The Fodder Plant Seed (Wales) Regulations 2005 (S.I. 2005 No. 1207 (W.79))
- The School Lunches (Prescribed Requirement) (Wales) Order 2005 (S.I. 2005 No. 1208 (W.80))
- Gorchymyn Ciniawau Ysgol (Gofyniad Rhagnodedig) (Cymru) 2005 (S.I. 2005 Rhif 1208 (Cy.80))
- The Food with Added Phytosterols or Phytostanols (Labelling) (Wales) Regulations 2005 (S.I. 2005 No. 1224 (W.82))
- Rheoliadau Bwyd â Ffytosterolau neu Ffytostanolau Ychwanegol (Labelu) (Cymru) 2005 (S.I. 2005 Rhif 1224 (Cy.82))
- The Anti-social Behaviour Act 2003 (Commencement No.4) (Wales) Order 2005 (S.I. 2005 No. 1225 (W.83) (C.55))
- Gorchymyn Deddf Ymddygiad Gwrthgymdeithasol 2003 (Cychwyn Rhif 4) (Cymru) 2005 (S.I. 2005 Rhif 1225 (Cy.83) (C.55))
- The Secure Tenancies (Notices) (Amendment) (Wales) Regulations 2005 (S.I. 2005 No. 1226 (W.84))
- Rheoliadau Tenantiaethau Diogel (Hysbysiadau) (Diwygio) (Cymru) 2005 (S.I. 2005 Rhif 1226 (Cy.84))
- The Head Teachers' Qualifications and Registration (Wales) Regulations 2005 (S.I. 2005 No. 1227 (W.85))
- Rheoliadau Cymwysterau a Chofrestru Prifathrawon (Cymru) 2005 (S.I. 2005 Rhif 1227 (Cy.85))
- The Demoted Tenancies (Review of Decisions) (Wales) Regulations 2005 (S.I. 2005 No. 1228 (W.86))
- Rheoliadau Tenantiaethau Isradd (Adolygu Penderfyniadau) (Cymru) 2005 (S.I. 2005 Rhif 1228 (Cy.86))
- The Planning and Compulsory Purchase Act 2004 (Commencement No.3 and Consequential and Transitional Provisions) (Wales) Order 2005 (S.I. 2005 No. 1229 (W.87) (C.56))
- Gorchymyn Deddf Cynllunio a Phrynu Gorfodol 2004 (Cychwyn Rhif 3 a Darpariaethau Canlyniadol a Throsiannol) (Cymru) 2005 (S.I. 2005 Rhif 1229 (Cy.87) (C.56))
- The Bishop Justus C of E School (Designation as having a Religious Character) Order 2005 (S.I. 2005 No. 1230)
- The Holy Trinity Catholic Primary School (Designation as having a Religious Character) Order 2005 (S.I. 2005 No. 1231)
- The Hertsmere Jewish High School (Designation as having a Religious Character) Order 2005 (S.I. 2005 No. 1232)
- The St Benedict's Catholic VA Primary School (Designation as having a Religious Character) Order 2005 (S.I. 2005 No. 1233)
- The Sudan (United Nations Measures) (Overseas Territories) Order 2005 (S.I. 2005 No. 1258)
- The Sudan (United Nations Measures) Order 2005 (S.I. 2005 No. 1259)
- The Child Abduction and Custody (Parties to Conventions) (Amendment) Order 2005 (S.I. 2005 No. 1260)
- The Tax Information Exchange Agreement (Taxes on Income) (Jersey) Order 2005 (S.I. 2005 No. 1261)
- The Tax Information Exchange Agreement (Taxes on Income) (Guernsey) Order 2005 (S.I. 2005 No. 1262)
- The Tax Information Exchange Agreement (Taxes on Income) (Isle of Man) Order 2005 (S.I. 2005 No. 1263)
- The Feed (Corn Gluten Feed and Brewers Grains) (Emergency Control) (England) Regulations 2005 (S.I. 2005 No. 1265)
- The A11 Trunk Road (Attleborough Bypass Improvement) Slip Roads Order 2005 (S.I. 2005 No. 1266)
- The Criminal Justice Act 2003 (Commencement No. 9) Order 2005 (S.I. 2005 No. 1267 (C. 57))
- The St Luke's CEC Primary School (Designation as having a Religious Character) Order 2005 (S.I. 2005 No. 1268)
- The Tir Mynydd (Wales) (Amendment) Regulations 2005 (S.I. 2005 No. 1269 (W. 89))
- Rheoliadau Tir Mynydd (Cymru) (Diwygio) 2005 (S.I. 2005 Rhif 1269 (Cy.89))
- The Countryside Access (Means of Access, Appeals etc.) (Wales) Regulations 2005 (S.I. 2005 No. 1270 (W.90))
- Rheoliadau Mynediad i Gefn Gwlad (Dull Mynediad, Apelau etc.) (Cymru) 2005 (S.I. 2005 Rhif 1270 (Cy.90))
- The A21 Trunk Road (School Hill and Spray Hill, Lamberhurst) (Restricted Road) Order 2005 (S.I. 2005 No. 1300)

== 1301–1400 ==
- The M40 Motorway Junction 4 (Handy Cross) Connecting Road Scheme 2005 (S.I. 2005 No. 1301)
- The Health and Safety at Work etc. Act 1974 (Application to Environmentally Hazardous Substances) (Amendment) Regulations 2005 (S.I. 2005 No. 1308)
- The Food Labelling (Amendment) (Wales) Regulations 2005 (S.I. 2005 No. 1309 (W.91))
- Rheoliadau Labelu Bwyd (Diwygio) (Cymru) 2005 (S.I. 2005 Rhif 1309 (Cy.91))
- The Poultry Meat, Farmed Game Bird Meat and Rabbit Meat (Hygiene and Inspection) (Amendment) (Wales) Regulations 2005 (S.I. 2005 No. 1310 (W.92))
- Rheoliadau Cig Dofednod, Cig Adar Hela wedi'i Ffermio a Chig Cwningod (Hylendid ac Archwilio) (Diwygio) (Cymru) 2005 (S.I. 2005 Rhif 1310 (Cy.92))
- The Miscellaneous Food Additives (Amendment) (No.2) (Wales) Regulations 2005 (S.I. 2005 No. 1311 (W.93))
- Rheoliadau Ychwanegion Bwyd Amrywiol (Diwygio) (Rhif 2) (Cymru) 2005 (S.I. 2005 Rhif 1311 (Cy.93))
- The Business Improvement Districts (Wales) Regulations 2005 (S.I. 2005 No. 1312 (W.94))
- Rheoliadau Ardaloedd Gwella Busnes (Cymru) 2005 (S.I. 2005 Rhif 1312 (Cy.94))
- The Adoption Agencies (Wales) Regulations 2005 (S.I. 2005 No. 1313 (W.95))
- Rheoliadau Asiantaethau Mabwysiadu (Cymru) 2005 (S.I. 2005 Rhif 1313 (Cy.95))
- The Countryside and Rights of Way Act 2000 (Commencement No. 7) (Wales) Order 2005 (S.I. 2005 No. 1314 (W.96) (C.58))
- Gorchymyn Deddf Cefn Gwlad a Hawliau Tramwy 2000 (Cychwyn Rhif 7) (Cymru) 2005 (S.I. 2005 Rhif 1314 (Cy.96) (C.58))
- The Feed (Corn Gluten Feed and Brewers Grains) (Emergency Control) (Wales) Regulations 2005 (S.I. 2005 No. 1323 (W.97))
- The Education (Student Support) (Amendment) Regulations 2005 (S.I. 2005 No. 1341)
- The Smoke Flavourings (Wales) Regulations 2005 (S.I. 2005 No. 1350 (W.98))
- Rheoliadau Cyflasynnau Mwg (Cymru) 2005 (S.I. 2005 Rhif 1350 (Cy.98))
- The Housing (Right to Buy) (Priority of Charges) (Wales) Order 2005 (S.I. 2005 No. 1351 (W.99))
- Gorchymyn Tai (Hawl i Brynu) (Blaenoriaeth Arwystlon) (Cymru) 2005 (S.I. 2005 Rhif 1351 (Cy.99))
- The Rights of Re-entry and Forfeiture (Prescribed Sum and Period) (Wales) Regulations 2005 (S.I. 2005 No. 1352 (W.100))
- Rheoliadau Hawliau Ailfynediad a Fforffediad (Swm a Chyfnod Rhagnodedig) (Cymru) 2005 (S.I. 2005 Rhif 1352 (Cy.100))
- The Commonhold and Leasehold Reform Act 2002 (Commencement No. 3 and Saving and Transitional Provision) (Wales) Order 2005 (S.I. 2005 No. 1353 (W.101) (C.59))
- Gorchymyn Deddf Cyfunddaliad a Diwygio Cyfraith Lesddaliad 2002 (Cychwyn Rhif 3 ac Arbediad a Darpariaeth Drosiannol) (Cymru) 2005 (S.I. 2005 Rhif 1353 (Cy.101) (C.59))
- The Leasehold Houses (Notice of Insurance Cover) (Wales) Regulations 2005 (S.I. 2005 No. 1354 (W.102))
- Rheoliadau Tai Lesddaliad (Hysbysiad o Warchodaeth Yswiriant) (Cymru) 2005 (S.I. 2005 Rhif 1354 (Cy.102))
- The Landlord and Tenant (Notice of Rent) (Wales) Regulations 2005 (S.I. 2005 No. 1355 (W.103))
- Rheoliadau Landlord a Thenant (Hysbysu o Rent) (Cymru) 2005 (S.I. 2005 Rhif 1355 (Cy.103))
- The Leasehold Valuation Tribunals (Procedure) (Amendment) (Wales) Regulations 2005 (S.I. 2005 No. 1356 (W.104))
- Rheoliadau Tribiwnlysoedd Prisio Lesddaliadau (Gweithdrefn) (Diwygio) (Cymru) 2005 (S.I. 2005 Rhif 1356 (Cy.104))
- The Service Charges (Consultation Requirements) (Amendment) (Wales) Regulations 2005 (S.I. 2005 No. 1357 (W.105))
- Rheoliadau Taliadau Gwasanaeth (Gofynion Ymgynghori ) (Diwygio) (Cymru) 2005 (S.I. 2005 Rhif 1357 (Cy.105))
- The Emmaus Catholic & CoE Primary School (Designation as having a Religious Character) Order 2005 (S.I. 2005 No. 1367)
- The St. Herbert's CE VA Primary School (Designation as having a Religious Character) Order 2005 (S.I. 2005 No. 1371)
- The Wireless Telegraphy (Licence Charges) Regulations 2005 (S.I. 2005 No. 1378)
- The Displaced Persons (Temporary Protection) Regulations 2005 (S.I. 2005 No. 1379)
- The Home-Grown Cereals Authority (Rate of Levy) Order 2005 (S.I. 2005 No. 1380)
- The Education (Listed Bodies) (England) (Amendment) Order 2005 (S.I. 2005 No. 1382)
- The Road Traffic (Permitted Parking Area and Special Parking Area) (Metropolitan Borough of Doncaster) Order 2005 (S.I. 2005 No. 1383)
- The Road Traffic (Permitted Parking Area and Special Parking Area) (Metropolitan Borough of Rotherham) Order 2005 (S.I. 2005 No. 1384)
- The Road Traffic (Permitted Parking Area and Special Parking Area) (Metropolitan Borough of Barnsley) Order 2005 (S.I. 2005 No. 1385)
- The Education (Outturn Statements) (England) Regulations 2005 (S.I. 2005 No. 1386)
- The Greenhouse Gas Emissions Trading Scheme (Approved National Allocation Plan) Regulations 2005 (S.I. 2005 No. 1387)
- The Unfitness to Stand Trial and Insanity (Royal Air Force) Regulations 2005 (S.I. 2005 No. 1388)
- The Unfitness to Stand Trial and Insanity (Royal Navy) Regulations 2005 (S.I. 2005 No. 1389)
- The Unfitness to Stand Trial and Insanity (Army) Regulations 2005 (S.I. 2005 No. 1390)
- The A6514 Trunk Road (A52 to A60) (Detrunking) Order 2003 (Revocation) Order 2005 (S.I. 2005 No. 1391)
- The TSE (Wales) (Amendment) Regulations 2005 (S.I. 2005 No. 1392 (W.106))
- Rheoliadau TSE (Cymru) (Diwygio) 2005 (S.I. 2005 Rhif 1392 (Cy.106))
- The Feeding Stuffs (Establishments and Intermediaries) (Amendment) (Wales) Regulations 2005 (S.I. 2005 No. 1393 (W.107))
- Rheoliadau Bwydydd Anifeiliaid (Sefydliadau a Chyfryngwyr) (Diwygio) (Cymru) 2005 (S.I. 2005 Rhif 1393 (Cy.107))
- The National Curriculum (Key Stage 3 Assessment Arrangements) (Wales) Order 2005 (S.I. 2005 No. 1394 (W.108))
- Gorchymyn y Cwricwlwm Cenedlaethol (Trefniadau Asesu Cyfnod Allweddol 3) (Cymru) 2005 (S.I. 2005 Rhif 1394 (Cy.108))
- The Education Act 2002 (Commencement No. 6 and Transitional Provisions) (Wales) Order 2005 (S.I. 2005 No. 1395 (W.109) (C.60))
- Gorchymyn Deddf Addysg 2002 (Cychwyn Rhif 6 a Darpariaethau Trosiannol) (Cymru) 2005 (S.I. 2005 Rhif 1395 (Cy.109) (C.60))
- The National Curriculum Assessment Arrangements (Miscellaneous Amendments) (Wales) Regulations 2005 (S.I. 2005 No. 1396 (W.110))
- Rheoliadau Trefniadau Asesu y Cwricwlwm Cenedlaethol (Diwygiadau Amrywiol) (Cymru) 2005 (S.I. 2005 Rhif 1396 (Cy.110))
- The Production of Bovine Collagen Intended for Human Consumption in the United Kingdom (Wales) Regulations 2005 (S.I. 2005 No. 1397 (W.111))
- Rheoliadau Cynhyrchu Colagen Buchol y Bwriedir i Bobl ei Fwyta yn y Deyrnas Unedig (Cymru) 2005 (S.I. 2005 Rhif 1397 (Cy.111))
- The Education (Admission Appeals Arrangements) (Wales) Regulations 2005 (S.I. 2005 No. 1398 (W.112))
- Rheoliadau Addysg (Trefniadau Apelau Derbyn) (Cymru) 2005 (S.I. 2005 Rhif 1398 (Cy.112))
- The Environmental Impact Assessment (Land Drainage Improvement Works) (Amendment) Regulations 2005 (S.I. 2005 No. 1399)
- The Calshot Oyster Fishery Order 2005 (S.I. 2005 No. 1400)

== 1401–1500 ==
- The Textile Products (Indications of Fibre Content) (Amendment) Regulations 2005 (S.I. 2005 No. 1401)
- The Stanswood Bay Oyster Fishery Order 2005 (S.I. 2005 No. 1402)
- The Public Service Vehicles (Conditions of Fitness, Equipment, Use and Certification) (Amendment) Regulations 2005 (S.I. 2005 No. 1403)
- The Rail Vehicle Accessibility (Heathrow Express Class 360/2) Exemption (Amendment) Order 2005 (S.I. 2005 No. 1404)
- The Environmental Impact Assessment (Uncultivated Land and Semi-natural Areas) (England) (Amendment) Regulations 2005 (S.I. 2005 No. 1430)
- The Constitutional Reform Act 2005 (Commencement No. 1) Order 2005 (S.I. 2005 No. 1431 (C. 61))
- The Inquiries Act 2005 (Commencement) Order 2005 (S.I. 2005 No. 1432 (C.62))
- The Prospectus Regulations 2005 (S.I. 2005 No. 1433)
- The Ship and Port Facility (Security) (Amendment) Regulations 2005 (S.I. 2005 No. 1434)
- The Plant Protection Products Regulations 2005 (S.I. 2005 No. 1435)
- The Pensions Act 2004 (Commencement No. 5) Order 2005 (S.I. 2005 No. 1436 (C.63))
- The Education (Pupil Information) (England) Regulations 2005 (S.I. 2005 No. 1437)
- The Road Traffic (Permitted Parking Area and Special Parking Area) (Borough of Hartlepool) Order 2005 (S.I. 2005 No. 1438)
- The Police Pensions (Part-time Service) Regulations 2005 (S.I. 2005 No. 1439)
- The Pension Protection Fund (Pension Protection Levies Consultation) Regulations 2005 (S.I. 2005 No. 1440)
- The Reporting of Prices of Milk Products (England) Regulations 2005 (S.I. 2005 No. 1441)
- The Food (Chilli, Chilli Products, Curcuma and Palm Oil) (Emergency Control) (England) Regulations 2005 (S.I. 2005 No. 1442)
- The Railways Act 2005 (Commencement No. 1) Order 2005 (S.I. 2005 No. 1444 (C.64))
- The National Health Service Litigation Authority (Establishment and Constitution) Amendment (No. 2) Order 2005 (S.I. 2005 No. 1445)
- The NHS Institute for Innovation and Improvement (Establishment and Constitution) Order 2005 (S.I. 2005 No. 1446)
- The NHS Institute for Innovation and Improvement Regulations 2005 (S.I. 2005 No. 1447)
- The Pollution Prevention and Control (Public Participation)(England and Wales) Regulations 2005 (S.I. 2005 No. 1448)
- The Tonnage Tax (Further Opportunity for Election) Order 2005 (S.I. 2005 No. 1449)
- The Housing Act 2004 (Commencement No.3) (England) Order 2005 (S.I. 2005 No. 1451 (C.65))
- The Law Reform (Miscellaneous Provisions) (Northern Ireland) Order 2005 (S.I. 2005 No. 1452 (N.I. 7))
- The Drainage (Amendment) (Northern Ireland) Order 2005 (S.I. 2005 No. 1453 (N.I. 8))
- The Company Directors Disqualification (Amendment) (Northern Ireland) Order 2005 (S.I. 2005 No. 1454 (N.I. 9))
- The Insolvency (Northern Ireland) Order 2005 (S.I. 2005 No. 1455 (N.I. 10))
- The G8 Gleneagles (Immunities and Privileges) Order 2005 (S.I. 2005 No. 1456)
- The Tax Information Exchange Agreement (Taxes on Income) (Virgin Islands) Order 2005 (S.I. 2005 No. 1457)
- The Tax Information Exchange Agreement (Taxes on Income) (Aruba) Order 2005 (S.I. 2005 No. 1458)
- The Tax Information Exchange Agreement (Taxes on Income) (Montserrat) Order 2005 (S.I. 2005 No. 1459)
- The Tax Information Exchange Agreement (Taxes on Income) (Netherlands Antilles) Order 2005 (S.I. 2005 No. 1460)
- The Democratic Republic of the Congo (United Nations Sanctions) (Overseas Territories) Order 2005 (S.I. 2005 No. 1461)
- The Sudan (United Nations Measures) (Channel Islands) Order 2005 (S.I. 2005 No. 1462)
- The Sudan (United Nations Measures) (Isle of Man) Order 2005 (S.I. 2005 No. 1463)
- The European Convention on Cinematographic Co-production (Amendment) (No.2) Order 2005 (S.I. 2005 No. 1464)
- The Consular Fees Order 2005 (S.I. 2005 No. 1465)
- The Montserrat Reporting of Savings Income Information Order 2005 (S.I. 2005 No. 1466)
- The Scottish Administration (Offices) Order 2005 (S.I. 2005 No. 1467)
- The Democratic Republic of the Congo (United Nations Sanctions) (Channel Islands) Order 2005 (S.I. 2005 No. 1468)
- The Democratic Republic of the Congo (United Nations Sanctions) (Isle of Man) Order 2005 (S.I. 2005 No. 1469)
- The Dockyard Port of Portsmouth Order 2005 (S.I. 2005 No. 1470)
- The Naval, Military and Air Forces Etc. (Disablement and Death) Service Pensions (Amendment) (No.2) Order 2005 (S.I. 2005 No. 1471)
- The Opticians Act 1989 (Transitional Provisions) Order 2005 (S.I. 2005 No. 1472)
- The General Optical Council (Continuing Education and Training Rules) Order of Council 2005 (S.I. 2005 No. 1473)
- The General Optical Council (Committee Constitution Rules) Order of Council 2005 (S.I. 2005 No. 1474)
- The General Optical Council (Fitness to Practise Rules) Order of Council 2005 (S.I. 2005 No. 1475)
- The General Optical Council (Injury or Disease of the Eye and Contact Lens (Qualifications)) (Amendment) Rules Order of Council 2005 (S.I. 2005 No. 1476)
- The General Optical Council (Registration Appeals Rules) Order of Council 2005 (S.I. 2005 No. 1477)
- The General Optical Council (Registration Rules) Order of Council 2005 (S.I. 2005 No. 1478)
- The Recovery of Taxes etc. Due in Other Member States (Amendment of Section 134 of the Finance Act 2002) Regulations 2005 (S.I. 2005 No. 1479)
- The Tonnage Tax (Exception of Financial Year 2005) Order 2005 (S.I. 2005 No. 1480)
- The Contact Lens (Specification) and Miscellaneous Amendments Regulations 2005 (S.I. 2005 No. 1481)

== 1501–1600 ==
- The National Health Service (Pharmaceutical Services) (Amendment No. 2) Regulations 2005 (S.I. 2005 No. 1501)
- The Medicines for Human Use (Prescribing) (Miscellaneous Amendments) Order 2005 (S.I. 2005 No. 1507)
- The School Governance (Contracts) (England) Regulations 2005 (S.I. 2005 No. 1508)
- The Residential Property Tribunal (Right to Buy Determinations) Procedure (England) Regulations 2005 (S.I. 2005 No. 1509)
- The National Assembly for Wales (Social Services Explanations) Regulations 2005 (S.I. 2005 No. 1510 (W.114))
- Rheoliadau Cynulliad Cenedlaethol Cymru (Esboniadau ynghylch Gwasanaethau Cymdeithasol) 2005 (S.I. 2005 Rhif 1510 (Cy.114))
- Education (Disapplication of the National Curriculum at Key Stage 1) (Wales) Regulations 2005 (S.I. 2005 No. 1511 (W.115))
- Rheoliadau Addysg (Datgymhwyso'r Cwricwlwm Cenedlaethol yng Nghyfnod Allweddol 1) (Cymru) 2005 (S.I. 2005 Rhif 1511 (Cy.115))
- The Adoption Support Services (Local Authorities) (Wales) Regulations 2005 (S.I. 2005 No. 1512 (W.116))
- Rheoliadau Gwasanaethau Cymorth Mabwysiadu (Awdurdodau Lleol) (Cymru) 2005 (S.I. 2005 Rhif 1512 (Cy.116))
- The Special Guardianship (Wales) Regulations 2005 (S.I. 2005 No. 1513 (W.117))
- Rheoliadau Gwarcheidiaeth Arbennig (Cymru) 2005 (S.I. 2005 Rhif 1513 (Cy.117))
- The Adoption Support Agencies (Wales) Regulations 2005 (S.I. 2005 No. 1514 (W.118))
- Rheoliadau Asiantaethau Cymorth Mabwysiadu (Cymru) 2005 (S.I. 2005 Rhif 1514 (Cy.118))
- The Re-use of Public Sector Information Regulations 2005 (S.I. 2005 No. 1515)
- The Insolvent Partnerships (Amendment) Order 2005 (S.I. 2005 No. 1516)
- The Democratic Republic of the Congo (United Nations Measures) Order 2005 (S.I. 2005 No. 1517)
- The Financial Services and Markets Act 2000 (Regulated Activities) (Amendment) (No.2) Order 2005 (S.I. 2005 No. 1518)
- The Public Lending Right Scheme 1982 (Commencement of Variations) Order 2005 (S.I. 2005 No. 1519)
- The Medicines (Sale or Supply) (Miscellaneous Amendments) Regulations 2005 (S.I. 2005 No. 1520)
- The Serious Organised Crime and Police Act 2005 (Commencement No. 1, Transitional and Transitory Provisions) Order 2005 (S.I. 2005 No. 1521 (C. 66))
- The Royal Parks (Regulation of Specified Parks) Order 2005 (S.I. 2005 No. 1522)
- The Finance Act 1995 (Denatured Alcohol) (Appointed Day and Savings) Order 2005 (S.I. 2005 No. 1523 (C. 67))
- The Denatured Alcohol Regulations 2005 (S.I. 2005 No. 1524)
- The Terrorism (United Nations Measures) Order 2001 (Amendment) Regulations 2005 (S.I. 2005 No. 1525)
- Burma (Financial Sanctions) Regulations 2005 (S.I. 2005 No. 1526)
- The International Criminal Tribunal for the Former Yugoslavia (Financial Sanctions Against Indictees) Regulations 2005 (S.I. 2005 No. 1527)
- The Waste Management Licensing (England and Wales)(Amendment and Related Provisions)(No. 2) Regulations 2005 (S.I. 2005 No. 1528)
- The Financial Services and Markets Act 2000 (Financial Promotion) Order 2005 (S.I. 2005 No. 1529)
- The Home Energy Efficiency Scheme (England) Regulations 2005 (S.I. 2005 No. 1530)
- The Financial Services and Markets Act 2000 (Promotion of Collective Investment Schemes) (Exemptions) (Amendment) Order 2005 (S.I. 2005 No. 1532)
- The Children (Private Arrangements for Fostering) Regulations 2005 (S.I. 2005 No. 1533)
- The Standing Civilian Courts (Amendment) Order 2005 (S.I. 2005 No. 1534)
- The Courts-Martial (Amendment) Rules 2005 (S.I. 2005 No. 1535)
- The Summary Appeal Courts (Amendment) Rules 2005 (S.I. 2005 No. 1536)
- The Serious Organised Crime and Police Act 2005 (Designated Area) Order 2005 (S.I. 2005 No. 1537)
- The Lloyd's Sourcebook (Amendment of the Finance Act 1993 and the Finance Act 1994) Order 2005 (S.I. 2005 No. 1538)
- The Reporting of Savings Income Information (Amendment) Regulations 2005 (S.I. 2005 No. 1539)
- The Food (Chilli, Chilli Products, Curcuma and Palm Oil) (Emergency Control) (Wales) Regulations 2005 (S.I. 2005 No. 1540 (W.119 ))
- Regulatory Reform (Fire Safety) Order 2005 (S.I. 2005 No. 1541)
- The Education (London Residuary Body) (Property Transfer) (Amendment) Order 2005 (S.I. 2005 No. 1542)
- The Social Security (Shared Additional Pension) (Miscellaneous Amendments) Regulations 2005 (S.I. 2005 No. 1551)
- The North Northamptonshire Joint Committee Order 2005 (S.I. 2005 No. 1552)
- The A40 Trunk Road (M5 Motorway Junction 11 to the Gloucestershire/Oxfordshire County Boundary) (Detrunking) Order 2005 (S.I. 2005 No. 1574)
- The Wireless Telegraphy (Automotive Short Range Radar) (Exemption) (No. 2) Regulations 2005 (S.I. 2005 No. 1585)
- The Pilgrim Church of England Primary School (Designation as having a Religious Character) Order 2005 (S.I. 2005 No. 1586)

== 1601–1700 ==
- The Our Lady of Walsingham Catholic Primary School (Designation as having a Religious Character) Order 2005 (S.I. 2005 No. 1604)
- The Registration of Fish Buyers and Sellers and Designation of Fish Auction Sites Regulations 2005 (S.I. 2005 No. 1605)
- The Road Traffic Act 1988 (Retention and Disposal of Seized Motor Vehicles) Regulations 2005 (S.I. 2005 No. 1606)
- The Yorkshire Regional Flood Defence Committee Order 2005 (S.I. 2005 No. 1607)
- The St Francis of Assisi RC Primary School (Designation as having a Religious Character) Order 2005 (S.I. 2005 No. 1608)
- The St John's Church of England First and Middle School (Designation as having a Religious Character) Order 2005 (S.I. 2005 No. 1609)
- The Pension Protection Fund (Payments to meet Investment Costs) Regulations 2005 (S.I. 2005 No. 1610)
- The Health and Social Care (Community Health and Standards) Act 2003 (Public Health Laboratory Service Board) (Consequential Provisions) Order 2005 (S.I. 2005 No. 1622)
- The Great Clacton Church of England Voluntary Aided Junior School (Designation as having a Religious Character) Order 2005 (S.I. 2005 No. 1623)
- The St Nicholas CofE Primary School (Designation as having a Religious Character) Order 2005 (S.I. 2005 No. 1624)
- The Health Professions Council (Practice Committees and Registration) (Amendment) Rules Order of Council 2005 (S.I. 2005 No. 1625)
- The Colours in Food (Amendment) (Wales) Regulations 2005 (S.I. 2005 No. 1628 (W.122))
- Rheoliadau Lliwiau mewn Bwyd (Diwygio) (Cymru) 2005 (S.I. 2005 Rhif 1628 (Cy.122))
- The Contaminants in Food (Wales) (Amendment) Regulations 2005 (S.I. 2005 No. 1629 (W.123))
- Rheoliadau Halogion mewn Bwyd (Cymru) (Diwygio) 2005 (S.I. 2005 Rhif 1629 (Cy.123))
- The National Health Service (Optical Charges and Payments) and (General Ophthalmic Services) (Amendment) (Wales) Regulations 2005 (S.I. 2005 No. 1630 (W.124))
- Rheoliadau'r Gwasanaeth Iechyd Gwladol (Ffioedd a Thaliadau Optegol) a (Gwasanaethau Offthalmig Cyffredinol) (Diwygio) (Cymru) 2005 (S.I. 2005 Rhif 1630 (Cy.124))
- The Stamp Duty (Consequential Amendment of Enactments) (Northern Ireland) Regulations 2005 (S.I. 2005 No. 1634)
- The Home Loss Payments (Prescribed Amounts)(England) Regulations 2005 (S.I. 2005 No. 1635)
- The Water Supply Licence (Application) Regulations 2005 (S.I. 2005 No. 1638)
- The Personal Injuries (Civilians) (Amendment) (No.2) Scheme 2005 (S.I. 2005 No. 1639)
- The Landfill (England and Wales) (Amendment) Regulations 2005 (S.I. 2005 No. 1640)
- The Road Vehicles (Construction and Use) (Amendment) Regulations 2005 (S.I. 2005 No. 1641)
- The Control of Noise at Work Regulations 2005 (S.I. 2005 No.1643)
- The Financial Services and Markets Act 2000 (Administration Orders Relating to Insurers) (Northern Ireland) Order 2005 (S.I. 2005 No. 1644)
- The Road Traffic (Permitted Parking Area and Special Parking Area) (County of Surrey) (Borough of Woking) Order 2005 (S.I. 2005 No. 1645)
- The Electricity and Gas Appeals (Designation and Exclusion) Order 2005 (S.I. 2005 No. 1646)
- The Materials and Articles in Contact with Food (Wales) Regulations 2005 (S.I. 2005 No. 1647 (W.128))
- Rheoliadau Deunyddiau ac Eitemau mewn Cysylltiad â Bwyd (Cymru) 2005 (S.I. 2005 Rhif 1647 (Cy.128))
- The Education (Listed Bodies) (Wales) (Amendment) Order 2005 (S.I. 2005 No. 1648 (W.129))
- Gorchymyn Addysg (Cyrff sy'n Cael eu Rhestru) (Cymru) (Diwygio) 2005 (S.I. 2005 Rhif 1648 (Cy.129))
- The Plastic Materials and Articles in Contact with Food (Amendment) (No. 2) (Wales) Regulations 2005 (S.I. 2005 No. 1649 (W.130))
- Rheoliadau Deunyddiau ac Eitemau Plastig mewn Cysylltiad â Bwyd (Diwygio) (Rhif 2) (Cymru) 2005 (S.I. 2005 Rhif 1649 (Cy.130))
- The Drugs Act 2005 (Commencement No. 1) Order 2005 (S.I. 2005 No. 1650 (C. 68))
- The Misuse of Drugs (Designation) (Amendment) Order 2005 (S.I. 2005 No. 1652)
- The Misuse of Drugs (Amendment) (No. 2) Regulations 2005 (S.I. 2005 No. 1653)
- The Nuclear Industries Security (Fees) Regulations 2005 (S.I. 2005 No. 1654)
- The Offshore Installations (Safety Zones) Order 2005 (S.I. 2005 No. 1656)
- The Surrey and Borders Partnership National Health Service Trust (Transfer of Trust Property) Order 2005 (S.I. 2005 No. 1669)
- The Traffic Signs (Amendment) Regulations and General Directions 2005 (S.I. 2005 No. 1670)
- The M42 (Junctions 3A to 7) (Actively Managed Hard Shoulder and Variable Speed Limits) Regulations 2005 (S.I. 2005 No. 1671)
- The Driver and Vehicle Licensing Agency Trading Fund (Variation) Order 2005 (S.I. 2005 No. 1672)
- The List of Wastes (England) (Amendment) Regulations 2005 (S.I. 2005 No. 1673)
- The Control of Trade in Endangered Species (Enforcement) (Amendment) Regulations 2005 (S.I. 2005 No. 1674)
- The Clean Neighbourhoods and Environment Act 2005 (Commencement No. 1) Order 2005 (S.I. 2005 No. 1675 (C.69))
- The Disability Discrimination Act 2005 (Commencement No. 1) Order 2005 (S.I. 2005 No. 1676 (C.70))
- The Export Control (Democratic Republic of Congo) Order 2005 (S.I. 2005 No. 1677)

== 1701–1800 ==
- The Domestic Violence, Crime and Victims Act 2004 (Commencement No. 2) Order 2005 (S.I. 2005 No. 1705 (C.71))
- The Kent Institute of Art and Design Higher Education Corporation (Dissolution) Order 2005 (S.I. 2005 No. 1708)
- The Recovery of Duties and Taxes Etc. Due in Other Member States (Corresponding UK Claims, Procedure and Supplementary) (Amendment) Regulations 2005 (S.I. 2005 No. 1709)
- The Medicines (Provision of False or Misleading Information and Miscellaneous Amendments) Regulations 2005 (S.I. 2005 No. 1710)
- The Restriction on the Preparation of Adoption Reports Regulations 2005 (S.I. 2005 No. 1711)
- The Suitability of Adopters Regulations 2005 (S.I. 2005 No. 1712)
- The Finance Act 2003, sections 189 and 190, (Appointed Day) Order 2005 (S.I. 2005 No. 1713 (C.72))
- The Climate Change Levy (Combined Heat and Power Stations) Regulations 2005 (S.I. 2005 No. 1714)
- The Climate Change Levy (Fuel Use and Recycling Processes) Regulations 2005 (S.I. 2005 No. 1715)
- The Climate Change Levy (Miscellaneous Amendments) Regulations 2005 (S.I. 2005 No. 1716)
- The Scallop Fishing (Wales) Order 2005 (S.I. 2005 No. 1717 (W.132))
- Gorchymyn Pysgota am Gregyn Bylchog (Cymru) 2005 (S.I. 2005 Rhif 1717 (Cy.132))
- The Education (Student Loans) (Amendment) (England and Wales) Regulations 2005 (S.I. 2005 No. 1718)
- The Housing Benefit (General) (Amendment) Regulations 2005 (S.I. 2005 No. 1719)
- The Pensions Act 2004 (Commencement No. 6, Transitional Provisions and Savings) Order 2005 (S.I. 2005 No. 1720 (C.73))
- The Street Works (Sharing of Costs of Works) (Wales) Regulations 2005 (S.I. 2005 No. 1721 (W.133))
- Rheoliadau Gwaith Stryd (Rhannu Costau Gwaith) (Cymru) 2005 (S.I. 2005 Rhif 1721 (Cy.133))
- The Individual Learning Accounts Wales (Amendment) Regulations 2005 (S.I. 2005 No. 1722 (W.134))
- Rheoliadau Cyfrifon Dysgu Unigol Cymru (Diwygio) 2005 (S.I. 2005 Rhif 1722 (Cy.134))
- The National Health Service (Travelling Expenses and Remission of Charges) (Amendment) (Wales) Regulations 2005 (S.I. 2005 No. 1723 (W.135))
- Rheoliadau'r Gwasanaeth Iechyd Gwladol (Treuliau Teithio a Pheidio â Chodi Tâl) (Diwygio) (Cymru) 2005 (S.I. 2005 Rhif 1723 (Cy.135))
- The Value Added Tax (Disclosure of Avoidance Schemes) (Designations) (Amendment) Order 2005 (S.I. 2005 No. 1724)
- The Pesticides (Maximum Residue Levels in Crops, Food and Feeding Stuffs) (England and Wales) (Amendment) (No. 2) Regulations 2005 (S.I. 2005 No. 1725)
- The Energy Information (Household Air Conditioners) (No. 2) Regulations 2005 (S.I. 2005 No. 1726)
- The Gaming Duty (Amendment) Regulations 2005 (S.I. 2005 No. 1727)
- The Waste Management Licensing (England and Wales)(Amendment and Related Provisions)(No. 3) Regulations 2005 (S.I. 2005 No. 1728)
- The Housing Act 2004 (Commencement No. 4 and Transitional Provisions)(England) Order 2005 (S.I. 2005 No. 1729 (C.74))
- The School Governance (Constitution, Federations and New Schools) (England) (Amendment) Regulations 2005 (S.I. 2005 No. 1730)
- The Education (Change of Category of Maintained Schools) (Amendment) (England) Regulations 2005 (S.I. 2005 No. 1731)
- The Carriage of Dangerous Goods and Use of Transportable Pressure Equipment (Amendment) Regulations 2005 (S.I. 2005 No. 1732)
- The Airports Licensing (Liquor) Order 2005 (S.I. 2005 No. 1733)
- The Housing (Right to Buy)(Information to Secure Tenants)(England) Order 2005 (S.I. 2005 No. 1735)
- The Housing (Right to Buy) (Prescribed Forms) (Amendment) (England) (No.2) Regulations 2005 (S.I. 2005 No. 1736)
- The Railways (Rail Passengers' Council and Rail Passengers' Committees) (Exemptions) (Amendment) Order 2005 (S.I. 2005 No. 1737)
- The Railways Act 2005 (Transitional Provisions and Savings) Order 2005 (S.I. 2005 No. 1738)
- The Coventry City Council and the North West Federation of Schools (International General Certificate of Secondary Education) Order 2005 (S.I. 2005 No. 1739)
- The Education (Induction Arrangements for School Teachers) (Consolidation) (England) (Amendment) Regulations 2005 (S.I. 2005 No. 1740)
- The Employment Zones (Amendment) Regulations 2005 (S.I. 2005 No. 1744)
- The Safety of Sports Grounds (Designation) Order 2005 (S.I. 2005 No. 1748)
- The Football Spectators (Seating) Order 2005 (S.I. 2005 No. 1751)
- The Land Registration (Proper Office) (Amendment) Order 2005 (S.I. 2005 No. 1765)
- The Land Registration (Amendment) Rules 2005 (S.I. 2005 No. 1766)
- The NHSU Abolition Order 2005 (S.I. 2005 No. 1781)
- The Community Interest Company Regulations 2005 (S.I. 2005 No. 1788)
- The Crime and Disorder Act 1998 (Responsible Authorities) Order 2005 (S.I. 2005 No. 1789)
- The Adults with Incapacity (Scotland) Act 2000 (Consequential Modifications) (England, Wales and Northern Ireland) Order 2005 (S.I. 2005 No. 1790 (S.5))
- The Education (Additional Support for Learning) (Scotland) Act 2004 (Consequential Modifications) Order 2005 (S.I. 2005 No. 1791 (S.6))
- The Education (Leeds College of Music) (Transfer to the Higher Education Sector) Order 2005 (S.I. 2005 No. 1792)
- The Community Legal Service (Financial) (Amendment No.3) Regulations 2005 (S.I. 2005 No. 1793)
- The Midland Metro (Birmingham City Centre Extension, etc.) Order 2005 (S.I. 2005 No. 1794)

== 1801–1900 ==
- The Education (School Organisation Proposals) (England) (Amendment) Regulations 2005 (S.I. 2005 No. 1801)
- The Civil Legal Aid (General) (Amendment No. 2) Regulations 2005 (S.I. 2005 No. 1802)
- General Product Safety Regulations 2005 (S.I. 2005 No. 1803)
- The Financial Assistance for Environmental Purposes Order 2005 (S.I. 2005 No. 1805)
- The Hazardous Waste (Wales) Regulations 2005 (S.I. 2005 No. 1806 (W.138))
- Rheoliadau Gwastraff Peryglus (Cymru) 2005 (S.I. 2005 Rhif 1806 (Cy.138))
- The Social Security (Students and Income-related Benefits) Amendment Regulations 2005 (S.I. 2005 No. 1807)
- The Home Loss Payments (Prescribed Amounts) (Wales) Regulations 2005 (S.I. 2005 No. 1808 (W.139))
- Rheoliadau Taliadau Colli Cartref (Symiau Rhagnodedig) (Cymru) 2005 (S.I. 2005 Rhif 1808 (Cy.139))
- The Highways (Schools) (Special Extinguishment and Special Diversion Orders) (Wales) Regulations 2005 (S.I. 2005 No. 1809 (W.140))
- Rheoliadau Priffyrdd (Ysgolion) (Gorchmynion Dileu Arbennig a Gwyro Arbennig) (Cymru) 2005 (S.I. 2005 Rhif 1809 (Cy.140))
- The Street Works (Recovery of Costs) (Wales) Regulations 2005 (S.I. 2005 No. 1810 (W.141))
- Rheoliadau Gwaith Stryd (Adennill Costau) (Cymru) 2005 (S.I. 2005 Rhif 1810 (Cy.141))
- The Fees for Assessment of Active Substances (Fourth Stage Review) Regulations 2005 (S.I. 2005 No. 1811)
- Street Works (Records) (Wales) Regulations 2005 (S.I. 2005 No. 1812 (W.142))
- Rheoliadau Gwaith Stryd (Cofnodion) (Cymru) 2005 (S.I. 2005 Rhif 1812 (Cy.142))
- The Education (Nursery Education and Early Years Development and Childcare Plans) (Wales) (Amendment) Regulations 2005 (S.I. 2005 No. 1813 (W.143))
- Rheoliadau Addysg (Addysg Feithrin a Chynlluniau Datblygu Blynyddoedd Cynnar a Gofal Plant) (Cymru) (Diwygio) 2005 (S.I. 2005 Rhif 1813 (Cy.143))
- The Housing Act 2004 (Commencement No. 1) (Wales) Order 2005 (S.I. 2005 No. 1814 (W.144) (C.75))
- Gorchymyn Deddf Tai 2004 (Cychwyn Rhif 1) (Cymru) 2005 (S.I. 2005 Rhif 1814 (Cy.144) (C.75))
- The Cosmetic Products (Safety) (Amendment) Regulations 2005 (S.I. 2005 No. 1815)
- The Social Housing Ombudsman (Wales) Regulations 2005 (S.I. 2005 No. 1816 (W.145))
- Rheoliadau Ombwdsmon Tai Cymdeithasol (Cymru) 2005 (S.I. 2005 Rhif 1816 (Cy.145))
- The Criminal Justice Act 2003 (Commencement No. 10 and Saving Provisions) Order 2005 (S.I. 2005 No. 1817 (C.76))
- The Education (Induction Arrangements for School Teachers) (Wales) Regulations 2005 (S.I. 2005 No. 1818 (W.146))
- Rheoliadau Addysg (Trefniadau Ymsefydlu ar gyfer Athrawon Ysgol) (Cymru) 2005 (S.I. 2005 Rhif 1818 (Cy.146))
- The Independent Review of Determinations (Adoption) (Wales) Regulations 2005 (S.I. 2005 No. 1819 (W.147))
- Rheoliadau Adolygu Dyfarniadau'n Annibynnol (Mabwysiadu) (Cymru) 2005 (S.I. 2005 Rhif 1819 (Cy.147))
- The List of Wastes (Wales) Regulations 2005 (S.I. 2005 No. 1820 (W.148))
- Rheoliadau'r Rhestr Wastraffoedd (Cymru) 2005 (S.I. 2005 Rhif 1820 (Cy.148))
- The Domestic Violence, Crime and Victims Act 2004 (Commencement No. 3) Order 2005 (S.I. 2005 No. 1821 (C. 77))
- The Olympic Lotteries (Declaration that London is to host the 2012 Olympic Games) Order 2005 (S.I. 2005 No. 1830)
- The Horserace Betting and Olympic Lottery Act 2004 (Commencement No. 3) Order 2005 (S.I. 2005 No. 1831 (C.78))
- The Motor Vehicles (Tests) (Amendment) Regulations 2005 (S.I. 2005 No. 1832)
- The Higher Education Act 2004 (Commencement No.2 and Transitional Provision) (Wales) Order 2005 (S.I. 2005 No. 1833 (W.149) (C.79))
- Gorchymyn Deddf Addysg Uwch 2004 (Cychwyn Rhif 2 a Darpariaeth Drosiannol) (Cymru) 2005 (S.I. 2005 Rhif 1833 (Cy.149) (C.79))
- The Fees in Higher Education Institutions (Wales) Regulations 2005 (S.I. 2005 No. 1860 (W.152))
- Rheoliadau Ffioedd mewn Sefydliadau Addysg Uwch (Cymru) 2005 (S.I. 2005 Rhif 1860 (Cy.152))
- The St Leonard's (CofE) Primary School (Designation as having a Religious Character) Order 2005 (S.I. 2005 No. 1861)
- The St Mary's & St John's C of E Primary School (Designation as having a Religious Character) Order 2005 (S.I. 2005 No. 1862)
- The Ruth Lunzer Lubavitch Jewish Girls Primary School (Designation as having a Religious Character) Order 2005 (S.I. 2005 No. 1863)
- The Bishops' College (Designation as having a Religious Character) Order 2005 (S.I. 2005 No. 1864)
- The Employment Tribunals (Constitution and Rules of Procedure) (Amendment) (No. 2) Regulations 2005 (S.I. 2005 No. 1865)
- The Transport for London (Waterloo Station) Order 2005 (S.I. 2005 No. 1866)
- The Derbyshire County Council (Erewash Canal Bridge) Scheme 2003 Confirmation Instrument 2005 (S.I. 2005No 1867)
- The Stamp Duty Land Tax Avoidance Schemes (Prescribed Descriptions of Arrangements) Regulations 2005 (S.I. 2005 No. 1868)
- The Tax Avoidance Schemes (Information) (Amendment) Regulations 2005 (S.I. 2005 No. 1869)
- The International Organisations Act 2005 (Commencement) Order 2005 (S.I. 2005 No. 1870 (C.80))
- The Employment Appeal Tribunal (Amendment) Rules 2005 (S.I. 2005 No. 1871)
- The Postgraduate Medical Education and Training Board (Fees) Rules Order 2005 (S.I. 2005 No. 1872)

== 1901–2000 ==
- The Countryside and Rights of Way Act 2000 (Commencement No. 8) Order 2005 (S.I. 2005 No. 1901 (C.81))
- The Motor Cars (Driving Instruction) Regulations 2005 (S.I. 2005 No. 1902)
- The Local Government Pension Scheme (Amendment) Regulations 2005 (S.I. 2005 No. 1903)
- The Passenger and Goods Vehicles (Recording Equipment) Regulations 2005 (S.I. 2005 No. 1904)
- The Drought Plan Regulations 2005 (S.I. 2005 No. 1905)
- The Regulatory Reform (Execution of Deeds and Documents) Order 2005 (S.I. 2005 No. 1906)
- The Pension Protection Fund (Tax) (2005–06) Regulations 2005 (S.I. 2005 No. 1907)
- The Diseases of Animals (Approved Disinfectants) (Amendment) (England) Order 2005 (S.I. 2005 No. 1908)
- The Railways Act 2005 (Commencement No. 2) Order 2005 (S.I. 2005 No. 1909 (C.82))
- The Education (Review of Staffing Structure) (Wales) Regulations 2005 (S.I. 2005 No. 1910 (W.153))
- Rheoliadau Addysg (Adolygu Strwythur Staffio) (Cymru) 2005 (S.I. 2005 Rhif 1910 (Cy.153))
- The Public Audit (Wales) Act 2004 (Commencement No. 3) Order 2005 (S.I. 2005 No. 1911 (W.154) (C.83))
- Gorchymyn Deddf Archwilio Cyhoeddus (Cymru) 2004 (Cychwyn Rhif 3) 2005 (S.I. 2005 Rhif 1911 (Cy.154) (C.83))
- The Genetically Modified Organisms (Transboundary Movement) (Wales) Regulations 2005 (S.I. 2005 No. 1912 (W.155))
- Rheoliadau Organeddau a Addaswyd yn Enetig (Eu Symud ar draws Ffin) (Cymru) 2005 (S.I. 2005 Rhif 1912 (Cy.155))
- The Genetically Modified Organisms (Deliberate Release) (Wales) (Amendment) Regulations 2005 (S.I. 2005 No. 1913 (W.156))
- Rheoliadau Organeddau a Addaswyd yn Enetig (Eu Gollwng yn Fwriadol) (Cymru) (Diwygio) 2005 (S.I. 2005 Rhif 1913 (Cy.156))
- The Genetically Modified Organisms (Traceability and Labelling) (Wales) Regulations 2005 (S.I. 2005 No. 1914 (W.157))
- Rheoliadau Organeddau a Addaswyd yn Enetig (Eu Holrhain a'u Labelu) (Cymru) 2005 (S.I. 2005 Rhif 1914 (Cy.157))
- The National Health Service (Charges for Drugs and Appliances) (Wales) (Amendment)(No. 2) Regulations 2005 (S.I. 2005 No. 1915 (W.158))
- Rheoliadau'r Gwasanaeth Iechyd Gwladol (Ffioedd am Gyffuriau a Chyfarpar) (Cymru) (Diwygio) (Rhif 2) 2005 (S.I. 2005 Rhif 1915 (Cy.158))
- The Merchant Shipping (Prevention of Oil Pollution) (Amendment) Regulations 2005 (S.I. 2005 No. 1916)
- The Housing (Right of First Refusal) (England) Regulations 2005 (S.I. 2005 No. 1917)
- The Greater Manchester (Leigh Busway) Order 2005 (S.I. 2005 No. 1918)
- The Merchant Shipping (Medical Examination) (Amendment) Regulations 2005 (S.I. 2005 No. 1919)
- The Honey (Amendment) (England) Regulations 2005 (S.I. 2005 No. 1920)
- The Occupational Pension Schemes (Equal Treatment) (Amendment) Regulations 2005 (S.I. 2005 No. 1923)
- The European Parliament (United Kingdom Representatives) Pensions (Amendment) Order 2005 (S.I. 2005 No. 1924)
- The Diseases of Poultry Declaratory (Infected Area) (England) Order 2005 (S.I. 2005 No. 1957)
- The National Assembly for Wales (Transfer of Functions) Order 2005 (S.I. 2005 No. 1958)
- The Education (Inspectors of Schools in England) (No. 2) Order 2005 (S.I. 2005 No. 1959)
- The Local Authorities (Armorial Bearings) (Wales) Order 2005 (S.I. 2005 No. 1960)
- The Unauthorised Encampments (Northern Ireland) Order 2005 (S.I. 2005 No. 1961 (N.I. 11))
- The Budget (No. 2) (Northern Ireland) Order 2005 (S.I. 2005 No. 1962 (N.I. 12))
- The Colleges of Education (Northern Ireland) Order 2005 (S.I. 2005 No. 1963 (N.I. 13))
- The Traffic Management (Northern Ireland) Order 2005 (S.I. 2005 No. 1964 (N.I. 14))
- The Criminal Justice (Northern Ireland) Order 2005 (S.I. 2005 No. 1965 (N.I. 15))
- The Firearms (Amendment) (Northern Ireland) Order 2005 (S.I. 2005 No. 1966 (N.I. 16))
- The Companies (Audit, Investigations and Community Enterprise) (Northern Ireland) Order 2005 (S.I. 2005 No. 1967 (N.I. 17))
- The Local Government (Northern Ireland) Order 2005 (S.I. 2005 No. 1968 (N.I. 18))
- The Local Elections (Northern Ireland) (Amendment) Order 2005 (S.I. 2005 No. 1969)
- The Air Navigation Order 2005 (S.I. 2005 No. 1970)
- The European Communities (Designation) (No. 2) Order 2005 (S.I. 2005 No. 1971)
- The Children Act 2004 (Children's Services) Regulations 2005 (S.I. 2005 No. 1972)
- The Children Act 2004 (Joint Area Reviews) Regulations 2005 (S.I. 2005 No. 1973)
- The Protection of Wrecks (Designation) (England) Order 2005 (S.I. 2005 No. 1974)
- The Motor Vehicles (Driving Licences) (Amendment) Regulations 2005 (S.I. 2005 No. 1975)
- The Family Proceedings (Amendment No 4) Rules 2005 (S.I. 2005 No. 1976 (L. 18 ))
- The Family Proceedings Courts (Miscellaneous Amendments) Rules 2005 (S.I. 2005 No. 1977 (L. 19))
- The Excise Duties (Surcharges or Rebates) (Hydrocarbon Oils etc.) Order 2005 (S.I. 2005 No. 1978)
- The Excise Duties (Road Fuel Gas) (Reliefs) Regulations 2005 (S.I. 2005 No. 1979)
- The Air Navigation (General) Regulations 2005 (S.I. 2005 No. 1980)
- The Land Charges (Amendment) Rules 2005 (S.I. 2005 No. 1981)
- The Land Registration (Amendment) (No 2) Rules 2005 (S.I. 2005 No. 1982)
- The Age-Related Payments Regulations 2005 (S.I. 2005 No. 1983)
- The Bank Accounts Directive (Miscellaneous Banks) (Amendment) Regulations 2005 (S.I. 2005 No. 1984)
- The Insurance Accounts Directive (Miscellaneous Insurance Undertakings) (Amendment) Regulations 2005 (S.I. 2005 No. 1985)
- The Financial Assistance Scheme Regulations 2005 (S.I. 2005 No. 1986)
- The Partnerships and Unlimited Companies (Accounts) (Amendment) Regulations 2005 (S.I. 2005 No. 1987)
- The Democratic Republic of the Congo (Restrictive Measures) (Overseas Territories) (Amendment) Order 2005 (S.I. 2005 No. 1988)
- The Limited Liability Partnerships (Amendment) Regulations 2005 (S.I. 2005 No. 1989)
- The Stamp Duty and Stamp Duty Reserve Tax (Extension of Exceptions relating to Recognised Exchanges) Regulations 2005 (S.I. 2005 No. 1990)
- The Railways and Transport Safety Act 2003 (Commencement No. 5) Order 2005 (S.I. 2005 No. 1991 (C. 84))
- The Railways (Accident Investigation and Reporting) Regulations 2005 (S.I. 2005 No. 1992)
- The Value Added Tax (Refund of Tax to Museums and Galleries) (Amendment) Order 2005 (S.I. 2005 No. 1993)
- The Financial Assistance Scheme (Internal Review) Regulations 2005 (S.I. 2005 No. 1994)
- The Housing (Right to Buy)(Designated Rural Areas and Designated Regions) (England) Order 2005 (S.I. 2005 No. 1995)
- The Registration of Civil Partnerships (Fees) Order 2005 (S.I. 2005 No. 1996)
- The Registration of Births, Deaths and Marriages (Fees) (Amendment) Order 2005 (S.I. 2005 No. 1997)
- The Insurers (Reorganisation and Winding Up) (Lloyd's) Regulations 2005 (S.I. 2005 No. 1998)
- The M275 and M27 Motorway (Speed Limit) Regulations 2005 (S.I. 2005 No. 1999)
- The Civil Partnership (Amendments to Registration Provisions) Order 2005 (S.I. 2005 No. 2000)

== 2001–2100 ==
- The Dangerous Substances and Preparations (Nickel) (Safety) Regulations 2005 (S.I. 2005 No. 2001)
- The Animals and Animal Products (Import and Export) (England) Regulations 2005 (S.I. 2005 No. 2002)
- The Environmental Stewardship (England) and Organic Products (Amendment) Regulations 2005 (S.I. 2005 No. 2003)
- The Local Government Pension Scheme and Management and Investment of Funds (Amendment) Regulations 2005 (S.I. 2005 No. 2004)
- The Friendly Societies (Modification of the Corporation Tax Acts) (Amendment) Regulations 2005 (S.I. 2005 No. 2005)
- The Community Legal Service (Cost Protection) (Amendment) Regulations 2005 (S.I. 2005 No. 2006)
- The Finance Act 2002, Section 117 (Day Appointed for Cessation of Effect) Order 2005 (S.I. 2005 No. 2007(C.85))
- The Community Legal Service (Scope) Regulations 2005 (S.I. 2005 No. 2008)
- The Value Added Tax (Disclosure of Avoidance Schemes)(Amendment) Regulations 2005 (S.I. 2005 No. 2009)
- The Finance (No. 2) Act 2005, section 6, (Appointed Day and Savings Provisions) Order 2005 (S.I. 2005 No. 2010 (C.88 ))
- The Dentists Act 1984 (Amendment) Order 2005 (S.I. 2005 No. 2011)
- The Loan Relationships and Derivative Contracts (Disregard and Bringing into Account of Profits and Losses) (Amendment) Regulations 2005 (S.I. 2005 No. 2012)
- The Exchange Gains and Losses (Bringing into Account Gains or Losses) (Amendment) Regulations 2005 (S.I. 2005 No. 2013)
- The Friendly Societies (Modification of the Corporation Tax Acts) Regulations 2005 (S.I. 2005 No. 2014)
- The Veterinary Surgery (Testing for Tuberculosis in Bovines) Order 2005 (S.I. 2005 No. 2015)
- The Parochial Fees Order 2005 (S.I. 2005 No. 2016)
- The Partnerships (Restrictions on Contributions to a Trade) Regulations 2005 (S.I. 2005 No. 2017)
- The Legal Officers (Annual Fees) (No.2) Order 2005 (S.I. 2005 No. 2018)
- The National Minimum Wage Regulations 1999 (Amendment) Regulations 2005 (S.I. 2005 No. 2019)
- The Ecclesiastical Judges, Legal Officers and Others (Fees) Order 2005 (S.I. 2005 No. 2020)
- The Army, Air Force and Naval Discipline Acts (Continuation) Order 2005 (S.I. 2005 No. 2021)
- The Clergy Discipline Rules 2005 (S.I. 2005 No. 2022)
- The Pension Protection Fund (PPF Ombudsman) Amendment Order 2005 (S.I. 2005 No. 2023)
- The Pension Protection Fund (Reference of Reviewable Matters to the PPF Ombudsman) Regulations 2005 (S.I. 2005 No. 2024)
- The Pension Protection Fund (Investigation by PPF Ombudsman of Complaints of Maladministration) Regulations 2005 (S.I. 2005 No. 2025)
- The Serious Organised Crime and Police Act 2005 (Commencement No. 2) Order 2005 (S.I. 2005 No. 2026 (C. 86))
- The Access to the Countryside (Correction of Provisional and Conclusive Maps) (England) (Amendment) Regulations 2005 (S.I. 2005 No. 2027)
- The National Health Service Appointments Commission (Establishment and Constitution) (Amendment) Order 2005 (S.I. 2005 No. 2028)
- The Education (Penalty Notices) (England) (Amendment) Regulations 2005 (S.I. 2005 No. 2029)
- The Education (Assisted Places) (Amendment) (England) Regulations 2005 (S.I. 2005 No. 2030)
- The Council Tax Limitation (England) (Maximum Amounts) Order 2005 (S.I. 2005 No. 2032)
- The Water Supply Licence (Modification of Standard Conditions) Order 2005 (S.I. 2005 No. 2033)
- The Education Act 2005 (Commencement No.1 and Savings and Transitional Provisions) Order 2005 (S.I. 2005 No. 2034(C.87))
- The Water Act 2003 (Consequential and Supplementary Provisions) Regulations 2005 (S.I. 2005 No. 2035)
- The Extradition Act 2003 (Amendment to Designations) (No.2) Order 2005 (S.I. 2005 No. 2036)
- The Education (Assisted Places) (Incidental Expenses) (Amendment) (England) Regulations 2005 (S.I. 2005 No. 2037)
- The Education (School Inspection) (England) Regulations 2005 (S.I. 2005 No. 2038)
- The Education (Pupil Referral Units) (Application of Enactments) (England) Regulations 2005 (S.I. 2005 No. 2039)
- The Civil Contingencies Act 2004 (Commencement No.3) Order 2005 (S.I. 2005 No. 2040 (C.89))
- The Civil Contingencies Act 2004 (Contingency Planning) Regulations 2005 (S.I. 2005 No. 2042)
- The Civil Contingencies Act 2004 (Amendment of List of Responders) Order 2005 (S.I. 2005 No. 2043)
- The St Benedict's Catholic Primary School (Designation as having a Religious Character) Order 2005 (S.I. 2005 No. 2044)
- The Income Tax (Construction Industry Scheme) Regulations 2005 (S.I. 2005 No. 2045)
- The Northern Ireland Act 2000 (Modification) (No. 2) Order 2005 (S.I. 2005 No. 2046)
- The International Tribunal for the Law of the Sea (Immunities and Privileges) Order 2005 (S.I. 2005 No. 2047)
- The Hull and East Riding Community Health National Health Service Trust (Change of Name) (Establishment) Amendment Order 2005 (S.I. 2005 No. 2048)
- The Civil Partnership (Contracted-out Occupational and Appropriate Personal Pension Schemes) (Surviving Civil Partners) Order 2005 (S.I. 2005 No. 2050)
- The Discretionary Housing Payments (Grants) Amendment Order 2005 (S.I. 2005 No. 2052)
- The Civil Partnership (Pensions and Benefit Payments) (Consequential, etc. Provisions) Order 2005 (S.I. 2005 No. 2053)
- The Remand in Custody (Effect of Concurrent and Consecutive Sentences of Imprisonment) Rules 2005 (S.I. 2005 No. 2054)
- The Offshore Petroleum Activities (Oil Pollution Prevention and Control) Regulations 2005 (S.I. 2005 No. 2055)
- The Enrolment of Deeds (Change of Name) (Amendment) Regulations 2005 (S.I. 2005 No. 2056 (L. 20 ))
- The Food Labelling (Amendment) (England) (No. 2) Regulations 2005 (S.I. 2005 No. 2057)
- The Wanstead High School (Change to School Session Times) Order 2005 (S.I. 2005 No. 2058)
- The Food Hygiene (England) Regulations 2005 (S.I. 2005 No. 2059)
- The Fire (Scotland) Act 2005 (Consequential Provisions and Modifications) Order 2005 (S.I. 2005 No. 2060 (S. 7 ))
- The Medicines and Healthcare Products Regulatory Agency Trading Fund (Amendment) Order 2005 (S.I. 2005 No. 2061)
- The Further and Higher Education (Scotland) Act 2005 (Consequential Modifications) Order 2005 (S.I. 2005 No. 2077 (S. 8))
- The Mental Health (Care and Treatment) (Scotland) Act 2003 (Consequential Provisions) Order 2005 (S.I. 2005 No. 2078 (S.9 ))
- The A419 Trunk Road (Commonhead Junction Improvement and Slip Roads) (Detrunking) Order 2005 (S.I. 2005 No 2079)
- The A419 Trunk Road (Commonhead Junction Improvement and Slip Roads) Order 2005 (S.I. 2005 No 2080)
- The Planning and Compulsory Purchase Act 2004 (Commencement No.5 and Savings) Order 2005 (S.I. 2005 No. 2081 (C.90 ))
- The Finance Act 2002, Schedule 26, Parts 2 and 9 (Amendment No. 2) Order 2005 (S.I. 2005 No. 2082)
- The Education (Mandatory Awards) (Amendment) Regulations 2005 (S.I. 2005 No. 2083)
- The Education (Student Support) (Amendment) (No. 2) Regulations 2005 (S.I. 2005 No. 2084)
- The Town and Country Planning (Isles of Scilly) Order 2005 (S.I. 2005 No. 2085)
- The Town and Country Planning (General Development Procedure) (Amendment) (England) Order 2005 (S.I. 2005 No. 2087)
- The Southern Water Services Limited (Weir Wood Reservoir) (Drought) Order 2005 (S.I. 2005 No. 2088)
- The Industrial Training Levy (Engineering Construction Board) Order 2005 (S.I. 2005 No. 2089)
- The Licensing Act 2003 (Commencement No. 6) Order 2005 (S.I. 2005 No. 2090 (C.91))
- The Licensing Act 2003 (Second appointed day) Order 2005 (S.I. 2005 No. 2091)
- The Railways (Convention on International Carriage by Rail) Regulations 2005 (S.I. 2005 No. 2092)

== 2101–2200 ==
- The Consular Fees Act 1980 (Fees) Order 2005 (S.I. 2005 No. 2112)
- The Occupational Pension Schemes (Miscellaneous Amendments) Regulations 2005 (S.I. 2005 No. 2113)
- The Civil Partnership Act 2004 (Amendments to Subordinate Legislation) Order 2005 (S.I. 2005 No. 2114)
- The Town and Country Planning (Major Infrastructure Project Inquiries Procedure) (England) Rules 2005 (S.I. 2005 No. 2115)
- The Diseases of Poultry Declaratory (Infected Area) (England) (No. 2) Order 2005 (S.I. 2005 No. 2116)
- Aldwark Bridge (Revision of Tolls and Traffic Classification) Order 2005 (SI 2005/2117)
- The Private Security Industry (Licences) (Amendment) (No. 2) Regulations 2005 (S.I. 2005 No. 2118)
- The Education (Student Loans) (Amendment) (No. 2) (England and Wales) Regulations 2005 (S.I. 2005 No. 2119)
- The General and Specialist Medical Practice (Education, Training and Qualifications) Amendment Order 2005 (S.I. 2005 No. 2120)
- The Local Authorities (Elected Mayors) (England) Regulations 2005 (S.I. 2005 No. 2121)
- The Criminal Justice Act 2003 (Commencement No.8 and Transitional and Saving Provisions) Order 2005 (Supplementary Provisions) Order 2005 (S.I. 2005 No. 2122)
- The Southern Water Services Limited (Weir Wood Reservoir) (Drought) (No.2) Order 2005 (S.I. 2005 No. 2141)
- The Children and Young People's Plan (England) Regulations 2005 (S.I. 2005 No. 2149)
- The Road Traffic (Permitted Parking Area and Special Parking Area) (County of Buckinghamshire) (District of Chiltern) Order 2005 (S.I. 2005 No. 2151)
- The Education (School Information) (England) (Amendment) Regulations 2005 (S.I. 2005 No. 2152)
- The Pension Protection Fund (Entry Rules) Amendment Regulations 2005 (S.I. 2005 No. 2153)
- The Social Security (Claims and Payments) Amendment (No. 3) Regulations 2005 (S.I. 2005 No. 2154)
- The Road Traffic (Permitted Parking Area and Special Parking Area) (Borough of Stockton-on-Tees) Order 2005 (S.I. 2005 No. 2155)
- The Transport for London (Rickmansworth Station) Order 2005 (S.I. 2005 No. 2156)
- The Occupational Pension Schemes (Winding Up) (Modification for Multi-employer Schemes and Miscellaneous Amendments) Regulations 2005 (S.I. 2005 No. 2159)
- The Income-related Benefits (Amendment) Regulations 2005 (S.I. 2005 No. 2183)
- The Occupational Pension Schemes (Fraud Compensation Payments and Miscellaneous Amendments) Regulations 2005 (S.I. 2005 No. 2184)
- The Railways Act 1993 (Determination of Turnover) Order 2005 (S.I. 2005 No. 2185)
- The Pensions Regulator (Financial Support Directions etc.) Regulations 2005 (S.I. 2005 No. 2188)
- The Financial Assistance Scheme (Provision of Information and Administration of Payments) Regulations 2005 (S.I. 2005 No. 2189)
- The Teachers' Pensions (Amendment) Regulations 2005 (S.I. 2005 No. 2198)
- The Tax Credit (Payment by Employers, etc.) (Amendment) Regulations 2005 (S.I. 2005 No. 2200)

== 2201–2300 ==
- The Income Tax (Car Benefits) (Reduction of Value of Appropriate Percentage) (Amendment) Regulations 2005 (S.I. 2005 No. 2209)
- The Friendly Societies (Accounts and Related Provisions) (Amendment) Regulations 2005 (S.I. 2005 No. 2210)
- The Friendly Societies Act 1992 (International Accounting Standards and Other Accounting Amendments) Order 2005 (S.I. 2005 No. 2211)
- The Education (School Teachers' Pay and Conditions) (No. 3) Order 2005 (S.I. 2005 No. 2212)
- The Adoption and Children Act 2002 (Commencement No. 9) Order 2005 (S.I. 2005 No. 2213 (C.92))
- The River Tyne (Tunnels) Order 2005 (S.I. 2005 No. 2222)
- The Drugs Act 2005 (Commencement No. 2) Order 2005 (S.I. 2005 No. 2223 (C. 93))
- The Occupational Pension Schemes (Employer Debt etc.) (Amendment) Regulations 2005 (S.I. 2005 No. 2224)
- The Value Added Tax (Amendment) (No. 2) Regulations 2005 (S.I. 2005 No. 2231)
- The Part-time Workers (Prevention of Less Favourable Treatment) Regulations 2000 (Amendment) Order 2005 (S.I. 2005 No. 2240)
- The Working Time Regulations 1998 (Amendment) Order 2005 (S.I. 2005 No. 2241)
- The Electricity (Exemption from the Requirement for a Generation Licence) (England and Wales) Order 2005 (S.I. 2005 No. 2242)
- The Company Auditors (Recognition Orders) (Application Fees) and the Companies Act 1989 (Recognised Supervisory Bodies) (Periodical Fees) (Revocation) Regulations 2005 (S.I. 2005 No. 2243)
- The A500 Trunk Road in Cheshire (Basford-Hough-Shavington Bypass to M6 Junction 16) (Detrunking) Order 2005 (S.I. 2005 No. 2249)
- The Nursing and Midwifery Council (Election Scheme) Rules Order of Council 2005 (S.I. 2005 No. 2250)
- The Private Security Industry Act 2001 (Designated Activities) (No. 3) Order 2005 (S.I. 2005 No. 2251)
- The Railways Act 2005 (Commencement No. 3) Order 2005 (S.I. 2005 No. 2252 (C. 94))
- The Health and Social Care (Community Health and Standards) Act 2003 (Commencement) (No. 7) Order 2005 (S.I. 2005 No. 2278 (C.95))
- The Health and Social Care (Community Health and Standards) Act 2003 (Savings) Order 2005 (S.I. 2005 No. 2279)
- The Companies Act 1985 (Investment Companies and Accounting and Audit Amendments) Regulations 2005 (S.I. 2005 No. 2280)
- The Companies (Summary Financial Statement) (Amendment) Regulations 2005 (S.I. 2005 No. 2281)
- The Companies (Revision of Defective Accounts and Report) (Amendment) Regulations 2005 (S.I. 2005 No. 2282)
- The Constitutional Reform Act 2005 (Commencement No. 2) Order 2005 (S.I. 2005 No. 2284 (C. 96))
- The Diseases of Poultry Declaratory (Infected Area) (Merger of Zones) (England) Order 2005 (S.I. 2005 No. 2285)
- The Merchant Shipping (Bridge Visibility) (Small Passenger Ships) Regulations 2005 (S.I. 2005 No. 2286)
- The Transport (Guided Systems)(England)(Amendment) Order 2005 (S.I. 2005 No. 2290)
- The Cardiff to Glan Conwy Trunk Road (A470) (Blaenau Ffestiniog to Cancoed Improvement) Order 2005 (S.I. 2005 No. 2291 (W.170))
- Gorchymyn Cefnffordd Caerdydd i Lan Conwy (A470) (Gwelliant Blaenau Ffestiniog i Gancoed) 2005 (S.I. 2005 Rhif 2291 (Cy.170))
- The Civil Procedure (Amendment No.3) Rules 2005 (S.I. 2005 No. 2292 (L.21))
- The Social Security (Tax Credits) Amendment Regulations 2005 (S.I. 2005 No. 2294)
- The Tonnage Tax (Training Requirement) (Amendment) Regulations 2005 (S.I. 2005 No. 2295)
- The Day Care and Child Minding (Disqualification) (England) Regulations 2005 (S.I. 2005 No. 2296)
- The Day Care and Child Minding (Suitability) (England) Regulations 2005 (S.I. 2005 No. 2297)
- The Children Act 2004 (Commencement No. 4 and Savings) (England) Order 2005 (S.I. 2005 No. 2298 (C.97))
- The Nursery Education (Inspection) (England) Regulations 2005 (S.I. 2005 No. 2299)
- The Day Care and Child Minding (Inspection) (England) Regulations 2005 (S.I. 2005 No. 2300)

== 2301–2400 ==
- The Day Care and Child Minding (Registration Fees) (England) Regulations 2005 (S.I. 2005 No. 2301)
- The Day Care and Child Minding (Functions of Local Authorities: Information, Advice and Training) (England) (Amendment) Regulations 2005 (S.I. 2005 No. 2302)
- The Day Care and Child Minding (National Standards) (Amendment) (England) Regulations 2005 (S.I. 2005 No. 2303)
- The Smoke Control Areas (Exempted Fireplaces) (England) Order 2005 (S.I. 2005 No. 2304)
- The Conditional Fee Agreements (Revocation) Regulations 2005 (S.I. 2005 No. 2305)
- The Access to Justice (Membership Organisation) Regulations 2005 (S.I. 2005 No. 2306)
- The Companies Act 1989 (Delegation) Order 2005 (S.I. 2005 No. 2337)
- The Education (School Performance Information) (England) (Amendment) (No. 2) Regulations 2005 (S.I. 2005 No. 2338)
- The Community Design Regulations 2005 (S.I. 2005 No. 2339)
- The Enterprise Act 2002 (Bodies Designated to make Super-complaints) (Amendment) Order 2005 (S.I. 2005 No. 2340)
- The Motor Vehicles (Tests) (Amendment) (No. 2) Regulations 2005 (S.I. 2005 No. 2341)
- The Public Service Vehicles (Conditions of Fitness, Equipment, Use and Certification) (Amendment) (No. 2) Regulations 2005 (S.I. 2005 No. 2342)
- The Goods Vehicles (Plating and Testing) (Amendment) Regulations 2005 (S.I. 2005 No. 2343)
- The Road Vehicles (Registration and Licensing) (Amendment) Regulations 2005 (S.I. 2005 No. 2344)
- The Goods Vehicles (Licensing of Operators) (Fees) (Amendment) (Regulations) 2005 (S.I. 2005 No. 2345)
- The Public Service Vehicles (Operators' Licences) (Fees) (Amendment) Regulations 2005 (S.I. 2005 No. 2346)
- The Animal By-Products Regulations 2005 (S.I. 2005 No. 2347)
- The Community Bus (Amendment) Regulations 2005 (S.I. 2005 No. 2353)
- The Minibus and Other Section 19 Permit Buses (Amendment) Regulations 2005 (S.I. 2005 No. 2354)
- The Public Service Vehicles (Registration of Local Services) (Amendment) (England and Wales) Regulations 2005 (S.I. 2005 No. 2355)
- The Finance Act 2004, Section 18 (Appointed Day) Order 2005 (S.I. 2005 No. 2356 (C.98))
- The Highcliffe St Mark Primary School (Designation as having a Religious Character) Order 2005 (S.I. 2005 No. 2357)
- The Immigration (Leave to Remain) (Prescribed Forms and Procedures) (No. 2) Regulations 2005 (S.I. 2005 No. 2358)
- The Food Safety (General Food Hygiene) (Amendment) (England) Regulations 2005 (S.I. 2005 No. 2359)
- The Occupational Pension Schemes (Trust and Retirement Benefits Exemption) Regulations 2005 (S.I. 2005 No. 2360)
- The General and Specialist Medical Practice (Education, Training and Qualifications) Transitional Provisions Order 2005 (S.I. 2005 No. 2361)
- The Road Traffic (Permitted Parking Area and Special Parking Area) (County of Suffolk) (Borough of Ipswich) Order 2005 (S.I. 2005 No. 2362)
- The Diseases of Poultry Declaratory (Infected Area) (Merger of Zones) (Revocation) (England) Order 2005 (S.I. 2005 No. 2363)
- The Compromise Agreements (Description of Person) Order 2005 (S.I. 2005 No. 2364)
- The Specified Body (Consumer Claims) Order 2005 (S.I. 2005 No. 2365)
- The Licensing Act 2003 (Personal licence: relevant offences) (Amendment) Order 2005 (S.I. 2005 No. 2366)
- The Civil Partnership Act 2004 (Commencement No. 1) (Northern Ireland) Order 2005 (S.I. 2005 No. 2399 (C. 99))
- The Accession (Immigration and Worker Registration) (Amendment) Regulations 2005 (S.I. 2005 No. 2400)

== 2401–2500 ==
- The Pension Schemes (Categories) Regulations 2005 (S.I. 2005 No. 2401)
- The Collection of Fines (Pilot Schemes) (Amendment No. 3) Order 2005 (S.I. 2005 No. 2410)
- The Children Act 2004 (Designation of NHS Direct) Order 2005 (S.I. 2005 No. 2411)
- The Immigration (Eligibility for Assistance) (Scotland and Northern Ireland) (Revocation) Regulations 2005 (S.I. 2005 No. 2412)
- The Medical Act 1983 (Approved Medical Practices and Conditions of Residence) Regulations 2005 (S.I. 2005 No. 2413)
- The NHS Business Services Authority (Awdurdod Gwasanaethau Busnes y GIG) (Establishment and Constitution) Order 2005 (S.I. 2005 No. 2414)
- The NHS Business Services Authority (Awdurdod Gwasanaethau Busnes y GIG) Regulations 2005 (S.I. 2005 No. 2415)
- The Local Authorities (Categorisation) (England) (No.2) Order 2005 (S.I. 2005 No. 2416)
- The Companies (Disclosure of Auditor Remuneration) Regulations 2005 (S.I. 2005 No. 2417)
- The Enterprise Act 2002 (Part 8 Community Infringements Specified UK Laws) (Amendment) Order 2005 (S.I. 2005 No. 2418)
- The Employment Relations Act 2004 (Commencement No.4 and Transitional Provisions) Order 2005 (S.I. 2005 No. 2419 (C.100))
- The Employment Code of Practice (Industrial Action Ballots and Notice to Employers) Order 2005 (S.I. 2005 No. 2420)
- The Employment Code of Practice (Access and Unfair Practices during Recognition and Derecognition Ballots) Order 2005 (S.I. 2005 No. 2421)
- The Social Security (Contributions) (Amendment No. 5) Regulations 2005 (S.I. 2005 No. 2422)
- The Capital Allowances (Environmentally Beneficial Plant and Machinery) (Amendment) Order 2005 (S.I. 2005 No. 2423)
- The Capital Allowances (Energy-saving Plant and Machinery) (Amendment) Order 2005 (S.I. 2005 No. 2424)
- The Gambling Act 2005 (Commencement No.1) Order 2005 (S.I. 2005 No. 2425 (C.101))
- The Occupational Pension Schemes (Administration and Audited Accounts) (Amendment) Regulations 2005 (S.I. 2005 No. 2426)
- The Chelsea and Westminster Healthcare National Health Service Trust (Transfer of Trust Property) Order 2005 (S.I. 2005 No. 2427)
- The Social Security (Incapacity) (Miscellaneous Amendments) Regulations 2005 (S.I. 2005 No. 2446)
- The Pensions Act 2004 (Commencement No. 7) Order 2005 (S.I. 2005 No. 2447 (C.102))
- The Child Minding and Day Care (Applications for Registration) (England) (Amendment) Regulations 2005 (S.I. 2005 No. 2448)
- The Education (School Performance Targets) (England) (Amendment) Regulations 2005 (S.I. 2005 No. 2449)
- The Education (Local Education Authority Performance Targets) (England) Regulations 2005 (S.I. 2005 No. 2450)
- The Biocidal Products (Amendment) Regulations 2005 (S.I. 2005 No. 2451)
- The Motor Vehicles (EC Type Approval) (Amendment) Regulations 2005 (S.I. 2005 No. 2454)
- The Gambling Act 2005 (Commencement No. 2 and Transitional Provisions) Order 2005 (S.I. 2005 No. 2455 (C.103))
- The International Carriage of Dangerous Goods by Road (Fees) (Amendment) Regulations 2005 (S.I. 2005 No. 2456)
- The International Transport of Goods under Cover of TIR Carnets (Fees) (Amendment) Regulations 2005 (S.I. 2005 No. 2457)
- The Passenger and Goods Vehicles (Recording Equipment) (Approval of Fitters and Workshops) (Fees) (Amendment) Regulations 2005 (S.I. 2005 No. 2458)
- The Countryside and Rights of Way Act 2000 (Commencement No 9) Order 2005 (S.I. 2005 No. 2459 (C.104))
- The Road Vehicles (Payment of Duty by Credit Card) (Prescribed Fee) Regulations 2005 (S.I. 2005 No. 2460)
- The Public Rights of Way (Register of Applications under section 53(5) of the Wildlife and Countryside Act 1981) (England) Regulations 2005 (S.I. 2005 No. 2461)
- The Taxes (Interest Rate) (Amendment) Regulations 2005 (S.I. 2005 No. 2462)
- The Crime Prevention (Designated Areas) (No. 3) Order 2005 (S.I. 2005 No. 2463)
- The Public Interest Disclosure (Prescribed Persons)(Amendment) Order 2005 (S.I. 2005 No. 2464)
- The Social Security (Miscellaneous Amendments) (No. 2) Regulations 2005 (S.I. 2005 No. 2465)
- The Genetically Modified Organisms (Contained Use) (Amendment) Regulations 2005 (S.I. 2005 No. 2466)
- The Employment Equality (Sex Discrimination) Regulations 2005 (S.I. 2005 No. 2467)
- The Enterprise Act 2002 (Bodies Designated to make Super-complaints) (Amendment) Order 2005 (S.I. 2005 No. 2468)
- The Detergents Regulations 2005 (S.I. 2005 No. 2469)
- The Millennium Commission (Reduction in Membership) Order 2005 (S.I. 2005 No. 2470)
- The Patents Act 2004 (Commencement No. 3 and Transitional Provisions) Order 2005 (S.I. 2005 No. 2471 (C.105))
- The Ramsey Internal Drainage Board Order 2005 (S.I. 2005 No. 2477)
- The Energy Administration Rules 2005 (S.I. 2005 No. 2483)
- The Patents (Amendment) Rules 2005 (S.I. 2005 No. 2496)

== 2501–2600 ==
- The Housing Benefit and Council Tax Benefit (Miscellaneous Amendments) (No.3) Regulations 2005 (S.I. 2005 No. 2502)
- Constitutional Reform Act 2005 (Commencement No. 3) Order 2005 (S.I. 2005 No. 2505 (C.106))
- Constitutional Reform Act 2005 (Transitional and Consequential Provisions) Order 2005 (S.I. 2005 No. 2506)
- The River Deben Internal Drainage Board Order 2005 (S.I. 2005 No. 2512)
- The Plant Health (Forestry) Order 2005 (S.I. 2005 No. 2517)
- The Liverpool Housing Action Trust (Dissolution) Order 2005 (S.I. 2005 No. 2518)
- The NHS Blood and Transplant (Gwaed a Thrawsblaniadau'r GIG) (Establishment and Constitution) Order 2005 (S.I. 2005 No. 2529)
- The Plant Health (England) Order 2005 (S.I. 2005 No. 2530)
- The NHS Blood and Transplant (Gwaed a Thrawsblaniadau'r GIG) Regulations 2005 (S.I. 2005 No. 2531)
- The National Blood Authority and United Kingdom Transplant (Abolition) Order 2005 (S.I. 2005 No. 2532)
- The Northern Ireland (Sentences) Act 1998 (Specified Organisations) Order 2005 (S.I. 2005 No. 2558)
- The Road Vehicles Lighting (Amendment) Regulations 2005 (S.I. 2005 No. 2559)
- The Road Vehicles (Construction and Use)(Amendment)( No.2) Regulations 2005 (S.I. 2005 No. 2560)
- The Individual Savings Account (Amendment No. 2) Regulations 2005 (S.I. 2005 No. 2561)
- The Personal Equity Plan (Amendment) Regulations 2005 (S.I. 2005 No. 2562)
- The Education Act 2002 (Commencement No. 6 and Transitional and Saving Provisions) (Amendment) Order 2005 (S.I. 2005 No. 2570 (C.107))
- The Chemicals (Hazard Information and Packaging for Supply) (Amendment) Regulations 2005 (S.I. 2005 No. 2571)
- The Thurrock Development Corporation (Planning Functions) Order 2005 (S.I. 2005 No. 2572)

== 2601–2700 ==
- The Great Yarmouth Outer Harbour Revision Order 2005 (S.I. 2005 No. 2601)
- The Great Yarmouth Outer Harbour (No. 2) Revision Order 2005 (S.I. 2005 No. 2602)
- The National Health Service Estate Management and Health Building Agency Trading Fund (Revocation) Order 2005 (S.I. 2005 No. 2603)
- The Social Security (Incapacity Benefit Work-focused Interviews) Amendment (No. 2) Regulations 2005 (S.I. 2005 No. 2604)
- The Housing Renewal Grants (Amendment) (Wales) Regulations 2005 (S.I. 2005 No. 2605 (W.180))
- Rheoliadau Grantiau Adnewyddu Tai (Diwygio) (Cymru) 2005 (S.I. 2005 Rhif 2605 (Cy.180))
- The Criminal Defence Service (Funding) (Amendment) Order 2005 (S.I. 2005 No. 2621)
- The Costs in Criminal Cases (General) (Amendment) Regulations 2005 (S.I. 2005 No. 2622)
- The Sea Fishing (Enforcement of Community Control Measures) (Amendment) Order 2005 (S.I. 2005 No. 2624)
- The Criminal Procedure Rule Committee (Amendment of Constitution) Order 2005 (S.I. 2005 No. 2625)
- The Official Feed and Food Controls (England) Regulations 2005 (S.I. 2005 No. 2626)
- Torbay Primary Care Trust (Change of Name) (Establishment) Amendment Order 2005 (S.I. 2005 No. 2627)
- The Railways (Provision etc. of Railway Facilities) (Exemptions) Order 2005 (S.I. 2005 No. 2628)
- The Tryptophan in Food (England) Regulations 2005 (S.I. 2005 No. 2630)
- The Human Tissue Act 2004 (Commencement No. 2) Order 2005 (S.I. 2005 No. 2632 (C. 108))
- The TSE (England) (Amendment) (No.2) Regulations 2005 (S.I. 2005 No. 2633)
- The Offshore Installations (Safety Zones) (No. 2) Order 2005 (S.I. 2005 No. 2669)
- The Restriction On Conduct (Specialist Advertising Services) (Revocation) Order 2005 (S.I. 2005 No. 2670)
- The Beet Seed (England) (Amendment) Regulations 2005 (S.I. 2005 No. 2671)
- The Cereal Seed (England) (Amendment) Regulations 2005 (S.I. 2005 No. 2672)
- The Fodder Plant Seed (England) (Amendment) Regulations 2005 (S.I. 2005 No. 2673)
- The Oil and Fibre Plant Seed (England) (Amendment) Regulations 2005 (S.I. 2005 No. 2674)
- The Vegetable Seed (England) (Amendment) Regulations 2005 (S.I. 2005 No. 2675)
- The Seed (Registration, Licensing and Enforcement) (England) (Amendment) Regulations 2005 (S.I. 2005 No. 2676)
- The Social Security (Deferral of Retirement Pensions, Shared Additional Pension and Graduated Retirement Benefit) (Miscellaneous Provisions) Regulations 2005 (S.I. 2005 No. 2677)
- The Housing (Right of First Refusal) (Wales) Regulations 2005 (S.I. 2005 No. 2680 (W.186))
- Rheoliadau Tai (Hawl Cynnig Cyntaf) (Cymru) 2005 (S.I. 2005 Rhif 2680 (Cy.186))
- The Housing (Right to Buy) (Information to Secure Tenants) (Wales) Order 2005 (S.I. 2005 No. 2681 (W.187))
- Gorchymyn Tai (Hawl i Brynu) (Gwybodaeth i Denantiaid Diogel) (Cymru) 2005 (S.I. 2005 Rhif 2681 (Cy.187))
- The High-activity Sealed Radioactive Sources and Orphan Sources Regulations 2005 (S.I. 2005 No. 2686)
- The Social Security (Care Homes and Independent Hospitals) Regulations 2005 (S.I. 2005 No. 2687)
- The Access to Information (Post-Commencement Adoptions) (Wales) Regulations 2005 (S.I. 2005 No. 2689 (W.189))
- Rheoliadau Mynediad i Wybodaeth (Mabwysiadu Ôl-gychwyn) (Cymru) 2005 (S.I. 2005 Rhif 2689 (Cy.189))
- The Education (Student Loans) (Repayment) (Amendment) Regulations 2005 (S.I. 2005 No. 2690)
- The Income Tax (Pay as You Earn) (Amendment) Regulations 2005 (S.I. 2005 No. 2691)
- The Criminal Procedure and Investigations Act 1996 (Code of Practice) (Northern Ireland) Order 2005 (S.I. 2005 No. 2692)
- The Civil Aviation (Investigation of Military Air Accidents at Civil Aerodromes) Regulations 2005 (S.I. 2005 No. 2693)

== 2701–2800 ==
- The Adoption Information and Intermediary Services (Pre-Commencement Adoptions) (Wales) Regulations 2005 (S.I. 2005 No. 2701 (W.190))
- Rheoliadau Gwybodaeth Mabwysiadu a Gwasanaethau Cyfryngol (Mabwysiadau Cyn-gychwyn) (Cymru) 2005 (S.I. 2005 Rhif 2701 (Cy.190))
- The Police (Retention and Disposal of Motor Vehicles) (Amendment) Regulations 2005 (S.I. 2005 No. 2702)
- The Disability Discrimination (Questions and Replies) Order 2005 (S.I. 2005 No. 2703)
- The Consumer Protection (Code of Practice for Traders on Price Indications) Approval Order 2005 (S.I. 2005 No. 2705)
- The District of Stroud (Parishes and Electoral Changes) (Amendment) Order 2005 (S.I. 2005 No. 2706)
- The Borough of Wigan (Electoral Changes) (Amendment) Order 2005 (S.I. 2005 No. 2707)
- The City of Nottingham (Electoral Changes) (Amendment) Order 2005 (S.I. 2005 No. 2709)
- The District of Craven (Electoral Changes) (Amendment) Order 2005 (S.I. 2005 No. 2710)
- The Borough of Oldham (Electoral Changes) (Amendment) Order 2005 (S.I. 2005 No. 2711)
- The Civil Procedure (Modification of Crown Proceedings Act 1947) Order 2005 (S.I. 2005 No. 2712)
- The Road Vehicles (Registration and Licensing) (Amendment) (No.2) Regulations 2005 (S.I. 2005 No. 2713)
- The Water Act 2003 (Commencement No. 5, Transitional Provisions and Savings) Order 2005 (S.I. 2005 No. 2714 (C. 109))
- The Charges for Inspections and Controls (Amendment) (No. 2) Regulations 2005 (S.I. 2005 No. 2715)
- The Motor Cars (Driving Instruction) (Amendment) Regulations 2005 (S.I. 2005 No. 2716)
- The Motor Vehicles (Driving Licences) (Amendment) (No 2) Regulations 2005 (S.I. 2005 No. 2717)
- The Office of Communications (Membership) Order 2005 (S.I. 2005 No. 2718)
- The Bovine Products (Restriction on Placing on the Market) (England) Regulations 2005 (S.I. 2005 No. 2719)
- The Adoption Support Agencies (England) and Adoption Agencies (Miscellaneous Amendments) Regulations 2005 (S.I. 2005 No. 2720)
- The London Thames Gateway Development Corporation (Planning Functions) Order 2005 (S.I. 2005 No. 2721)
- Planning and Compulsory Purchase Act 2004 (Commencement No. 4 and Consequential, Transitional and Savings Provisions) (Wales) Order 2005 (S.I. 2005 No. 2722 (W.193) (C.110))
- Gorchymyn Deddf Cynllunio a Phrynu Gorfodol 2004 (Cychwyn Rhif 4 a Darpariaethau Canlyniadol a Throsiannol a Darpariaethau Arbed) (Cymru) 2005 (S.I. 2005 Rhif 2722 (Cy.193) (C.110))
- The Social Fund Cold Weather Payments (General) Amendment Regulations 2005 (S.I. 2005 No. 2724)
- The North Somerset Internal Drainage Board Order 2005 (S.I. 2005 No. 2725)
- The Plant Breeders' Rights (Discontinuation of Prior Use Exemption) Order 2005 (S.I. 2005 No. 2726)
- The Social Security (Work-focused Interviews) Amendment Regulations 2005 (S.I. 2005 No. 2727)
- The Pensions Ombudsman (Disclosure of Information) (Amendment of Specified Persons) Order 2005 (S.I. 2005 No. 2743)
- The Courts Act 2003 (Commencement No. 11 and Transitional Provision) Order 2005 (S.I. 2005 No. 2744 (C.111))
- The Veterinary Medicines Regulations 2005 (S.I. 2005 No. 2745)
- The Companies (Welsh Language Forms) (Amendment) Regulations 2005 (S.I. 2005 No. 2746)
- Rheoliadau (Ffurflenni Cymraeg) Cwmnïau (Diwygiad) 2005 (S.I. 2005 Rhif 2746)
- The Companies (Forms) (Amendment) Regulations 2005 (S.I. 2005 No. 2747)
- The Restriction of the Use of Certain Hazardous Substances in Electrical and Electronic Equipment Regulations 2005 (S.I. 2005 No. 2748)
- Solicitors (Compensation for Inadequate Professional Services) Order 2005 (S.I. 2005 No. 2749)
- The Medicines (Traditional Herbal Medicinal Products for Human Use) Regulations 2005 (S.I. 2005 No. 2750)
- The Supply of Relevant Veterinary Medicinal Products Order 2005 (S.I. 2005 No. 2751)
- The Countryside and Rights of Way Act 2000 (Commencement No. 10) Order 2005 (S.I. 2005 No. 2752 (C. 112))
- Medicines (Homoeopathic Medicinal Products for Human Use) Amendment Regulations 2005 (S.I. 2005 No. 2753)
- The Medicines (Advisory Bodies) (No. 2) Regulations 2005 (S.I. 2005 No. 2754)
- The Bus Lane Contraventions (Approved Local Authorities) (England) Order 2005 (S.I. 2005 No. 2755)
- The Bus Lanes (Approved Devices) (England) Order 2005 (S.I. 2005 No. 2756)
- The Bus Lane Contraventions (Penalty Charges, Adjudication and Enforcement) (England) Regulations 2005 (S.I. 2005 No. 2757)
- The Tribunals and Inquiries (Bus Lane Adjudicators) (England) Order 2005 (S.I. 2005 No. 2758)
- The Medicines (Marketing Authorisations Etc.) Amendment Regulations 2005 (S.I. 2005 No. 2759)
- Civil Partnership (Registration Abroad and Certificates) Order 2005 (S.I. 2005 No. 2761)
- The Consular Fees (Civil Partnership) Order 2005 (S.I. 2005 No. 2762)
- The Air Navigation (Overseas Territories) (Amendment) Order 2005 (S.I. 2005 No. 2763)
- The Education (Inspectors of Schools in England) (No. 3) Order 2005 (S.I. 2005 No. 2764)
- The Social Security (Reciprocal Agreements) Order 2005 (S.I. 2005 No. 2765)
- The European Communities (Designation) (No.3) Order 2005 (S.I. 2005 No. 2766)
- The Volatile Organic Compounds in Paints, Varnishes and Vehicle Refinishing Products Regulations 2005 (S.I. 2005 No. 2773)
- The Disability Discrimination Act 2005 (Commencement No. 2) Order 2005 (S.I. 2005 No. 2774 (C113))
- The Gaming Machines (Maximum Prizes) Regulations 2005 (S.I. 2005 No. 2775)
- The Gaming Act 1968 (Variation of Monetary Limits) Order 2005 (S.I. 2005 No. 2776)
- The Nationality, Immigration and Asylum Act 2002 (Commencement No. 10) Order 2005 (S.I. 2005 No. 2782 (C. 114))
- The Criminal Defence Service (Recovery of Defence Costs Orders) (Amendment) Regulations 2005 (S.I. 2005 No. 2783)
- The Criminal Defence Service (General) (No. 2) (Amendment) Regulations 2005 (S.I. 2005 No. 2784)
- The British Nationality (General) (Amendment) Regulations 2005 (S.I. 2005 No. 2785)
- The Leicestershire County Council (Ashby de la Zouch Canal Extension) Order 2005 (S.I. 2005 No. 2786)
- The Medicines (Advertising Amendments) Regulations 2005 (S.I. 2005 No. 2787)
- The Medicines (Advisory Bodies) (Terms of Office of Members) Regulations 2005 (S.I. 2005 No. 2788)
- The Medicines for Human Use (Manufacturing, Wholesale Dealing and Miscellaneous Amendments) Regulations 2005 (S.I. 2005 No. 2789)
- The Donations to Charity by Individuals (Appropriate Declarations) (Amendment) Regulations 2005 (S.I. 2005 No. 2790)
- The Herbal Medicines Advisory Committee Order 2005 (S.I. 2005 No. 2791)
- The Human Tissue Act 2004 (Commencement No.3 and Transitional Provisions) Order 2005 (S.I. 2005 No. 2792 (C.115))
- The Family Procedure (Adoption) Rules 2005 (S.I. 2005 No. 2795 (L. 22))
- The Justices' Clerks (Amendment) Rules 2005 (S.I. 2005 No. 2796 (L.23))
- The Children (Allocation of Proceedings) (Amendment No. 2) Order 2005 (S.I. 2005 No. 2797 (L. 24))
- The Criminal Justice Act 2003 (Mandatory Life Sentences: Appeals in Transitional Cases) Order 2005 (S.I. 2005 No. 2798)
- The Public Services Ombudsman (Wales) Act 2005 (Commencement No. 1 and Transitional Provisions and Savings) Order 2005 (S.I. 2005 No. 2800 (W.199) (C.116))
- Gorchymyn Deddf Ombwdsmon Gwasanaethau Cyhoeddus (Cymru) 2005 (Cychwyn Rhif 1 a Darpariaethau Trosiannol ac Arbedion) 2005 (S.I. 2005 Rhif 2800 (Cy.199) (C.116))

== 2801–2900 ==
- The Courts Act 2003 (Revocations, Savings and Transitional Provisions) Order 2005 (S.I. 2005 No. 2804)
- The Parental Responsibility Agreement (Amendment) Regulations 2005 (S.I. 2005 No. 2808)
- The Railways Act 2005 (Commencement No. 4) Order 2005 (S.I. 2005 No. 2812 (C.117))
- The Disclosure of Vehicle Insurance Information Regulations 2005 (S.I. 2005 No. 2833)
- The Police (Amendment) Regulations 2005 (S.I. 2005 No. 2834)
- The Food Labelling (Amendment) (Wales) (No. 2) Regulations 2005 (S.I. 2005 No. 2835 (W.200))
- Rheoliadau Labelu Bwyd (Diwygio) (Cymru) (Rhif 2) 2005 (S.I. 2005 Rhif 2835 (Cy.200))
- The Southwark London Borough Council (Prescribed Alteration) Order 2005 (S.I. 2005 No. 2836)
- The Education (Assisted Places) (Incidental Expenses) (Amendment) (Wales) Regulations 2005 (S.I. 2005 No. 2837 (W.201))
- Rheoliadau Addysg (Lleoedd a Gynorthwyir) (Mân Dreuliau) (Diwygio) (Cymru) 2005 (S.I. 2005 Rhif 2837 (Cy.201))
- The Education (Assisted Places) (Amendment) (Wales) Regulations 2005 (S.I. 2005 No. 2838 (W.202))
- Rheoliadau Addysg (Lleoedd a Gynorthwyir) (Diwygio) (Cymru) 2005 (S.I. 2005 Rhif 2838 (Cy.202))
- The Town and Country Planning (Local Development Plan) (Wales) Regulations 2005 (S.I. 2005 No. 2839 (W.203))
- Rheoliadau Cynllunio Gwlad a Thref (Cynlluniau Datblygu Lleol) (Cymru) 2005 (S.I. 2005 Rhif 2839 (Cy.203))
- The Avian Influenza and Newcastle Disease (Contingency Planning) (Wales) Order 2005 (S.I. 2005 No. 2840 (W.204))
- Gorchymyn Ffliw Adar a Chlefyd Newcastle (Cynllunio Wrth Gefn) (Cymru) 2005 (S.I. 2005 Rhif 2840 (Cy.204))
- The Planning and Compulsory Purchase Act 2004 (Commencement No.6, Transitional Provisions and Savings) Order 2005 (S.I. 2005 No. 2847 (C.118))
- The Domestic Violence, Crime and Victims Act 2004 (Commencement No. 4) Order 2005 (S.I. 2005 No. 2848 (C. 119))
- The Armed Forces Act 2001 (Commencement No.5) Order 2005 (S.I. 2005 No. 2861 (C.120))
- The Transport Act 2000 (Commencement No. 11) Order 2005 (S.I. 2005 No. 2862 (C. 121))
- The Social Landlords (Additional Purposes or Objects) (Amendment) (England) Order 2005 (S.I. 2005 No. 2863)
- The Misuse of Drugs and the Misuse of Drugs (Supply to Addicts) (Amendment) Regulations 2005 (S.I. 2005 No. 2864)
- The Council Tax (Exempt Dwellings) (Amendment) (England) Order 2005 (S.I. 2005 No. 2865)
- The Council Tax (Civil Partners) (England) Regulations 2005 (S.I. 2005 No. 2866)
- The Agricultural Holdings (Units of Production) (England) Order 2005 (S.I. 2005 No. 2867)
- The Royal Parks (Establishment of Eligibility for Transfer and Termination of Employment) Regulations 2005 (S.I. 2005 No. 2868)
- The Housing (Right to Buy) (Prescribed Forms) (Amendment) (England) (No. 3) Regulations 2005 (S.I. 2005 No. 2876)
- The Civil Partnership (Pensions, Social Security and Child Support) (Consequential, etc. Provisions) Order 2005 (S.I. 2005 No. 2877)
- The Social Security (Civil Partnership) (Consequential Amendments) Regulations 2005 (S.I. 2005 No. 2878)
- The Terrorism Act 2000 (Proscribed Organisations) (Amendment) Order 2005 (S.I. 2005 No. 2892)
- The Pension Protection Fund (Insolvent Partnerships) (Amendment of Insolvency Events) Order 2005 (S.I. 2005 No. 2893)
- The Housing Benefit and Council Tax Benefit (Miscellaneous Amendments) (No.4) Regulations 2005 (S.I. 2005 No. 2894)
- The Smoke Control Areas (Authorised Fuels) (England) (Amendment) Regulations 2005 (S.I. 2005 No. 2895)
- The Clean Neighbourhoods and Environment Act 2005 (Commencement No.2, Transitional Provisions and Savings) (England and Wales) Order 2005 (S.I. 2005 No. 2896 (C.122))
- The Adoption and Children Act 2002 (Commencement No. 10 Transitional and Savings Provisions) Order 2005 (S.I. 2005 No. 2897 (C.123 ))
- The Blood Safety and Quality (Amendment) (No. 2) Regulations 2005 (S.I. 2005 No. 2898)
- The Exemption From Income Tax For Certain Interest and Royalty Payments (Amendment to Section 97(1) of the Finance Act 2004 and Section 757(2) of the Income Tax (Trading and Other Income) Act 2005) Order 2005 (S.I. 2005 No. 2899)
- The Waste (Household Waste Duty of Care) (England and Wales) Regulations 2005 (S.I. 2005 No. 2900)

== 2901–3000 ==
- The Disability Discrimination (Service Providers and Public Authorities Carrying Out Functions) Regulations 2005 (S.I. 2005 No. 2901)
- The TSE (Wales) (Amendment) (No. 2) Regulations 2005 (S.I. 2005 No. 2902 (W.205))
- Rheoliadau TSE (Cymru) (Diwygio) (Rhif 2) 2005 (S.I. 2005 Rhif 2902 (Cy.205))
- The Greenhouse Gas Emissions Trading Scheme (Amendment) and National Emissions Inventory Regulations 2005 (S.I. 2005 No. 2903)
- The Housing Benefit and Council Tax Benefit (General) Amendment Regulations 2005 (S.I. 2005 No. 2904)
- The Railway Heritage Scheme Order 2005 (S.I. 2005 No. 2905)
- The Protected Rights (Transfer Payment) (Amendment) Regulations 2005 (S.I. 2005 No. 2906)
- Reporting of Prices of Milk Products (Wales) Regulations 2005 (S.I. 2005 No. 2907 (W.206))
- Rheoliadau Adrodd ar Brisiau Cynhyrchion Llaeth (Cymru) 2005 (S.I. 2005 Rhif 2907 (Cy.206))
- The Housing (Right to Buy) (Designated Rural Areas and Designated Regions) (England) (No 2) Order 2005 (S.I. 2005 No. 2908)
- The Medical Devices (Amendment) Regulations 2005 (S.I. 2005 No. 2909)
- The Education Act 2002 (Commencement No. 7) (Wales) Order 2005 (S.I. 2005 No. 2910 (W.207) (C.124))
- Gorchymyn Deddf Addysg 2002 (Cychwyn Rhif 7) (Cymru) 2005 (S.I. 2005 Rhif 2910 (Cy.207) (C.124))
- The Annual Parents' Meeting (Exemptions) (Wales) Regulations 2005 (S.I. 2005 No. 2911 (W.208))
- Rheoliadau Cyfarfod Blynyddol Rhieni (Esemptiadau) (Cymru) 2005 (S.I. 2005 Rhif 2911 (Cy.208))
- The New Maintained Schools (Wales) Regulations 2005 (S.I. 2005 No. 2912 (W.209))
- Rheoliadau Ysgolion a Gynhelir Newydd (Cymru) 2005 (S.I. 2005 Rhif 2912 (Cy.209))
- The Education Act 2002 (Transitional Provisions and Consequential Amendments) (Wales) Regulations 2005 (S.I. 2005 No. 2913 (W.210))
- Rheoliadau Deddf Addysg 2002 (Darpariaethau Trosiannol a Diwygiadau Canlyniadol) (Cymru) 2005 (S.I. 2005 Rhif 2913 (Cy.210))
- The Government of Maintained Schools (Wales) Regulations 2005 (S.I. 2005 No. 2914 (W.211))
- Rheoliadau Llywodraethu Ysgolion a Gynhelir (Cymru) 2005 (S.I. 2005 Rhif 2914 (Cy.211))
- The Governor Allowances (Wales) Regulations 2005 (S.I. 2005 No. 2915 (W.212))
- Rheoliadau Lwfansau Llywodraethwyr (Cymru) 2005 (S.I. 2005 Rhif 2915 (Cy.212))
- The Change of Category of Maintained Schools (Wales) (Amendment) Regulations 2005 (S.I. 2005 No. 2916 (W.213))
- Rheoliadau Newid Categori Ysgolion a Gynhelir (Cymru) (Diwygio) 2005 (S.I. 2005 Rhif 2916 (Cy.213))
- The Immigration (Procedure for Formation of Civil Partnerships) Regulations 2005 (S.I. 2005 No. 2917)
- The Licensing Act 2003 (Permitted Temporary Activities) (Notices) Regulations 2005 (S.I. 2005 No. 2918)
- The Civil Partnership Act 2004 (Tax Credits, etc.) (Consequential Amendments) Order 2005 (S.I. 2005 No. 2919)
- The Dissolution etc. (Pensions) Regulations 2005 (S.I. 2005 No. 2920)
- The Family Proceedings (Civil Partnership: Staying of Proceedings) Rules 2005 (S.I. 2005 No. 2921 (L. 25))
- The Family Proceedings (Amendment) (No. 5) Rules 2005 (S.I. 2005 No. 2922 (L. 26))
- The Civil Courts (Amendment) Order 2005 (S.I. 2005 No. 2923)
- The Family Law Act 1996 (Part IV)(Allocation of Proceedings)(Amendment) Order 2005 (S.I. 2005 No. 2924)
- The Health and Social Care (Community Health and Standards) Act 2003 Commencement (No. 8) Order 2005 (S.I. 2005 No. 2925 (C.125))
- The National Health Service (Primary Care) Act 1997 (Commencement No.10) Order 2005 (S.I. 2005 No. 2926 (C. 126))
- The Salmonella in Broiler Flocks (Survey Powers) (England) Regulations 2005 (S.I. 2005 No. 2927)
- The A2 Trunk Road (Pepperhill to Cobham and Slip Roads) Supplementary Order 2005 (S.I. 2005 No 2928)
- The Fire and Rescue Services Act 2004 (Consequential Amendments) (Wales) Order 2005 (S.I. 2005 No. 2929 (W.214))
- Gorchymyn Deddf y Gwasanaethau Tân ac Achub 2004 (Diwygiadau Canlyniadol) (Cymru) 2005 (S.I. 2005 Rhif 2929 (Cy.214))
- The Magistrates' Courts (Miscellaneous Amendments) Rules 2005 (S.I. 2005 No. 2930 (L.27))
- The Cattewater Harbour Revision (Constitution) Order 2005 (S.I. 2005 No. 2932)
- The A2 Trunk Road (Pepperhill to Cobham and Slip Roads) Order 2005 (S.I. 2005 No 2933)
- The A2 Trunk Road (Pepperhill to Cobham) (Detrunking) Order 2005 (S.I. 2005 No 2934)
- The Town and Country Planning (General Permitted Development) (England) (Amendment) (No. 2) Order 2005 (S.I. 2005 No. 2935)
- The Local Justice Areas (No.2) Order 2005 (S.I. 2005 No. 2949)
- The Education (Listed Bodies) (England) (Amendment) (No. 2) Order 2005 (S.I. 2005 No. 2956)
- The Education (Recognised Bodies) (England) (Amendment) Order 2005 (S.I. 2005 No. 2957)
- The Energy Act 2004 (Commencement No. 6) Order 2005 (S.I. 2005 No. 2965 (C. 127))
- The Disability Discrimination (Public Authorities)(Statutory Duties) Regulations 2005 (S.I. 2005 No. 2966)
- The Financial Services and Markets Act 2000 (Consequential Amendments) Order 2005 (S.I. 2005 No. 2967)
- The Food Labelling (Amendment) (England) (No. 2) (Amendment) Regulations 2005 (S.I. 2005 No. 2969)
- The Medicines for Human Use (Fees Amendments)(No. 2) Regulations 2005 (S.I. 2005 No. 2979)
- The Firefighters' Pension Scheme (Amendment) (England) Order 2005 (S.I. 2005 No. 2980)
- The Vehicles Crime (Registration of Registration Plate Suppliers) (England and Wales) (Amendment) Regulations 2005 (S.I. 2005 No. 2981)
- The Meat (Official Controls Charges) (England) Regulations 2005 (S.I. 2005 No. 2983)
- The Avian Influenza (Preventive Measures in Zoos) (Wales) Regulations 2005 (S.I. 2005 No. 2984 (W.218))
- The Avian Influenza (Preventive Measures) (Wales) Regulations 2005 (S.I. 2005 No. 2985 (W.219))
- The Public Service Vehicles (Conditions of Fitness, Equipment, Use and Certification)(Amendment)(No. 3) Regulations 2005 (S.I. 2005 No. 2986)
- The Road Vehicles (Construction and Use) (Amendment) (No.3) Regulations 2005 (S.I. 2005 No. 2987)
- The Public Service Vehicles Accessibility (Amendment) Regulations 2005 (S.I. 2005 No. 2988)
- The Avian Influenza (Preventive Measures) Regulations 2005 (S.I. 2005 No. 2989)
- The Avian Influenza (Preventive Measures in Zoos) Regulations 2005 (S.I. 2005 No. 2990)
- The Fishery Products (Official Controls Charges) (England) Regulations 2005 (S.I. 2005 No. 2991)
- The Common Agricultural Policy (Wine) (England and Northern Ireland) (Amendment) Regulations 2005 (S.I. 2005 No. 2992)
- The Designation of Schools Having a Religious Character (Independent Schools) (England) (No.2) Order 2005 (S.I. 2005 No. 2993)

== 3001–3100 ==
- The Environmental Protection Act 1990 (Amendment of Section 57) (England and Wales) Regulations 2005 (S.I. 2005 No. 3026)
- The Licensing Act 2003 (Amendment of the Gaming Act 1968) (Transfer of Gaming Machine Permits) Order 2005 (S.I. 2005 No. 3027)
- The Licensing Act 2003 (Amendment of the Lotteries and Amusements Act 1976) (Transfer of Amusements With Prizes Permits) Order 2005 (S.I. 2005 No. 3028)
- The Civil Partnership (Miscellaneous and Consequential Provisions) Order 2005 (S.I. 2005 No. 3029)
- The Social Security (Inherited SERPS) (Amendments relating to Civil Partnership) Regulations 2005 (S.I. 2005 No. 3030)
- The Personal Injuries (Civilians) (Amendment) (No.3) Scheme 2005 (S.I. 2005 No. 3031)
- The War Pensions Committees (Amendment) Regulations 2005 (S.I. 2005 No. 3032)
- The War Pensions (Mercantile Marine) (Amendment) Scheme 2005 (S.I. 2005 No. 3033)
- The London — Fishguard Trunk Road (A40) (Combined Footpath/Cycleway, Windyhall, Fishguard) Order 2005 (S.I. 2005 No. 3034 (W.222))
- Gorchymyn Cefnffordd Llundain — Abergwaun (A40) (Troetffordd/Ffordd Feiciau Gyfun, Windyhall, Abergwaun) 2005 (S.I. 2005 Rhif 3034 (Cy.222))
- The Vegetable Seed (Wales) Regulations 2005 (S.I. 2005 No. 3035 (W.223))
- The Cereal Seed (Wales) Regulations 2005 (S.I. 2005 No. 3036 (W.224))
- The Beet Seed (Wales) Regulations 2005 (S.I. 2005 No. 3037 (W.225))
- The Seed (Registration, Licensing and Enforcement) (Wales) Regulations 2005 (S.I. 2005 No. 3038 (W.226))
- National Health Service (Appointment of Consultants) (Wales) (Amendment) Regulations 2005 (S.I. 2005 No. 3039 (W.227))
- Rheoliadau'r Gwasanaeth Iechyd Gwladol (Penodi Ymgynghorwyr) (Cymru) (Diwygio) 2005 (S.I. 2005 Rhif 3039 (Cy.227))
- The Pensions (Polish Forces) Scheme (Amendment) Order 2005 (S.I. 2005 No. 3040)
- The Electricity (Exemption from the Requirement for a Generation Licence) (Scotland) Order 2005 (S.I. 2005 No. 3041 (S.10))
- The Civil Partnership (Treatment of Overseas Relationships) Order 2005 (S.I. 2005 No. 3042)
- The North-West, Severn-Trent and Welsh Regional Flood Defence Committees (Boundaries Alteration) Order 2005 (S.I. 2005 No. 3047)
- The Licensing Act 2003 (Consequential Amendments) Order 2005 (S.I. 2005 No. 3048)
- The Railways Infrastructure (Access and Management) Regulations 2005 (S.I. 2005 No. 3049)
- The Railway (Licensing of Railway Undertakings) Regulations 2005 (S.I. 2005 No. 3050)
- The Bovine Products (Restriction on Placing on the Market) (Wales) Regulations 2005 (S.I. 2005 No. 3051 (W.228))
- Rheoliadau Cynhyrchion Buchol (Cyfyngu ar eu Rhoi ar y Farchnad) (Cymru) 2005 (S.I. 2005 Rhif 3051 (Cy.228))
- The Honey (Wales) (Amendment) Regulations 2005 (S.I. 2005 No. 3052 (W.229))
- Rheoliadau Mêl (Cymru) (Diwygio) 2005 (S.I. 2005 Rhif 3052 (Cy.229))
- The Drugs Act 2005 (Commencement No. 3) Order 2005 (S.I. 2005 No. 3053(C. 128))
- The Criminal Justice and Court Services Act 2000 (Commencement No. 15) Order 2005 (S.I. 2005 No. 3054 (C. 129))
- The Criminal Justice Act 2003 (Commencement No. 11) Order 2005 (S.I. 2005 No. 3055 (C. 130 ))
- The Licensing Act 2003 (Commencement No. 7 and Transitional Provisions) Order 2005 (S.I. 2005 No. 3056 (C.131))
- The Weights and Measures (Miscellaneous Foods) (Amendment) Order 2005 (S.I. 2005 No. 3057)
- The Civil Partnership Act 2004 (Commencement No. 2) (Northern Ireland) Order 2005 (S.I. 2005 No. 3058 (C. 132))
- The Social Fund Maternity and Funeral Expenses (General) Regulations 2005 (S.I. 2005 No. 3061)
- The Bovine Products (Restriction on Placing on the Market) (England) (No. 2) Regulations 2005 (S.I. 2005 No. 3068)
- The Local Government Pension Scheme (Civil Partnership) (Amendment) (England and Wales) Regulations 2005 (S.I. 2005 No. 3069)
- The Vaccine Damage Payments (Amendment) Regulations 2005 (S.I. 2005 No. 3070)
- The Financial Services and Markets Act 2000 (Disclosure of Confidential Information) (Amendment) Regulations 2005 (S.I. 2005 No. 3071)
- The National Health Service (Pension Scheme, Injury Benefits, Additional Voluntary Contributions and Compensation for Premature Retirement) (Civil Partnership) Amendment Regulations 2005 (S.I. 2005 No. 3074)
- The Water Supply (Exceptions from Supply System Prohibitions) Regulations 2005 (S.I. 2005 No. 3075)
- The Water Supply Licence (New Customer Exception) Regulations 2005 (S.I. 2005 No. 3076)
- The Water Supply Licence (Prescribed Water Fittings Requirements) Regulations 2005 (S.I. 2005 No. 3077)
- The Social Security (Retirement Pensions and Graduated Retirement Benefit) (Widowers and Civil Partnership) Regulations 2005 (S.I. 2005 No. 3078)
- The North Area College (Dissolution) Order 2005 (S.I. 2005 No. 3097)
- The Films (Exclusivity Agreements) (Revocation) Order 2005 (S.I. 2005 No. 3098)
- The Sheep and Goats (Records, Identification and Movement) (England) Order 2005 (S.I. 2005 No. 3100)

== 3101–3200 ==
- The Education (Information About Individual Pupils) (England) (Amendment) Regulations 2005 (S.I. 2005 No. 3101)
- The Haringey London Borough Council (Temporary Governing Body) Order 2005 (S.I. 2005 No. 3102)
- The Monopolies and Restrictive Practices (Dental Goods), (Imported Hardwood and Softwood Timber) and (Estate Agents) (Revocation) Order 2005 (S.I. 2005 No. 3103)
- The Civil Partnership (Supplementary Provisions relating to the Recognition of Overseas Dissolutions, Annulments or Legal Separations) (England and Wales and Northern Ireland) Regulations 2005 (S.I. 2005 No. 3104)
- Docklands Light Railway (Capacity Enhancement) Order 2005 (S.I. 2005 No. 3105)
- The National Police Records (Recordable Offences) (Amendment) Regulations 2005 (S.I. 2005 No. 3106)
- The Armed Forces (Pensions and Compensation) Act 2004 (Commencement No. 3) Order 2005 (S.I. 2005 No. 3107 (C.133))
- The Education (Free School Lunches) (State Pension Credit) (Wales) Order 2005 (S.I. 2005 No. 3110 (W.230))
- Gorchymyn Addysg (Ciniawau Ysgol am Ddim) (Credyd Pensiwn y Wladwriaeth) (Cymru) 2005 (S.I. 2005 Rhif 3110 (Cy.230))
- The Tryptophan in Food (Wales) Regulations 2005 (S.I. 2005 No. 3111 (W.231))
- Rheoliadau Tryptoffan mewn Bwyd (Cymru) 2005 (S.I. 2005 Rhif 3111 (Cy.231))
- The Adoption and Children Act 2002 (Commencement No. 11)(Wales) Order 2005 (S.I. 2005 No. 3112 (W.232) (C.134))
- Gorchymyn Deddf Mabwysiadu a Phlant 2002 (Cychwyn Rhif 11)(Cymru) 2005 (S.I. 2005 Rhif 3112 (Cy.232) (C.134))
- The Local Authority (Non-agency Adoptions) (Wales) Regulations 2005 (S.I. 2005 No. 3113 (W.233))
- Rheoliadau Awdurdodau Lleol (Mabwysiadau heb fod drwy Asiantaeth) (Cymru) 2005 (S.I. 2005 Rhif 3113 (Cy.233))
- Local Authorities (Prescribed Fees) (Adoptions with a Foreign Element) (Wales) Regulations 2005 (S.I. 2005 No. 3114 (W.234))
- Rheoliadau Awdurdodau Lleol (Ffioedd Rhagnodedig) (Mabwysiadu gydag Elfen Dramor) (Cymru) 2005 (S.I. 2005 Rhif 3114 (Cy.234))
- The Local Authority Adoption Service (Wales) Regulations 2005 (S.I. 2005 No. 3115 (W.235))
- Rheoliadau Gwasanaeth Mabwysiadu Awdurdodau Lleol (Cymru) 2005 (S.I. 2005 Rhif 3115 (Cy.235))
- The Enduring Powers of Attorney (Prescribed Form) (Amendment) Regulations 2005 (S.I. 2005 No. 3116)
- The Offshore Installations (Safety Case) Regulations 2005 (S.I. 2005 No. 3117)
- The Reserve Forces (Provision of Information by Persons Liable to be Recalled) (Amendment) Regulations 2005 (S.I. 2005 No. 3118)
- The Blackpool Airport Licensing (Liquor) Order 2005 (S.I. 2005 No. 3119)
- The Enduring Powers of Attorney (Welsh Language Prescribed Form) Regulations 2005 (S.I. 2005 No. 3125)
- The Court of Protection (Enduring Powers of Attorney) (Amendment No. 2) Rules 2005 (S.I. 2005 No. 3126)
- The Immigration (Provision of Physical Data) (Amendment) Regulations 2005 (S.I. 2005 No. 3127)
- The Public Service Vehicles (Conditions of Fitness, Equipment, Use and Certification) (Amendment) (No. 4) Regulations 2005 (S.I. 2005 No. 3128)
- The Civil Partnership Act 2004 (Overseas Relationships and Consequential, etc. Amendments) Order 2005 (S.I. 2005 No. 3129)
- The Social Security (Contributions) (Amendment No. 6) Regulations 2005 (S.I. 2005 No. 3130)
- The Social Security Contributions (Intermediaries) (Amendment) Regulations 2005 (S.I. 2005 No. 3131)
- The Social Security Contributions (Intermediaries) (Northern Ireland) (Amendment) Regulations 2005 (S.I. 2005 No. 3132)
- The Social Security (Categorisation of Earners) (Amendment) Regulations 2005 (S.I. 2005 No. 3133)
- The Social Security (Categorisation of Earners) (Amendment) (Northern Ireland) Regulations 2005 (S.I. 2005 No. 3134)
- The Civil Partnership Act 2004 (Overseas Relationships) Order 2005 (S.I. 2005 No. 3135)
- The Serious Organised Crime and Police Act 2005 (Commencement No.3) Order 2005 (S.I. 2005 No. 3136(C.135))
- The Civil Partnership Act 2004 (Relationships Arising Through Civil Partnership) Order 2005 (S.I. 2005 No. 3137)
- The Forensic Science Service Trading Fund (Revocation) Order 2005 (S.I. 2005 No. 3138)
- East Somerset Railway Order 2005 (S.I. 2005 No. 3143)
- The Renewable Energy Zone (Designation of Area) (Scottish Ministers) Order 2005 (S.I. 2005 No. 3153)
- The Occupational Pensions (Revaluation) Order 2005 (S.I. 2005 No. 3156)
- The Occupational and Personal Pension Schemes (Civil Partnership) (Miscellaneous Amendments) Regulations 2005 (S.I. 2005 No. 3164)
- The Road Vehicles (Construction and Use)(Amendment)(No. 4) Regulations 2005 (S.I. 2005 No. 3165)
- The Collection of Fines (Pilot Schemes) (Amendment No. 4) Order 2005 (S.I. 2005 No. 3166)
- The Registration of Civil Partnerships (Fees) (No. 2) Order 2005 (S.I. 2005 No. 3167)
- The Marriages and Civil Partnerships (Approved Premises) Regulations 2005 (S.I. 2005 No. 3168)
- The Road Vehicles Lighting (Amendment) (No. 2) Regulations 2005 (S.I. 2005 No. 3169)
- The Road Vehicles (Construction and Use)(Amendment)(No. 5) Regulations 2005 (S.I. 2005 No. 3170)
- The Superannuation (Admission to Schedule 1 to the Superannuation Act 1972) Order 2005 (S.I. 2005 No. 3171)
- The Water Services etc. (Scotland) Act 2005 (Consequential Provisions and Modifications) Order 2005 (S.I. 2005 No. 3172)
- The Birmingham City Council (Selly Oak New Road Tunnel) Scheme 2004 Confirmation Instrument 2005 (S.I. 2005 No. 3173)
- The Reporting of Suspicious Civil Partnerships Regulations 2005 (S.I. 2005 No. 3174)
- The Civil Partnership Act 2004 (Commencement No. 2) Order 2005 (S.I. 2005 No. 3175 (C.136))
- The Civil Partnership (Registration Provisions) Regulations 2005 (S.I. 2005 No. 3176)
- The Registration of Births, Deaths and Marriages (Amendment) Regulations 2005 (S.I. 2005 No. 3177)
- The Misuse of Drugs Act 1971 (Amendment) Order 2005 (S.I. 2005 No. 3178)
- The Criminal Justice (International Co-operation) Act 1990 (Enforcement of Overseas Forfeiture Orders) (Northern Ireland) Order 2005 (S.I. 2005 No. 3179)
- The Criminal Justice (International Co-operation) Act 1990 (Enforcement of Overseas Forfeiture Orders) Order 2005 (S.I. 2005 No. 3180)
- The Proceeds of Crime Act 2002 (External Requests and Orders) Order 2005 (S.I. 2005 No. 3181)
- The Consular Fees (Amendment) Order 2005 (S.I. 2005 No. 3182)
- The Overseas Territories (Zimbabwe) (Restrictive Measures) (Amendment) Order 2005 (S.I. 2005 No. 3183)
- The Navy and Marines (Property of Deceased) (Amendment) Order 2005 (S.I. 2005 No. 3184)
- The Naval Medical Compassionate Fund (Amendment) Order 2005 (S.I. 2005 No. 3185)
- The Service Departments Registers (Amendment) Order 2005 (S.I. 2005 No. 3186)
- The Naval, Military and Air Forces Etc. (Disablement and Death) Service Pensions (Amendment) (No. 3) Order 2005 (S.I. 2005 No. 3187)
- The Civil Partnership (Armed Forces) Order 2005 (S.I. 2005 No. 3188)
- The Ulster Defence Regiment (Amendment) Order 2005 (S.I. 2005 No. 3189)
- The Disability Discrimination (Transport Vehicles) Regulations 2005 (S.I. 2005 No. 3190)
- The Domestic Violence, Crime and Victims Act 2004 (Commencement No. 5) Order 2005 (S.I. 2005 No. 3196 (C.137))
- The Plant Protection Products (Amendment) Regulations 2005 (S.I. 2005 No. 3197)
- The Consular Fees Act 1980 (Fees) (No.2) Order 2005 (S.I. 2005 No. 3198)
- The Local Government Pension Scheme (Amendment) (No. 2) Regulations 2005 (S.I. 2005 No. 3199)
- The School Councils (Wales) Regulations 2005 (S.I. 2005 No. 3200 (W.236))
- Rheoliadau Cynghorau Ysgol (Cymru) 2005 (S.I. 2005 Rhif 3200 (Cy.236))

== 3201–3300 ==
- The Clergy Discipline Appeal Rules 2005 (S.I. 2005 No. 3201)
- The Payments to the Churches Conservation Trust Order 2005 (S.I. 2005 No. 3202)
- The Cash Ratio Deposits (Eligible Liabilities) (Amendment) Order 2005 (S.I. 2005 No. 3203)
- The Sports Grounds and Sporting Events (Designation) Order 2005 (S.I. 2005 No. 3204)
- The State Pension Credit (Amendment) Regulations 2005 (S.I. 2005 No. 3205)
- The West Suffolk Hospitals National Health Service Trust (Transfer of Trust Property) Order 2005 (S.I. 2005 No. 3206)
- The Channel Tunnel (International Arrangements) Order 2005 (S.I. 2005 No. 3207)
- The Housing Health and Safety Rating System (England) Regulations 2005 (S.I. 2005 No. 3208)
- The Disability Discrimination (Prescribed Times and Periods for Accessibility Strategies and Plans for Schools) (England) Regulations 2005 (S.I. 2005 No. 3221)
- The Electronic Commerce Directive (Adoption and Children Act 2002) Regulations 2005 (S.I. 2005 No. 3222)
- The Litter (Fixed Penalty Notices) Order 1991 and the Dog Fouling (Fixed Penalties) Order 1996 (Revocation) (England) Order 2005 (S.I. 2005 No. 3223)
- The Travel Concessions (Extension of Entitlement) (England) Order 2005 (S.I. 2005 No. 3224)
- The Wales Tourist Board (Transfer of Functions to the National Assembly for Wales and Abolition) Order 2005 (S.I. 2005 No. 3225 (W.237))
- Gorchymyn Bwrdd Croeso Cymru (Trosglwyddo Swyddogaethau i Gynulliad Cenedlaethol Cymru a Diddymu'r Bwrdd) 2005 (S.I. 2005 Rhif 3225 (Cy.237))
- The Welsh Development Agency (Transfer of Functions to the National Assembly for Wales and Abolition) Order 2005 (S.I. 2005 No. 3226 (W.238))
- Gorchymyn Awdurdod Datblygu Cymru (Trosglwyddo Swyddogaethau i Gynulliad Cenedlaethol Cymru a Diddymu) 2005 (S.I. 2005 Rhif 3226 (Cy.238))
- The Offshore Installations (Safety Zones) (No. 3) Order 2005 (S.I. 2005 No. 3227)
- The Firefighters' Pension Scheme (Civil Partnership Amendments) (England And Scotland) Order 2005 (S.I. 2005 No. 3228)
- The Tax and Civil Partnership Regulations 2005 (S.I. 2005 No. 3229)
- The Tax and Civil Partnership (No. 2) Regulations 2005 (S.I. 2005 No. 3230)
- The Transport for London (Woodside Park Substation) Order 2005 (S.I. 2005 No. 3231)
- The Transport for London (High Barnet Substation) Order 2005 (S.I. 2005 No. 3232)
- The New Opportunities Fund (Specification of Initiatives) (No.2) Order 2005 (S.I. 2005 No. 3235)
- The Food Labelling (Amendment) (Wales) (No. 2) (Amendment) Regulations 2005 (S.I. 2005 No. 3236 (W.241))
- Rheoliadau Labelu Bwyd (Diwygio) (Cymru) (Rhif 2) (Diwygio) 2005 (S.I. 2005 Rhif 3236 (Cy.241))
- The Housing Act 2004 (Commencement No. 2) (Wales) Order 2005 (S.I. 2005 No. 3237 (W.242) (C.138))
- Gorchymyn Deddf Tai 2004 (Cychwyn Rhif 2) (Cymru) 2005 (S.I. 2005 Rhif 3237 (Cy.242) (C.138))
- The National Council for Education and Training for Wales (Transfer of Functions to the National Assembly for Wales and Abolition) Order 2005 (S.I. 2005 No. 3238 (W.243))
- Gorchymyn Cyngor Cenedlaethol Cymru dros Addysg a Hyfforddiant (Trosglwyddo Swyddogaethau i Gynulliad Cenedlaethol Cymru a Diddymu'r Cyngor) 2005 (S.I. 2005 Rhif 3238 (Cy.243))
- The Qualifications, Curriculum and Assessment Authority for Wales (Transfer of Functions to the National Assembly for Wales and Abolition) Order 2005 (S.I. 2005 No. 3239 (W.244))
- Gorchymyn Awdurdod Cymwysterau, Cwricwlwm ac Asesu Cymru (Trosglwyddo Swyddogaethau i Gynulliad Cenedlaethol Cymru a Diddymu'r Awdurdod) 2005 (S.I. 2005 Rhif 3239 (Cy.244))
- The Veterinary Surgeons (Examination of Commonwealth and Foreign Candidates) Regulations Order of Council 2005 (S.I. 2005 No. 3240)
- The Contaminants in Food (England) Regulations 2005 (S.I. 2005 No. 3251)
- The Removal and Disposal of Vehicles (Amendment) (Wales) Regulations 2005 (S.I. 2005 No. 3252 (W.245))
- Rheoliadau Symud Ymaith a Gwaredu Cerbydau (Diwygio) (Cymru) 2005 (S.I. 2005 Rhif 3252 (Cy.245))
- The Official Feed and Food Controls (Wales) Regulations 2005 (S.I. 2005 No. 3254 (W.247))
- Rheoliadau Rheolaethau Swyddogol ar Fwyd Anifeiliaid a Bwyd (Cymru) 2005 (S.I. 2005 Rhif 3254 (Cy.247))
- The Civil Partnership Act 2004 (Commencement No. 3) (Northern Ireland) Order 2005 (S.I. 2005 No. 3255 (C. 139))
- The Financial Assistance Scheme (Modifications and Miscellaneous Amendments) Regulations 2005 (S.I. 2005 No. 3256)
- The Export Control (Uzbekistan) Order 2005 (S.I. 2005 No. 3257)
- The Disability Discrimination (Private Clubs etc.) Regulations 2005 (S.I. 2005 No. 3258)
- The Medicines (Pharmacies) (Applications for Registration and Fees) Amendment Regulations 2005 (S.I. 2005 No. 3259)
- The Railways (Accident Investigation and Reporting) (Amendment) Regulations 2005 (S.I. 2005 No. 3261)
- The Healthy Start Scheme and Welfare Food (Amendment) Regulations 2005 (S.I. 2005 No. 3262)
- The Financial Assistance Scheme (Appeals) Regulations 2005 (S.I. 2005 No. 3273)
- The Parks for People (England) Joint Scheme (Authorisation) Order 2005 (S.I. 2005 No. 3274)
- The Family Procedure (Modification of Enactments) Order 2005 (S.I. 2005 No. 3275)
- The Access to Justice Act 1999 (Destination of Appeals) (Family Proceedings) Order 2005 (S.I. 2005 No. 3276 (L.28))
- The National Assistance (Assessment of Resources) (Amendment) (England) Regulations 2005 (S.I. 2005 No. 3277)
- The Feed (Hygiene and Enforcement) (England) Regulations 2005 (S.I. 2005 No. 3280)
- The Feeding Stuffs (England) Regulations 2005 (S.I. 2005 No. 3281)
- The Civil Partnership (Treatment of Overseas Relationships No.2) Order 2005 (S.I. 2005 No. 3284)
- The Health and Social Care (Community Health and Standards) Act 2003 Commencement (Wales) (No. 3) Order 2005 (S.I. 2005 No. 3285 (W.249) (C.140))
- Gorchymyn Cychwyn Deddf Iechyd a Gofal Cymdeithasol (Iechyd Cymunedol a Safonau) 2003 (Rhif 3) (Cymru) 2005 (S.I. 2005 Rhif 3285 (Cy.249) (C.140))
- The Pesticides (Maximum Residue Levels in Crops, Food and Feeding Stuffs) (England and Wales) Regulations 2005 (S.I. 2005 No. 3286)
- The Education (Recognised Bodies) (Wales) Order 2005 (S.I. 2005 No. 3287 (W.250))
- Gorchymyn Addysg (Cyrff sy'n Cael eu Cydnabod)(Cymru) 2005 (S.I. 2005 Rhif 3287 (Cy.250))
- The National Assistance (Assessment of Resources) (Amendment No. 2) (Wales) Regulations 2005 (S.I. 2005 No. 3288 (W.251))
- Rheoliadau Cymorth Gwladol (Asesu Adnoddau) (Diwygio Rhif 2) (Cymru) 2005 (S.I. 2005 Rhif 3288 (Cy.251))
- The General Insurance Reserves (Tax) (Amendment) Regulations 2005 (S.I. 2005 No. 3289)
- The Value Added Tax (Input Tax) (Reimbursement by Employers of Employees' Business Use of Road Fuel) Regulations 2005 (S.I. 2005 No. 3290)
- The Value Added Tax (Input Tax) (Person Supplied) Order 2005 (S.I. 2005 No. 3291)
- The Food Hygiene (Wales) Regulations 2005 (S.I. 2005 No. 3292 (W.252))
- Rheoliadau Hylendid Bwyd (Cymru) 2005 (S.I. 2005 Rhif 3292 (Cy.252))
- The Adoption Information and Intermediary Services (Pre-Commencement Adoptions) (Wales) (Amendment) Regulations 2005 (S.I. 2005 No. 3293 (W.253))
- Rheoliadau Gwybodaeth Mabwysiadu a Gwasanaethau Cyfryngol (Mabwysiadu Cyn-gychwyn) (Cymru) (Diwygio) 2005 (S.I. 2005 Rhif 3293 (Cy.253))
- The Housing Benefit and Council Tax Benefit (Miscellaneous Amendments) (No.5) Regulations 2005 (S.I. 2005 No. 3294)
- The Road Traffic (Permitted Parking Area and Special Parking Area) (County of Hampshire) (District of New Forest) Order 2005 (S.I. 2005 No. 3295)
- The Bovine Products (Restriction on Placing on the Market) (Wales) (No.2) Regulations 2005 (S.I. 2005 No. 3296 (W.254))
- Rheoliadau Cynhyrchion Buchol (Cyfyngu ar eu Rhoi ar y Farchnad) (Cymru) (Rhif 2) 2005 (S.I. 2005 Rhif 3296 (Cy.254))
- The Fishery Products (Official Controls Charges) (Wales) Regulations 2005 (S.I. 2005 No. 3297 (W.255))
- Rheoliadau Cynhyrchion Pysgodfeydd (Taliadau Rheolaethau Swyddogol) (Cymru) 2005 (S.I. 2005 Rhif 3297 (Cy.255))
- The Civil Partnership (House of Commons Members' Fund) Order 2005 (S.I. 2005 No. 3298)
- The Schools Forums (England) (Amendment) Regulations 2005 (S.I. 2005 No. 3299)
- The Cowley St.Laurence CE Primary School (Designation as having a Religious Character) Order 2005 (S.I. 2005 No. 3300)

== 3301–3400 ==
- The Herdley Bank Church of England Aided First School (Designation as having a Religious Character) Order 2005 (S.I. 2005 No. 3301)
- The Civil Partnership Act 2004 (Consequential Amendments to Subordinate Legislation) (Wales) Order 2005 (S.I. 2005 No. 3302 (W.256))
- Gorchymyn Deddf Partneriaeth Sifil 2004 (Diwygiadau Canlyniadol i Is-ddeddfwriaeth) (Cymru) 2005 (S.I. 2005 Rhif 3302 (Cy.256))
- The St Peter's Catholic Primary School (Designation as having a Religious Character) Order 2005 (S.I. 2005 No. 3303)
- The Trinity, St Peter's CE Primary School (Designation as having a Religious Character) Order 2005 (S.I. 2005 No. 3304)
- The Asylum (Designated States) (No. 2) Order 2005 (S.I. 2005 No. 3306)
- The Approval of Code of Management Practice (Private Retirement Housing) (England) Order 2005 (S.I. 2005 No. 3307)
- The Royal Patriotic Fund Corporation (Transfer of Property, Rights and Liabilities) Order 2005 (S.I. 2005 No. 3308)
- The Education (Teacher Student Loans) (Repayment etc.) (Amendment) Regulations 2005 (S.I. 2005 No. 3309)
- The Immigration (Designation of Travel Bans) (Amendment) Order 2005 (S.I. 2005 No. 3310)
- The Revenue and Customs (Complaints and Misconduct) Regulations 2005 (S.I. 2005 No. 3311)
- The Yesodey Hatorah School (Designation as having a Religious Character) Order 2005 (S.I. 2005 No. 3313)
- The Vine Inter-Church Primary School (Designation as having a Religious Character) Order 2005 (S.I. 2005 No. 3314)
- The National Health Service (Primary Medical Services) (Miscellaneous Amendments) (No. 2) Regulations 2005 (S.I. 2005 No. 3315)
- The Hydrocarbon Oil Duties (Reliefs for Electricity Generation) Regulations 2005 (S.I. 2005 No. 3320)
- The Social Security (Electronic Communications) (Miscellaneous Benefits) Order 2005 (S.I. 2005 No. 3321)
- The Education (Head Teachers' Qualifications) (England) (Amendment) (No. 2) Regulations 2005 (S.I. 2005 No. 3322)
- The Housing Renewal Grants (Amendment) (England) Regulations 2005 (S.I. 2005 No. 3323)
- The Medicines for Human Use (Prescribing) (Miscellaneous Amendments) (No. 2) Order 2005 (S.I. 2005 No. 3324)
- The Civil Partnership (Judicial Pensions and Church Pensions, etc.) Order 2005 (S.I. 2005 No. 3325)
- The Housing Renewal Grants (Prescribed Form and Particulars) (Amendment) (England) Regulations 2005 (S.I. 2005 No. 3326)
- The Income Tax (Indexation) (No.2) Order 2005 (S.I. 2005 No. 3327)
- The Value Added Tax (Betting, Gaming and Lotteries) Order 2005 (S.I. 2005 No. 3328)
- The Value Added Tax (Reduced Rate) (No. 2) Order 2005 (S.I. 2005 No. 3329)
- The Excise Duties (Surcharges or Rebates) (Hydrocarbon Oils etc.) (Amendment) Order 2005 (S.I. 2005 No. 3330)
- The Pensions Act 2004 (Commencement No. 8) Order 2005 (S.I. 2005 No. 3331 (C. 141))
- The Independent Review of Determinations (Adoption) Regulations 2005 (S.I. 2005 No. 3332)
- The Non-Domestic Rating Contributions (Amendment) (England) Regulations 2005 (S.I. 2005 No. 3333)
- The Civil Partnership (Jurisdiction and Recognition of Judgments) Regulations 2005 (S.I. 2005 No. 3334)
- The Retention of Communications Data (Further Extension of Initial Period) Order 2005 (S.I. 2005 No. 3335)
- The Civil Partnership (Family Proceedings and Housing Consequential Amendments) Order 2005 (S.I. 2005 No. 3336)
- The Finance (No. 2) Act 2005, Section 45, (Appointed Day) Order 2005 (S.I. 2005 No. 3337 (C.142))
- The Lloyd's Underwriters (Tax) Regulations 2005 (S.I. 2005 No. 3338)
- The Local Authority Adoption Service (England) (Amendment) Regulations 2005 (S.I. 2005 No. 3339)
- The Disability Discrimination Code of Practice (Public Authorities) (Duty to Promote Equality) (Appointed Day) Order 2005 (S.I. 2005 No. 3340)
- The Voluntary Adoption Agencies (Amendment) Regulations 2005 (S.I. 2005 No. 3341)
- The Education (School Organisation Proposals) (Amendment) (No 2) (England) Regulations 2005 (S.I. 2005 No. 3342)
- The Crime and Disorder Act 1998 (Responsible Authorities) (No. 2) Order 2005 (S.I. 2005 No. 3343)
- The Firearms (Amendment) Rules 2005 (S.I. 2005 No. 3344)
- The Non-Domestic Rating Contributions (Wales) (Amendment) Regulations 2005 (S.I. 2005 No. 3345 (W.259))
- Rheoliadau Cyfraniadau Ardrethu Annomestig (Cymru) (Diwygio) 2005 (S.I. 2005 Rhif 3345 (Cy.259))
- The Cosmetic Products (Safety) (Amendment) (No. 2) Regulations 2005 (S.I. 2005 No. 3346)
- The Competition Act 1998 (Public Transport Ticketing Schemes Block Exemption) (Amendment) Order 2005 (S.I. 2005 No. 3347)
- The Personal Equity Plan (Amendment No. 2) Regulations 2005 (S.I. 2005 No. 3348)
- The Child Trust Funds (Amendment No. 3) Regulations 2005 (S.I. 2005 No. 3349)
- The Individual Savings Account (Amendment No. 3) Regulations 2005 (S.I. 2005 No. 3350)
- The Public Lending Right Scheme 1982 (Commencement of Variation) (No. 2) Order 2005 (S.I. 2005 No. 3351)
- The Employment Rights (Increase of Limits) Order 2005 (S.I. 2005 No. 3352)
- The Nursing and Midwifery Council (Fees) (Amendment) Rules Order of Council 2005 (S.I. 2005 No. 3353)
- The Nursing and Midwifery Council (Education, Registration and Registration Appeals) (Amendment) Rules Order of Council 2005 (S.I. 2005 No. 3354)
- The Biofuel (Labelling) (Amendment) Regulations 2005 (S.I. 2005 No. 3355)
- The Air Navigation (Dangerous Goods) (Amendment) Regulations 2005 (S.I. 2005 No. 3356)
- The Non-Contentious Probate Fees (London Terrorist Bombings) Order 2005 (S.I. 2005 No. 3359)
- The Social Security (Hospital In-Patients) Regulations 2005 (S.I. 2005 No. 3360)
- The National Health Service (General Dental Services Contracts) Regulations 2005 (S.I. 2005 No. 3361)
- The Feeding Stuffs (Application to Zootechnical Additives etc.) (Scotland) Regulations 2005 (S.I. 2005 No.3362(S.11))
- The Children Act 2004 (Commencement No. 5) (Wales) Order 2005 (S.I. 2005 No. 3363 (C.260) (W.143))
- Gorchymyn Deddf Plant 2004 (Cychwyn Rhif 5) (Cymru) 2005 (S.I. 2005 Rhif 3363 (C.260) (Cy.143))
- The Valuation Tribunals (Wales) Regulations 2005 (S.I. 2005 No. 3364 (W.261))
- Rheoliadau Tribiwnlysoedd Prisio (Cymru) 2005 (S.I. 2005 Rhif 3364 (Cy.261))
- The Representations Procedure (Children) (Wales) Regulations 2005 (S.I. 2005 No. 3365 (W.262))
- Rheoliadau Gweithdrefn Sylwadau (Plant) (Cymru) 2005 (S.I. 2005 Rhif 3365 (Cy.262))
- The Social Services Complaints Procedure (Wales) Regulations 2005 (S.I. 2005 No. 3366 (W.263))
- Rheoliadau Gweithdrefn Gwynion y Gwasanaethau Cymdeithasol (Cymru) 2005 (S.I. 2005 Rhif 3366 (Cy.263))
- The Common Agricultural Policy Single Payment and Support Schemes (Cross Compliance) (Wales) (Amendment) Regulations 2005 (S.I. 2005 No. 3367 (W.264))
- Rheoliadau Cynllun Taliad Sengl a Chynlluniau Cymorth y Polisi Amaethyddol Cyffredin (Trawsgydymffurfio) (Cymru) (Diwygio) 2005 (S.I. 2005 Rhif 3367 (Cy.264))
- The Feed (Hygiene and Enforcement) (Wales) Regulations 2005 (S.I. 2005 No. 3368 (W.265))
- Rheoliadau Bwyd Anifeiliaid (Hylendid a Gorfodi) (Cymru) 2005 (S.I. 2005 Rhif 3368 (Cy.265))
- The Meat (Official Controls) (Charges) (Wales) Regulations 2005 (S.I. 2005 No. 3370 (W.267))
- Rheoliadau Cig (Rheolaethau Swyddogol) (Ffioedd) (Cymru) 2005 (S.I. 2005 Rhif 3370 (Cy.267))
- The Statistics of Trade (Customs and Excise) (Amendment) Regulations 2005 (S.I. 2005 No. 3371)
- The Misuse of Drugs (Amendment) (No. 3) Regulations 2005 (S.I. 2005 No. 3372)
- The National Health Service (Personal Dental Services Agreements) Regulations 2005 (S.I. 2005 No. 3373)
- The Loan Relationships and Derivative Contracts (Disregard and Bringing into Account of Profits and Losses) (Amendment No. 2) Regulations 2005 (S.I. 2005 No. 3374)
- The Overseas Life Insurance Companies (Amendment) Regulations 2005 (S.I. 2005 No. 3375)
- The Research and Development Tax Relief (Definition of Small or Medium-Sized Enterprise) Order 2005 (S.I. 2005 No. 3376)
- The Occupational Pension Schemes (Scheme Funding) Regulations 2005 (S.I. 2005 No. 3377)
- The Occupational Pension Schemes (Investment) Regulations 2005 (S.I. 2005 No. 3378)
- The Occupational Pension Schemes (Internal Controls) Regulations 2005 (S.I. 2005 No. 3379)
- The Occupational Pension Schemes (Regulatory Own Funds) Regulations 2005 (S.I. 2005 No. 3380)
- The Occupational Pension Schemes (Cross-border Activities) Regulations 2005 (S.I. 2005 No. 3381)
- The Proceeds of Crime Act 2002 (Legal Expenses in Civil Recovery Proceedings) Regulations 2005 (S.I. 2005 No. 3382)
- The Loan Relationships and Derivative Contracts (Change of Accounting Practice) (Amendment) Regulations 2005 (S.I. 2005 No. 3383)
- The Avian Influenza (Preventive Measures) (Wales) (No. 2) Regulations 2005 (S.I. 2005 No. 3384 (W.268))
- The Avian Influenza (Preventive Measures in Zoos) (Wales) (No. 2) Regulations 2005 (S.I. 2005 No. 3385 (W.269))
- The Products of Animal Origin (Third Country Imports) (England) (No. 4) (Amendment) Regulations 2005 (S.I. 2005 No. 3386)
- The Designation of Schools Having a Religious Character (Independent Schools) (England) (No. 3) Order 2005 (S.I. 2005 No. 3388)
- The Serious Organised Crime and Police Act 2005 (Powers of Arrest) (Consequential Amendments) Order 2005 (S.I. 2005 No. 3389)
- The Local Authority (Adoption) (Miscellaneous Provisions) Regulations 2005 (S.I. 2005 No. 3390)
- The Income-related Benefits (Amendment) (No. 2) Regulations 2005 (S.I. 2005 No. 3391)
- The Financial Services and Markets Act 2000 (Financial Promotion) (Amendment) Order 2005 (S.I. 2005 No. 3392)
- The East Sussex County Healthcare National Health Service Trust (Transfer of Trust Property) Order 2005 (S.I. 2005 No. 3393)
- The Avian Influenza (Preventive Measures) (No 2) Regulations 2005 (S.I. 2005 No. 3394)
- The Products of Animal Origin (Third Country Imports) (Wales) (Amendment) Regulations 2005 (S.I. 2005 No. 3395 (W.271))
- The Victims of Violent Intentional Crime (Arrangements for Compensation) (European Communities) Regulations 2005 (S.I. 2005 No. 3396)
- The Care Standards Act 2000 (Commencement No. 9 (England) and Transitional and Savings Provisions) (Amendment) Order 2005 (S.I. 2005 No. 3397)

== 3401–3500 ==
- The Bus Lane Contraventions (Approved Local Authorities) (England) (Amendment) Order 2005 (S.I. 2005 No. 3406)
- The Road Traffic (Permitted Parking Area and Special Parking Area) (County of Surrey) (Borough of Elmbridge) Order 2005 (S.I. 2005 No. 3407)
- The Loan Relationships and Derivative Contracts (Exchange Gains and Losses using Fair Value Accounting) Regulations 2005 (S.I. 2005 No. 3422)
- The Legal Aid (Northern Ireland) Order 2005 (S.I. 2005 No. 3423 (N.I. 19))
- The Employment (Miscellaneous Provisions) (Northern Ireland) Order 2005 (S.I. 2005 No. 3424 (N.I. 20))
- The European Court of Human Rights (Immunities and Privileges) (Amendment) Order 2005 (S.I. 2005 No. 3425)
- The European Forest Institute (Legal Capacities) Order 2005 (S.I. 2005 No. 3426)
- The Education (Inspectors of Schools in England) (Amendment) Order 2005 (S.I. 2005 No. 3427)
- The Health Service Commissioner for England (Special Health Authorities) (No.2) Order 2005 (S.I. 2005 No. 3428)
- The Transfer of Functions (Lord Chancellor and Secretary of State) Order 2005 (S.I. 2005 No. 3429)
- The Parliamentary Commissioner (No. 2) Order 2005 (S.I. 2005 No. 3430)
- The European Communities (Definition of Treaties) (WIPO Copyright Treaty and WIPO Performances and Phonograms Treaty) Order 2005 (S.I. 2005 No. 3431)
- The Lebanon and Syria (United Nations Measures) Order 2005 (S.I. 2005 No. 3432)
- The Cattle Compensation (England) Order 2005 (S.I. 2005 No. 3433)
- The Individual Ascertainment of Value (England) Order 2005 (S.I. 2005 No. 3434)
- The General Dental Services and Personal Dental Services Transitional Provisions Order 2005 (S.I. 2005 No. 3435)
- The Education (Grants etc.) (Dance and Drama) (England) (Amendment) (No. 2) Regulations 2005 (S.I. 2005 No. 3436)
- The Prison (Amendment) (No. 2) Rules 2005 (S.I. 2005 No. 3437)
- The Young Offender Institution (Amendment) (No. 2) Rules 2005 (S.I. 2005 No. 3438)
- The Clean Neighbourhoods and Environment Act 2005 (Commencement No. 3) Order 2005 (S.I. 2005 No. 3439 (C. 144))
- The Finance Act 2002, Schedule 26 (Parts 2 and 9) (Amendment No. 3) Order 2005 (S.I. 2005 No. 3440)
- The Inheritance Tax (Double Charges Relief) Regulations 2005 (S.I. 2005 No. 3441)
- The Companies Act 1985 (Operating and Financial Review) (Repeal) Regulations 2005 (S.I. 2005 No. 3442)
- The Family Proceedings Fees (Amendment No. 2) Order 2005 (S.I. 2005 No. 3443 (L.29))
- The Magistrates' Courts Fees Order 2005 (S.I. 2005 No. 3444 (L.30))
- The Civil Proceedings Fees (Amendment) Order 2005 (S.I. 2005 No. 3445 (L. 31))
- The Tuberculosis (England) Order 2005 (S.I. 2005 No. 3446)
- The Serious Organised Crime and Police Act 2005 (Designated Sites) Order 2005 (S.I. 2005 No. 3447)
- The Registered Pension Schemes (Relief at Source) Regulations 2005 (S.I. 2005 No. 3448)
- The Registered Pension Schemes (Prescribed Interest Rates for Authorised Employer Loans) Regulations 2005 (S.I. 2005 No. 3449)
- The Registered Pension Schemes (Minimum Contributions) Regulations 2005 (S.I. 2005 No. 3450)
- The Registered Pension Schemes (Prescribed Schemes and Occupations) Regulations 2005 (S.I. 2005 No. 3451)
- The Registered Pension Schemes (Discharge of Liabilities under Sections 267 and 268 of the Finance Act 2004) Regulations 2005 (S.I. 2005 No. 3452)
- The Employer-Financed Retirement Benefits Schemes (Provision of Information) Regulations 2005 (S.I. 2005 No. 3453)
- The Registered Pension Schemes (Accounting and Assessment) Regulations 2005 (S.I. 2005 No. 3454)
- The Registered Pension Schemes and Employer-Financed Retirement Benefits Schemes (Information) (Prescribed Descriptions of Persons) Regulations 2005 (S.I. 2005 No. 3455)
- The Registered Pension Schemes (Audited Accounts) (Specified Persons) Regulations 2005 (S.I. 2005 No. 3456)
- The Taxes Management Act 1970 (Modifications to Schedule 3 for Pension Scheme Appeals) Order 2005 (S.I. 2005 No. 3457)
- The Registered Pension Schemes (Restriction of Employers' Relief) Regulations 2005 (S.I. 2005 No. 3458)
- The Common Agricultural Policy Single Payment and Support Schemes (Cross-compliance) (England) Regulations 2005 (S.I. 2005 No. 3459)
- The Common Agricultural Policy Single Payment Scheme (Set-aside) (England) (Amendment) Regulations 2005 (S.I. 2005 No. 3460)
- The Severn Bridges Tolls Order 2005 (S.I. 2005 No. 3461)
- The Children Act 2004 (Commencement No. 5) Order 2005 (S.I. 2005 No. 3464 (C.145))
- The Insurance Companies (Corporation Tax Acts) (Amendment) Order 2005 (S.I. 2005 No. 3465)
- The Jobseeker's Allowance (Jobseeker Mandatory Activity) Pilot Regulations 2005 (S.I. 2005 No. 3466)
- The Radioactive Contaminated Land (Enabling Powers) (England) Regulations 2005 (S.I. 2005 No. 3467)
- The Producer Responsibility Obligations (Packaging Waste) Regulations 2005 (S.I. 2005 No. 3468)
- The Communications Act 2003 (Maximum Penalty and Disclosure of Information) Order 2005 (S.I. 2005 No. 3469)
- The Parliamentary Elections (Welsh Forms) (Amendment) Order 2005 (S.I. 2005 No. 3470)
- The Wireless Telegraphy (Radio Frequency Identification Equipment) (Exemption) Regulations 2005 (S.I. 2005 No. 3471)
- The Hydrocarbon Oil (Registered Remote Markers) Regulations 2005 (S.I. 2005 No. 3472)
- The Farm Woodland Premium Schemes (Amendment) (England) Scheme 2005 (S.I. 2005 No. 3473)
- The Income Tax (Building Societies) (Dividends and Interest) (Amendment) Regulations 2005 (S.I. 2005 No. 3474)
- The Animal Health Act 1981 (Amendment) Regulations 2005 (S.I. 2005 No. 3475)
- The Social Security (Payments on account, Overpayments and Recovery) Amendment Regulations 2005 (S.I. 2005 No. 3476)
- The National Health Service (Dental Charges) Regulations 2005 (S.I. 2005 No. 3477)
- The Armed Forces Proceedings (Costs) Regulations 2005 (S.I. 2005 No. 3478)
- The Education (School Teachers' Pay and Conditions) (No.4) Order 2005 (S.I. 2005 No. 3479)
- The Plant Health (Export Certification) (England) (Amendment) Order 2005 (S.I. 2005 No. 3480)
- The Wireless Telegraphy (Inspection and Restrictions on Use of Exempt Stations and Apparatus) Regulations 2005 (S.I. 2005 No. 3481)
- The Adoption and Children (Miscellaneous Amendments) Regulations 2005 (S.I. 2005 No. 3482)
- The Courts-Martial (Army) (Amendment) Rules 2005 (S.I. 2005 No. 3483)
- The Courts-Martial (Royal Navy) (Amendment) Rules 2005 (S.I. 2005 No. 3484)
- The Courts-Martial (Royal Air Force) (Amendment) Rules 2005 (S.I. 2005 No. 3485)
- The Summary Appeal Court (Army) (Amendment) Rules 2005 (S.I. 2005 No. 3486)
- The Summary Appeal Court (Navy) (Amendment) Rules 2005 (S.I. 2005 No. 3487)
- The Summary Appeal Court (Air Force) (Amendment) Rules 2005 (S.I. 2005 No. 3488)
- The Derbyshire (Coroners' Districts) (Amendment) Order 2005 (S.I. 2005 No. 3489)
- The National Health Service (Performers Lists) Amendment Regulations 2005 (S.I. 2005 No. 3491)
- The Road Traffic (Permitted Parking Area and Special Parking Area) (County of West Sussex) (District of Horsham) Order 2005 (S.I. 2005 No. 3492)
- The Morecambe Bay Hospitals National Health Service Trust (Change of Name) (Establishment) Amendment Order 2005 (S.I. 2005 No. 3493)
- The Road Traffic (Permitted Parking Area and Special Parking Area) (County of West Sussex) (District of Mid Sussex) Order 2005 (S.I. 2005 No. 3494)
- The Serious Organised Crime and Police Act 2005 (Commencement No. 4 and Transitory Provision) Order 2005 (S.I. 2005 No. 3495 (C. 146))
- The Serious Organised Crime and Police Act 2005 (Amendment) Order 2005 (S.I. 2005 No. 3496)

== 3501–3600 ==
- The Police and Criminal Evidence Act 1984 (Codes of Practice) Order 2005 (S.I. 2005 No. 3503)
- The Adoption and Children Act 2002 (Consequential Amendments) Order 2005 (S.I. 2005 No. 3504)
- The Education (Chief Inspector of Schools in England) Order 2005 (S.I. 2005 No. 3505)
- The Port of London Authority (Constitution) Harbour Revision Order 2005 (S.I. 2005 No. 3514)
- The Civil Procedure (Amendment No.4) Rules 2005 (S.I. 2005 No. 3515 (L. 32))
- The A3 Trunk Road (Thursley Junction) (One Way Traffic) Order 2005 (S.I. 2005 No. 3516)
- The Veterinary Surgeons and Veterinary Practitioners (Registration) Regulations Order of Council 2005 (S.I. 2005 No. 3517)
- The Courts Act 2003 (Commencement No. 12 and Transitional Provision) Order 2005 (S.I. 2005 No. 3518 (C.147))
- The Older Cattle (Disposal) (England) Regulations 2005 (S.I. 2005 No. 3522)
- The Cambridgeshire Guided Busway Order 2005 (S.I. 2005 No. 3523)
- The Insolvency Practitioners and Insolvency Services Account (Fees) (Amendment) (No. 2) Order 2005 (S.I. 2005 No. 3524)
- The Noise Emission in the Environment by Equipment for Use Outdoors (Amendment) Regulations 2005 (S.I. 2005 No. 3525)
- The Civil Partnership Act 2004 (International Immunities and Privileges, Companies and Adoption) Order 2005 (S.I. 2005 No. 3542)
- The Road Traffic (Permitted Parking Area and Special Parking Area) (County of Hertfordshire) (Borough of Hertsmere) Order 2005 (S.I. 2005 No. 3543)
- The Enterprise Act 2002 (Merger Fees) (Amendment) Order 2005 (S.I. 2005 No. 3558)
- The Freedom of Information (Additional Public Authorities) Order 2005 (S.I. 2005 No. 3593)
- The Freedom of Information (Removal of References to Public Authorities) Order 2005 (S.I. 2005 No. 3594)
- The Register of Judgments, Orders and Fines Regulations 2005 (S.I. 2005 No. 3595)

== 3601–3700 ==
- The North Level Internal Drainage Board Order 2005 (S.I. 2005 No. 3601)

== See also ==
- List of statutory instruments of the United Kingdom
