= Piracy =

Acts of robbery or criminality at sea

The traditional "Jolly Roger" flag of 18th century Western piracy

Piracy is an act of robbery or criminal violence by ship or boat-borne attackers upon another ship or a coastal area, typically intending to steal cargo and valuable goods, or take hostages. Those who conduct acts of piracy are called pirates, and vessels used for piracy are called pirate ships. The earliest documented instances of piracy date to the 14th century BC, when the Sea Peoples, a group of ocean raiders, attacked the ships of the Aegean and Mediterranean civilizations. Narrow channels which funnel shipping into predictable routes have long created opportunities for piracy, as well as for privateering and commerce raiding.

Historic examples of such areas include the waters of Gibraltar, the Strait of Malacca, Madagascar, the Gulf of Aden, and the English Channel, whose geographic structures facilitated pirate attacks. The term piracy generally refers to maritime piracy, although the term has been generalized to refer to acts committed on land, in the air, on computer networks, and (in science fiction) outer space. Piracy usually excludes crimes committed by the perpetrator on their own vessel (e.g., theft) as well as privateering, which implies authorization by a state government.

Piracy, or pirating, is the name of a specific crime under customary international law and also of many crimes under the municipal law of many states. In the 21st century, seaborne piracy against transport vessels remains a significant issue, with estimated worldwide losses of US$25 billion in 2023, increased from US$16 billion in 2004.

The waters between the Red Sea and the Indian Ocean, off the Somali coast and in the Strait of Malacca and Singapore have frequently been targeted by modern pirates armed with automatic firearms and occasionally explosive weaponry. They often use small motorboats to attack and board ships, a tactic that exploits the limited crew sizes on modern cargo and transport vessels. The international community is facing many challenges in bringing modern pirates to justice, as these attacks often occur in international waters. Nations have used their naval forces to repel and pursue pirates, and some private vessels use armed security guards, high-pressure water cannons, or sound cannons to repel boarders, and use radar to avoid potential threats.

Romanticized accounts of piracy during the Age of Sail have long been a part of Western pop culture. The two-volume A General History of the Pyrates, published in London in 1724, is generally credited with bringing key piratical figures and a semi-accurate description of their milieu in the "Golden Age of Piracy" to the public's imagination. A General History inspired and informed many later fictional depictions of piracy, most notably the novels Treasure Island (1883) and Peter Pan (1911), both of which have been adapted and readapted for stage, film, television, and other media across over a century. More recently, pirates of the "golden age" were further stereotyped and popularized by the Pirates of the Caribbean film franchise, which began in 2003.

== Etymology ==
The English word "pirate" is derived from the Latin pirata ("pirate, corsair, sea robber"), which comes from Greek πειρατής (peiratēs), "brigand", from πειράομαι (peiráomai), "I attempt", from πεῖρα (peîra), "attempt, experience". The meaning of the Greek word peiratēs literally is "anyone who attempts something". Over time, it came to be used to describe anyone who committed robbery or brigandage on land or at sea. The term first appeared in English c. 1300. Spelling did not become standardised until the eighteenth century, and spellings such as "pirrot", "pyrate" and "pyrat" occurred until this period.

== History ==
=== Europe ===
==== Antiquity ====
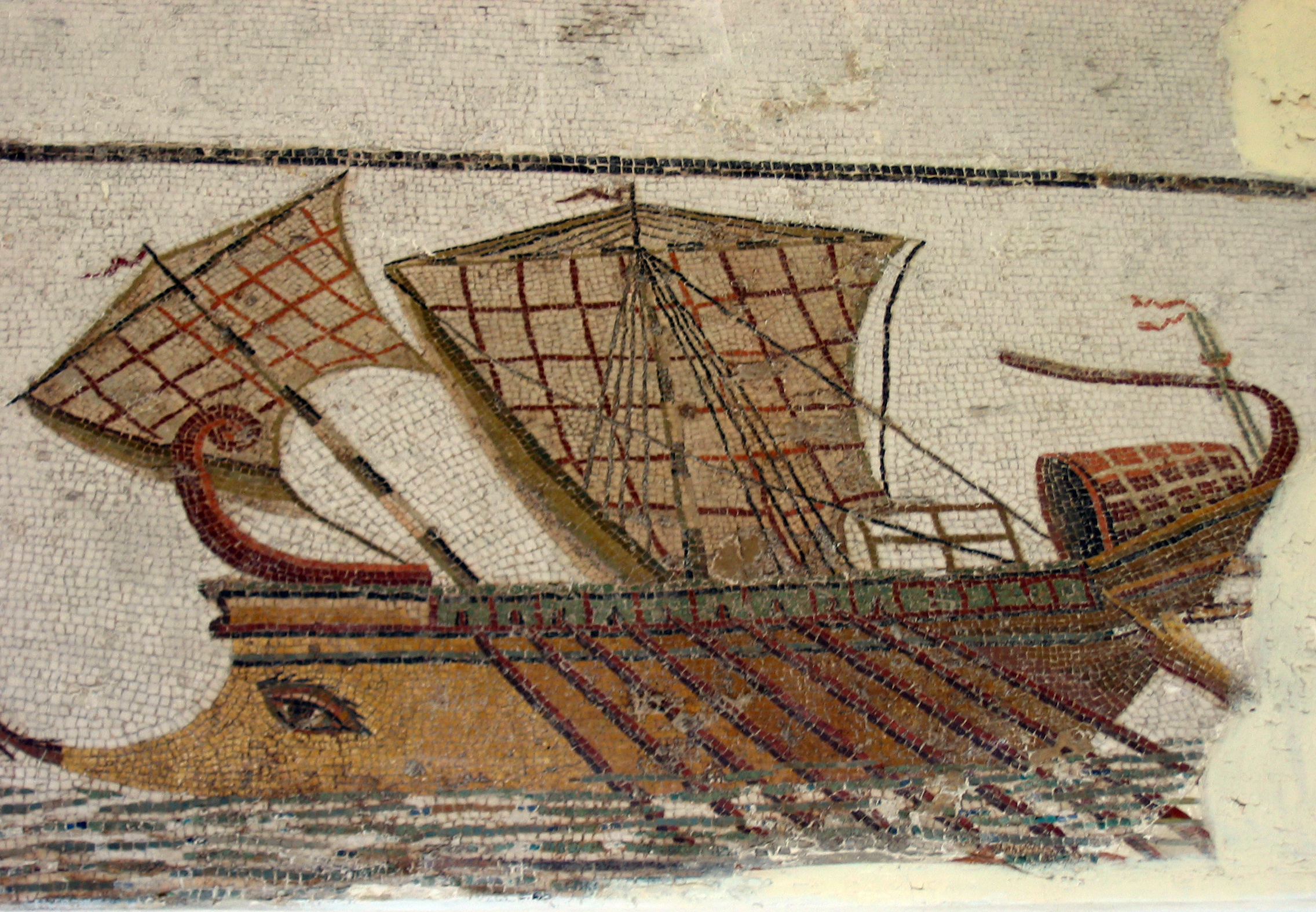
A mosaic of a Roman trireme in Tunisia

The earliest documented instances of piracy are the exploits of the Sea People who threatened ships sailing in the Aegean and Mediterranean in the 14th century BC. In classical antiquity, the Phoenicians, Illyrians and Tyrrhenians were known as pirates. In the pre-classical era, the ancient Greeks condoned piracy as a viable profession; it apparently was widespread and "regarded as an entirely honourable way of making a living". References are made to its perfectly normal occurrence in many texts, including Homer's Iliad and Odyssey, and abduction of women and children to be sold into slavery was common. By the era of Classical Greece, piracy was looked upon as a "disgrace" to have as a profession.

In the 3rd century BC, pirate attacks on Olympus in Lycia brought impoverishment. Among the most famous ancient pirating peoples were the Illyrians, who inhabited the western Balkan Peninsula. Constantly raiding the Adriatic Sea, the Illyrians caused many conflicts with the Roman Republic. It was not until 229 BC when the Romans decisively beat the Illyrian fleets that their threat was ended. During the 1st century BC, there were pirate states along the Anatolian coast, threatening the commerce of the Roman Empire in the eastern Mediterranean. On one voyage across the Aegean Sea in 75 BC, Julius Caesar was kidnapped and briefly held by Cilician pirates and held prisoner in the Dodecanese islet of Pharmacusa. The Senate invested the general Gnaeus Pompeius Magnus with powers to deal with piracy in 67 BC (the Lex Gabinia), and Pompey, after three months of naval warfare, managed to suppress the threat.

As early as 258 AD, the Gothic-Herulic fleet ravaged towns on the coasts of the Black Sea and Sea of Marmara. The Aegean coast suffered similar attacks a few years later. In 264, the Goths reached Galatia and Cappadocia, and Gothic pirates landed on Cyprus and Crete. In the process, the Goths seized enormous booty and took thousands into captivity. In 286 AD, Carausius, a Roman military commander of Gaulish origins, was appointed to command the Classis Britannica, and given the responsibility of eliminating Frankish and Saxon pirates who had been raiding the coasts of Armorica and Belgic Gaul. In the Roman province of Britannia, Saint Patrick was captured and enslaved by Irish pirates.

==== Middle Ages ====
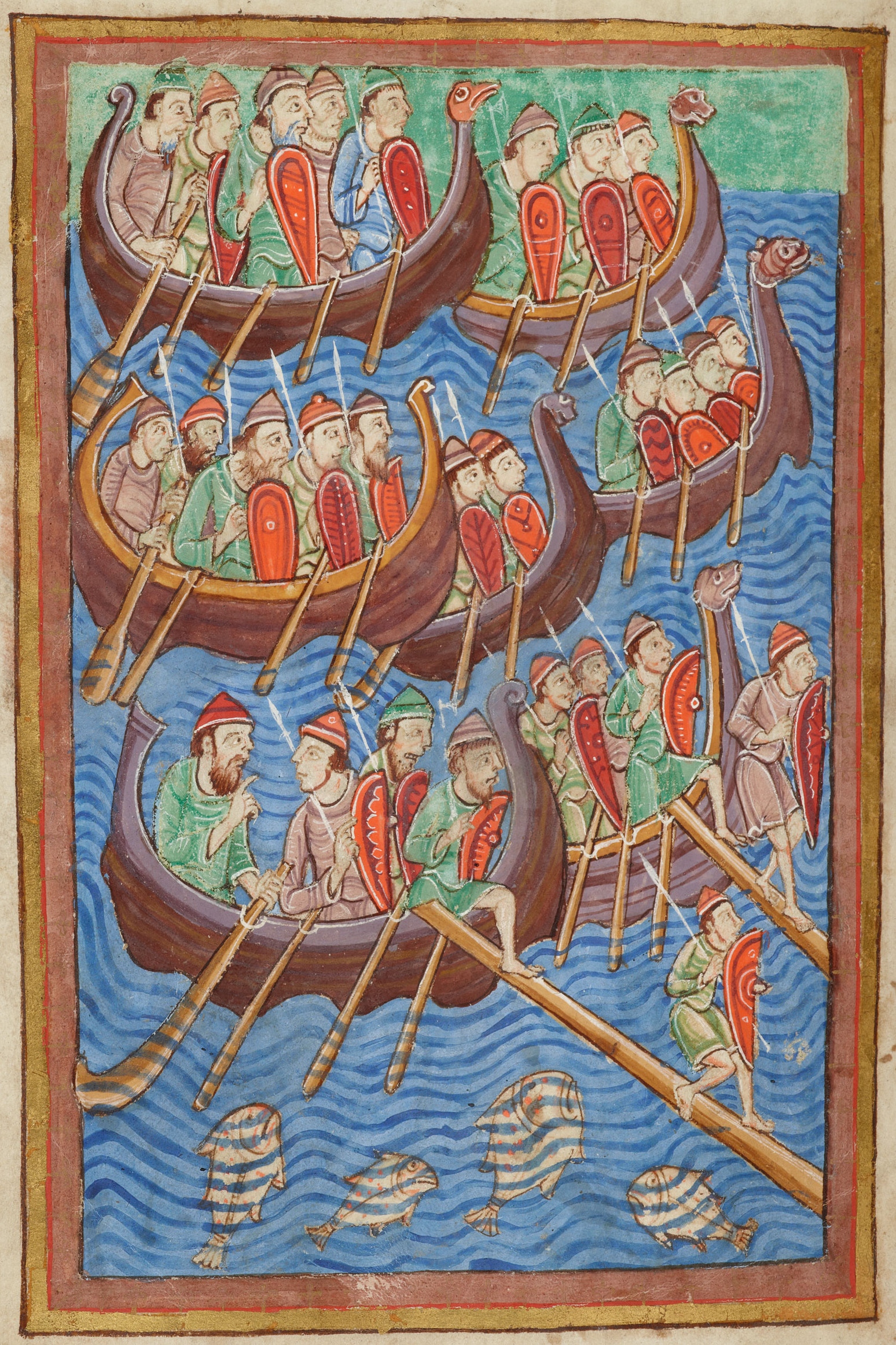
A fleet of Vikings, painted mid-12th century

The most widely recognized and far-reaching pirates in medieval Europe were the Vikings, seaborne warriors from Scandinavia who raided and looted mainly between the 8th and 12th centuries, during the Viking Age in the Early Middle Ages. They raided the coasts, rivers, and inland cities of all Western Europe as far as Seville, which was attacked by the Norse in 844. Vikings also attacked the coasts of North Africa and Italy and plundered all the coasts of the Baltic Sea. Some Vikings ascended the rivers of Eastern Europe as far as the Black Sea and Persia.

In the Late Middle Ages, the Frisian pirates known as Arumer Zwarte Hoop led by Pier Gerlofs Donia and Wijerd Jelckama, fought against the troops of the Holy Roman Emperor Charles V with some success.

Toward the end of the 9th century, Moorish pirate havens were established along the coast of southern France and northern Italy. In 846 Moor raiders sacked the extra muros Basilicas of Saint Peter and Saint Paul in Rome. In 911, the bishop of Narbonne was unable to return to France from Rome because the Moors from Fraxinet controlled all the passes in the Alps. Moor pirates operated out of the Balearic Islands in the 10th century. From 824 to 961, Arab pirates in the Emirate of Crete raided the entire Mediterranean. In the 14th century, raids by Moorish pirates forced the Venetian Duke of Crete to ask the Republic of Venice to keep its fleet on constant guard.

After the Slavic invasions of the former Roman province of Dalmatia in the 5th and 6th centuries, a tribe called the Narentines revived the old Illyrian piratical practices and often raided the Adriatic Sea from the 7th century onward. Their raids in the Adriatic increased rapidly, until the whole Sea was no longer safe for travel.

The Narentines took more liberties in their raiding quests while the Venetian Navy was abroad, as when it was campaigning in Sicilian waters in 827–882. As soon as the Venetian fleet returned to the Adriatic, the Narentines reverted to their habits, even signing a Treaty in Venice and baptising their Slavic pagan leader into Christianity. In 834 or 835, they broke the treaty, and again they raided Venetian traders returning from Benevento. All of Venice's military attempts to punish them in 839 and 840 utterly failed.

Later, they raided the Venetians more often, together with the Arabs. In 846, the Narentines broke through to Venice itself and raided its lagoon city of Caorle. This led to a Byzantine military campaign against them, which brought Christianity to them. After the Arab raids on the Adriatic coast circa 872 and the Imperial Navy's retreat, the Narentines continued their raids on Venetian waters, leading to new conflicts with the Italians in 887–888. The Venetians futilely continued to fight them throughout the 10th and 11th centuries.

Domagoj, Duke of Croatia was accused of attacking a ship which was bringing home the papal legates who had participated in the Eighth Catholic Ecumenical Council, after which Pope John VIII addressed Domagoj with a request that his pirates stop attacking Christians at sea.

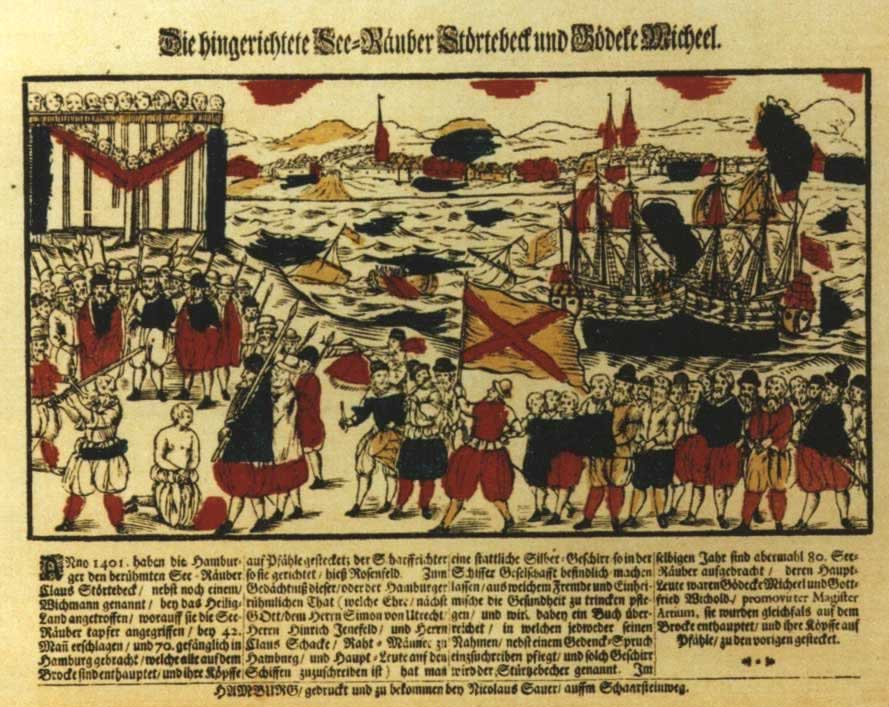
The Vitalienbrüder. Piracy became endemic in the Baltic Sea in the Middle Ages because of the Victual Brothers.

In 937, Irish pirates sided with the Scots, Vikings, Picts, and Welsh in their invasion of England. Athelstan drove them back.

The Slavic piracy in the Baltic Sea ended with the Danish conquest of the Rani stronghold of Arkona in 1168. In the 12th century, the coasts of western Scandinavia were plundered by Curonians and Oeselians from the eastern coast of the Baltic Sea. In the 13th and 14th centuries, pirates threatened the Hanseatic routes and nearly brought sea trade to the brink of extinction. The Victual Brothers of Gotland were a companionship of privateers who later turned to piracy as the Likedeelers. They were especially noted for their leaders Klaus Störtebeker and Gödeke Michels. Until about 1440, maritime trade in both the North Sea, the Baltic Sea, and the Gulf of Bothnia was seriously in danger of attack by pirates.

H. Thomas Milhorn mentions a certain Englishman named William Maurice, convicted of piracy in 1241, as the first person known to have been hanged, drawn and quartered, which would indicate that the then-ruling King Henry III took an especially severe view of this crime.

The ushkuiniks were Novgorodian pirates who looted the cities on the Volga and Kama Rivers in the 14th century.

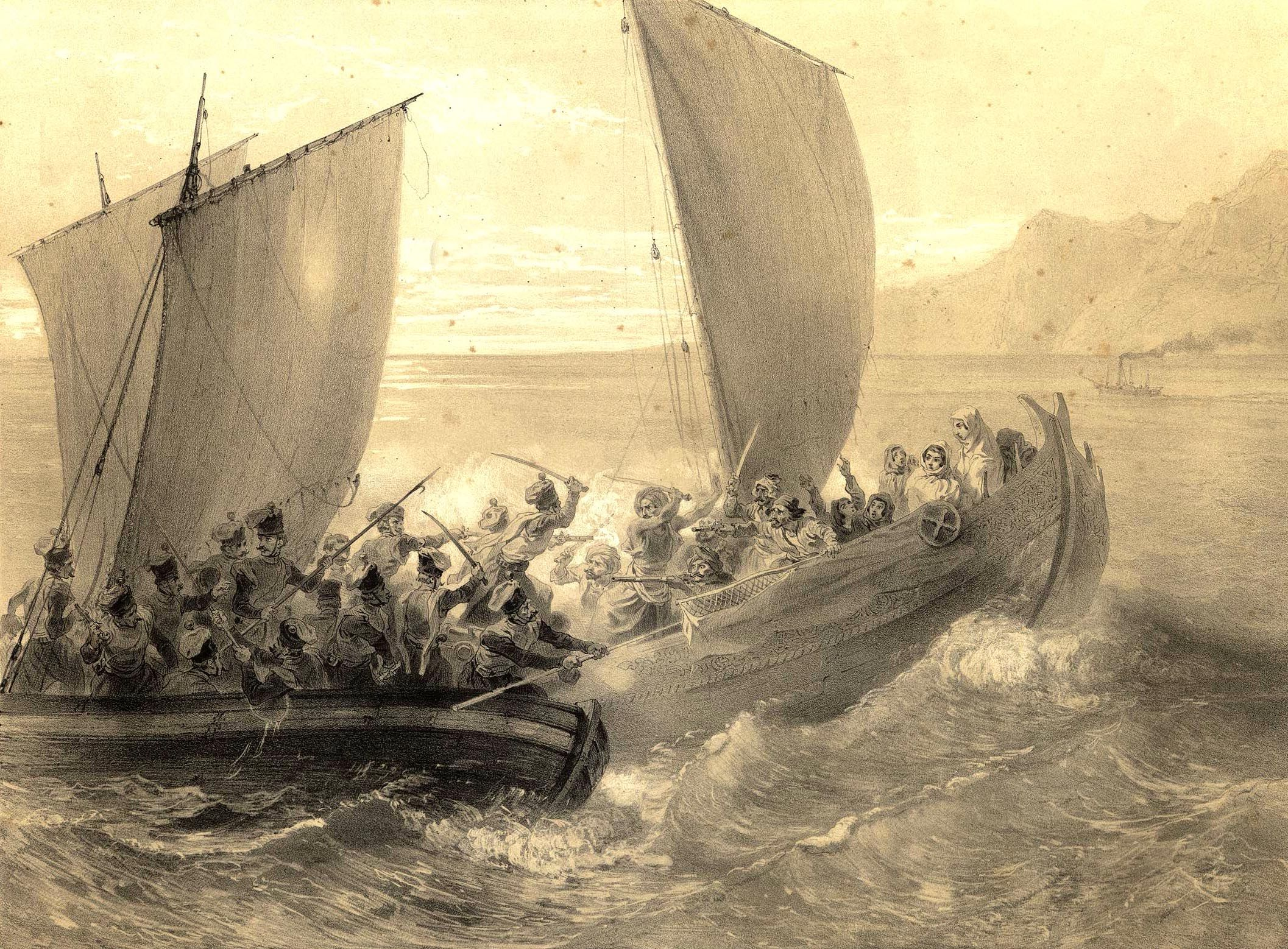
Cossacks of Azov fighting a Turk ship by Grigory Gagarin

As early as Byzantine times, the Maniots (one of Greece's toughest populations) were known as pirates. The Maniots considered piracy a legitimate response to their land's poverty, and it became their main source of income. The main victims of Maniot pirates were the Ottomans, but the Maniots also targeted ships of European countries.

Zaporizhian Sich was a pirate republic in Europe from the 16th through to the 18th century. Situated in Cossack territory in the remote steppe of Eastern Europe, it was populated with Ukrainian peasants who had run away from their feudal masters, outlaws, destitute gentry, run-away slaves from Turkish galleys, etc. The remoteness of the place and the rapids of the Dnieper river effectively guarded it against invasions by vengeful powers.

The main target of the inhabitants of the Zaporizhian Sich who called themselves "Cossacks", were rich settlements at the Black Sea shores of Ottoman Empire and Crimean Khanate. By 1615 and 1625, Zaporozhian Cossacks had even managed to raze townships on the outskirts of Istanbul, forcing the Ottoman Sultan to flee his palace. Don Cossacks under Stenka Razin even ravaged the Persian coasts.

==== Mediterranean corsairs ====
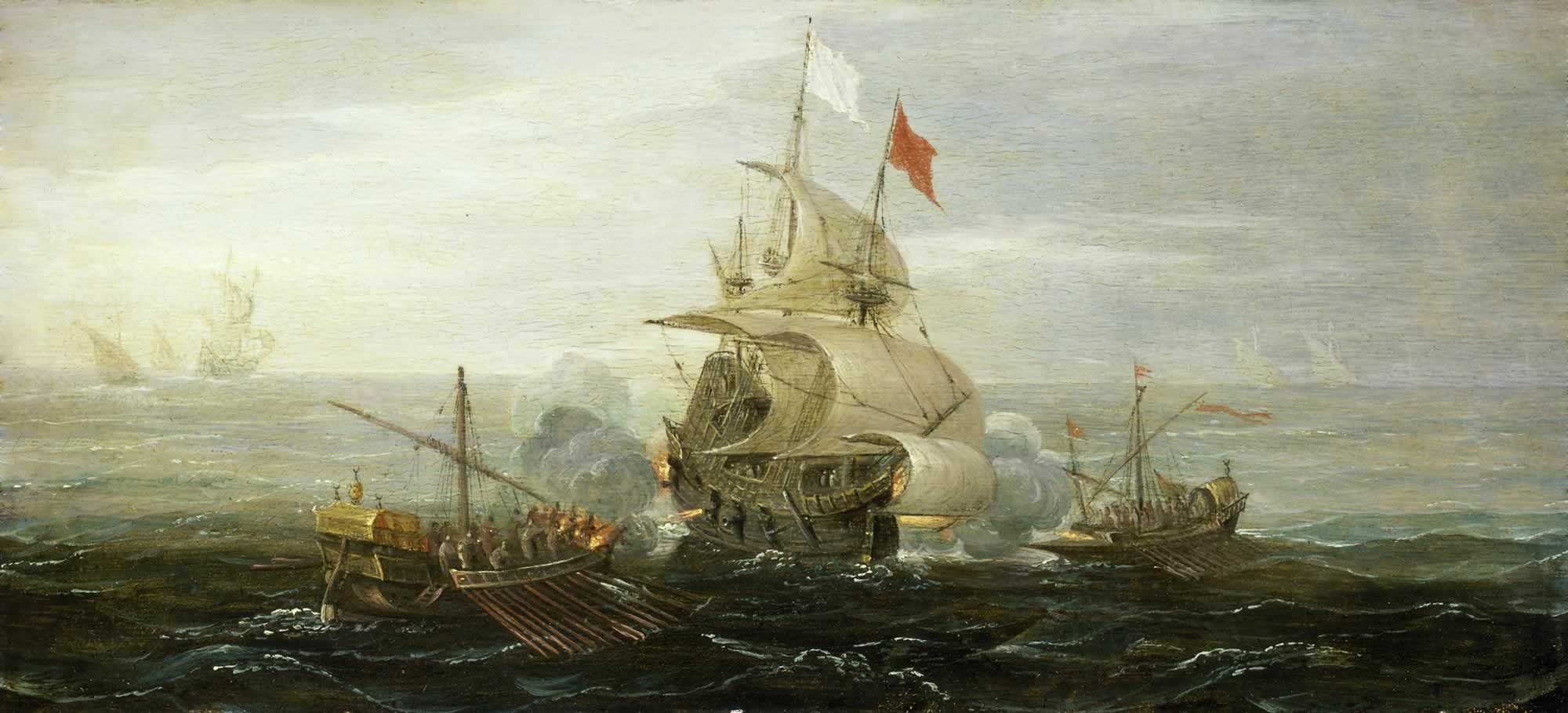
A French ship under attack by Barbary pirates, ca. 1615

Though less famous and romanticized than Atlantic or Caribbean pirates, corsairs in the Mediterranean were equal to or outnumbered the former at any given point in history. Mediterranean piracy was conducted almost entirely with galleys until the mid-17th century, when they were gradually replaced with highly maneuverable sailing vessels such as xebecs and brigantines. They were of a smaller type than battle galleys, often referred to as galiots or fustas.

Pirate galleys were small, nimble, lightly armed, but often crewed in large numbers to overwhelm the often minimal crews of merchant ships. In general, pirate craft were extremely difficult for patrolling craft actually to hunt down and capture. Anne Hilarion de Tourville, a French admiral of the 17th century, believed that the only way to run down raiders from the infamous corsair Moroccan port of Salé was by using a captured pirate vessel of the same type.

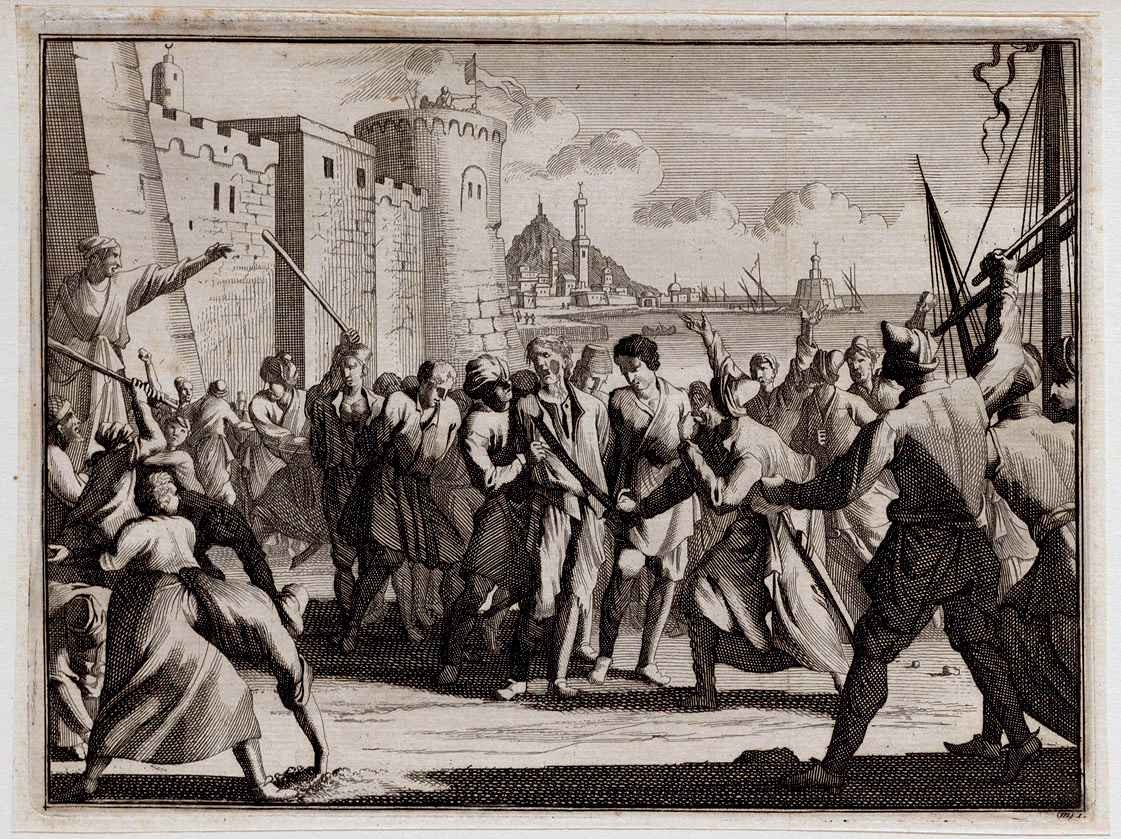
Barbary pirates were involved in the Barbary slave trade in North Africa

Using oared vessels to combat pirates was common, even among the major powers in the Caribbean. Purpose-built galleys, or hybrid sailing vessels, were built by the English in Jamaica in 1683 and by the Spanish in the late 16th century. Specially-built sailing frigates with oar-ports on the lower decks, like the James Galley and Charles Galley, and oar-equipped sloops proved highly useful for pirate hunting, though they were not built in sufficient numbers to check piracy until the 1720s.

The expansion of Muslim power through the Ottoman conquest of large parts of the eastern Mediterranean in the 15th and 16th centuries resulted in extensive piracy on sea trade. The so-called Barbary pirates began to operate out of North African ports in Algiers, Tunis, Tripoli, Morocco, around 1500, preying primarily on the shipping of Christian powers, including massive slave raids at sea as well as on land. The Barbary pirates were nominally under Ottoman suzerainty, but had considerable independence to prey on the enemies of Islam. The Muslim corsairs were technically often privateers with support from legitimate, though highly belligerent, states. They considered themselves holy Muslim warriors, or ghazis, carrying on the tradition of resisting the incursions by Western Christians that had begun with the First Crusade in the late 11th century.

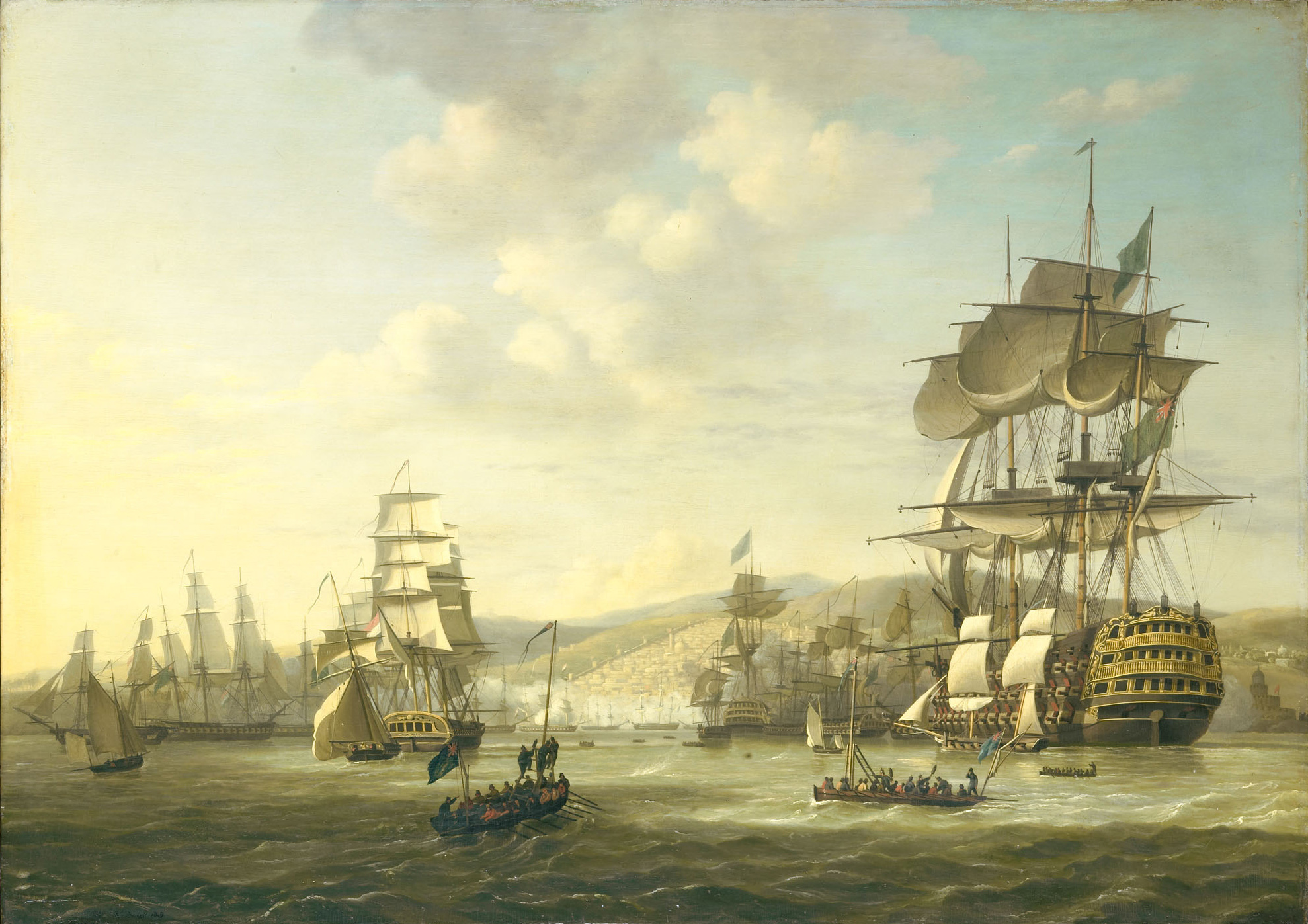
The Bombardment of Algiers by the Anglo-Dutch fleet in 1816 to support the ultimatum to release enslaved Europeans

Coastal villages and towns of Italy, Spain, and islands in the Mediterranean were frequently attacked by Muslim corsairs, and their inhabitants almost completely abandoned long stretches of the Italian and Spanish coasts. After 1600, the Barbary corsairs occasionally entered the Atlantic and struck as far north as Iceland. According to Robert Davis between 1 million and 1.25 million Europeans were abducted by Barbary corsairs and sold into slavery in North Africa and the Ottoman Empire between the 16th and 19th centuries. The most famous corsairs were the Ottoman Albanian Hayreddin and his older brother Oruç Reis (Redbeard), Turgut Reis (known as Dragut in the West), Kurtoglu (known as Curtogoli in the West), Kemal Reis, Salih Reis, and Koca Murat Reis. A few Barbary corsairs, such as the Dutch Jan Janszoon and the English John Ward (Muslim name Yusuf Reis), were renegade European privateers who had converted to Islam.

The Barbary pirates had a direct Christian counterpart in the military order of the Knights of Saint John, which operated first out of Rhodes and, after 1530, Malta. However, they were fewer in number and enslaved fewer people. Both sides waged war against the respective enemies of their faith, and both used galleys as their primary weapons. Both sides also used captured or bought galley slaves to man the oars of their ships. The Muslims relied mostly on captured Christians, the Christians used a mix of enslaved Muslims, Christian convicts, and a small contingency of buonavoglie, free men who, out of desperation or poverty, had taken to rowing.

Historian Peter Earle has described the two sides of the Christian-Muslim Mediterranean conflict as "mirror image[s] of maritime predation, two businesslike fleets of plunderers set against each other". This conflict of faith in the form of privateering, piracy and slave raiding generated a complex system that was upheld/financed/operated on the trade in plunder and enslaved people that was generated from a low-intensive conflict, as well as the need for protection from violence. The system has been described as a "massive, multinational protection racket", the Christian side of which did not end until 1798, during the Napoleonic Wars. The Barbary corsairs were quelled as late as the 1830s, effectively ending the last vestiges of counter-crusading jihad.

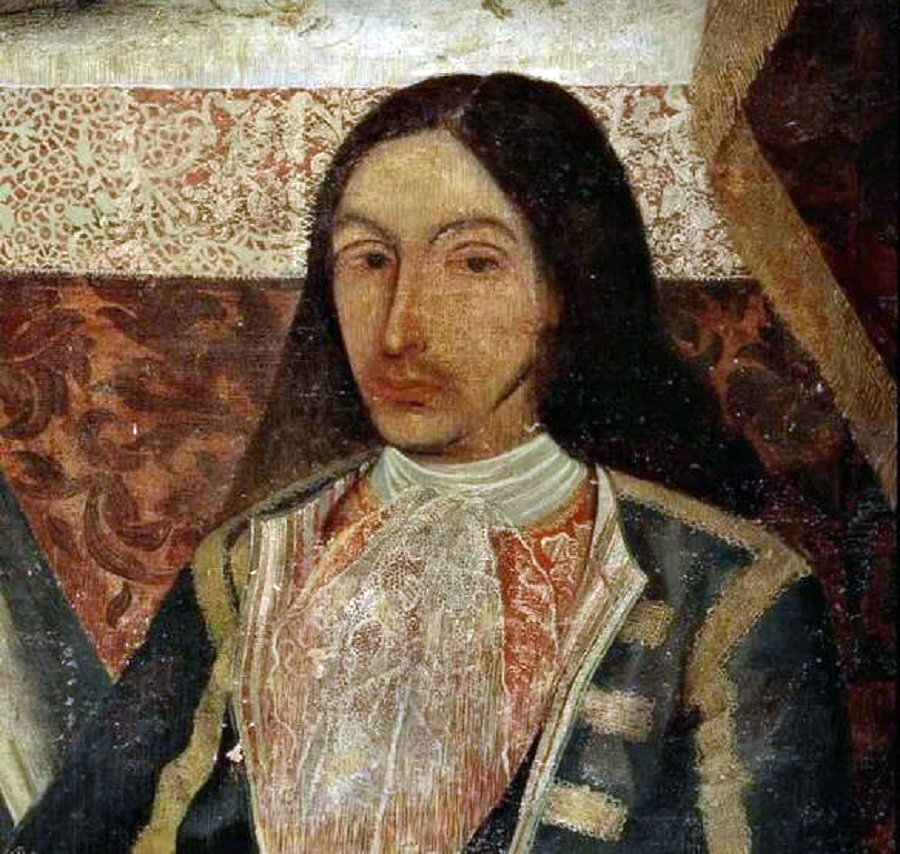
Amaro Pargo was one of the most famous corsairs of the Golden Age of Piracy

Piracy off the Barbary coast was often assisted by competition among European powers in the 17th century. France encouraged the corsairs against Spain, and later Britain and Holland supported them against France. By the second half of the 17th century, the greater European naval powers began to initiate reprisals to intimidate the Barbary States into making peace with them. The most successful of the Christian states in dealing with the corsair threat was England. From the 1630s onwards, England had signed peace treaties with the Barbary States on various occasions, but invariably breaches of these agreements led to renewed wars.

Albanian piracy, mainly centered in the town of Ulcinj (thus came to be known as Dulcignotti), flourished during the 15th to the 19th century.

France, which had recently emerged as a leading naval power, achieved comparable success soon afterwards, with bombardments of Algiers in 1682, 1683, and 1688 securing a lasting peace, while Tripoli was similarly coerced in 1686. In 1783 and 1784, the Spaniards bombarded Algiers in an effort to stem the piracy. The second time, Admiral Barceló damaged the city so severely that the Algerian Dey asked Spain to negotiate a peace treaty. From then on, Spanish vessels and coasts were safe for several years.

Until the American Declaration of Independence in 1776, British treaties with the North African states protected American ships from the Barbary corsairs. Morocco, which in 1777 was the first independent nation to recognize the United States publicly, became, in 1784, the first Barbary power to seize an American vessel after independence. While the United States managed to secure peace treaties, these obliged it to pay tribute for protection from attack. Payments in ransom and tribute to the Barbary states amounted to 20% of United States government annual expenditures in 1800, leading to the Barbary Wars that ended the payment of tribute. Algiers broke the 1805 peace treaty after only two years and refused to implement the 1815 treaty until Britain compelled it to do so in 1816.

In 1815, the sacking of Palma on the island of Sardinia by a Tunisian squadron, which carried off 158 inhabitants, roused widespread indignation. Britain had, by this time, banned the slave trade and was seeking to induce other countries to do likewise. This led to complaints from states that were still vulnerable to the corsairs that Britain's enthusiasm for ending the trade in enslaved Africans did not extend to stopping the enslavement of Europeans and Americans by the Barbary States.

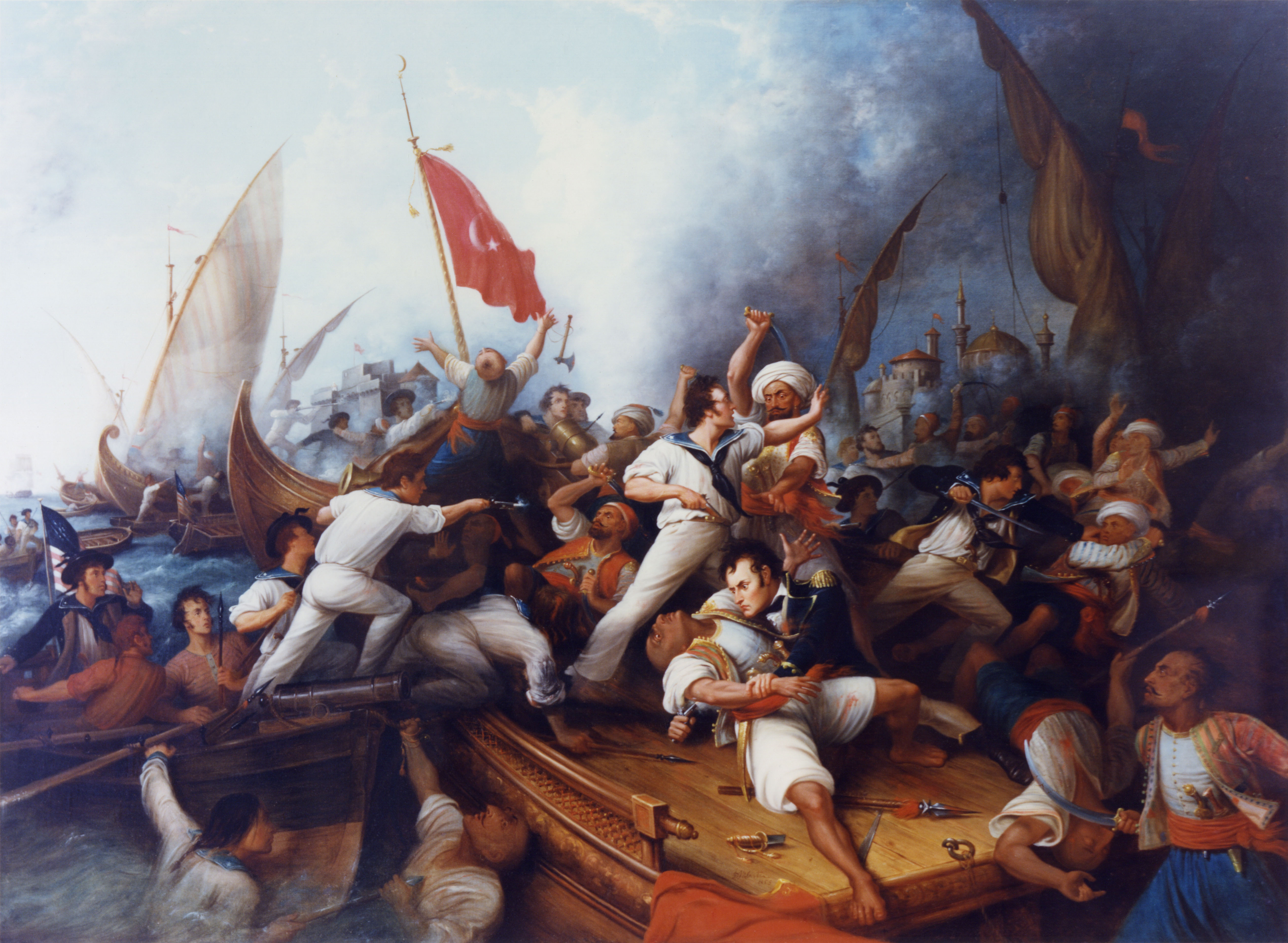
U.S. naval officer Stephen Decatur boarding a Tripolitan gunboat during the First Barbary War, 1804

To neutralise this objection and further the anti-slavery campaign, in 1816 Lord Exmouth was sent to secure new concessions from Tripoli, Tunis, and Algiers, including a pledge to treat Christian captives in any future conflict as prisoners of war rather than enslaved people and the imposition of peace between Algiers and the kingdoms of Sardinia and Sicily. On his first visit, he negotiated satisfactory treaties and sailed for home. While he was negotiating, some Sardinian fishermen who had settled at Bona on the Tunisian coast were brutally treated without his knowledge. As Sardinians, they were technically under British protection, and the government sent Exmouth back to secure reparation. On August 17, in combination with a Dutch squadron under Admiral Van de Capellen, he bombarded Algiers. Both Algiers and Tunis made fresh concessions as a result.

Securing uniform compliance with a total prohibition of slave-raiding, which was traditionally of central importance to the North African economy, presented difficulties beyond those faced in ending attacks on ships of individual nations, which had left slavers able to continue their accustomed way of life by preying on less well-protected peoples. Algiers renewed its slave-raiding, though on a smaller scale. Measures to be taken against the city's government were discussed at the Congress of Aix-la-Chapelle in 1818. In 1820, another British fleet under Admiral Sir Harry Neal again bombarded Algiers. Corsair activity based in Algiers did not entirely cease until its conquest by France in 1830.

=== Southeast Asia ===
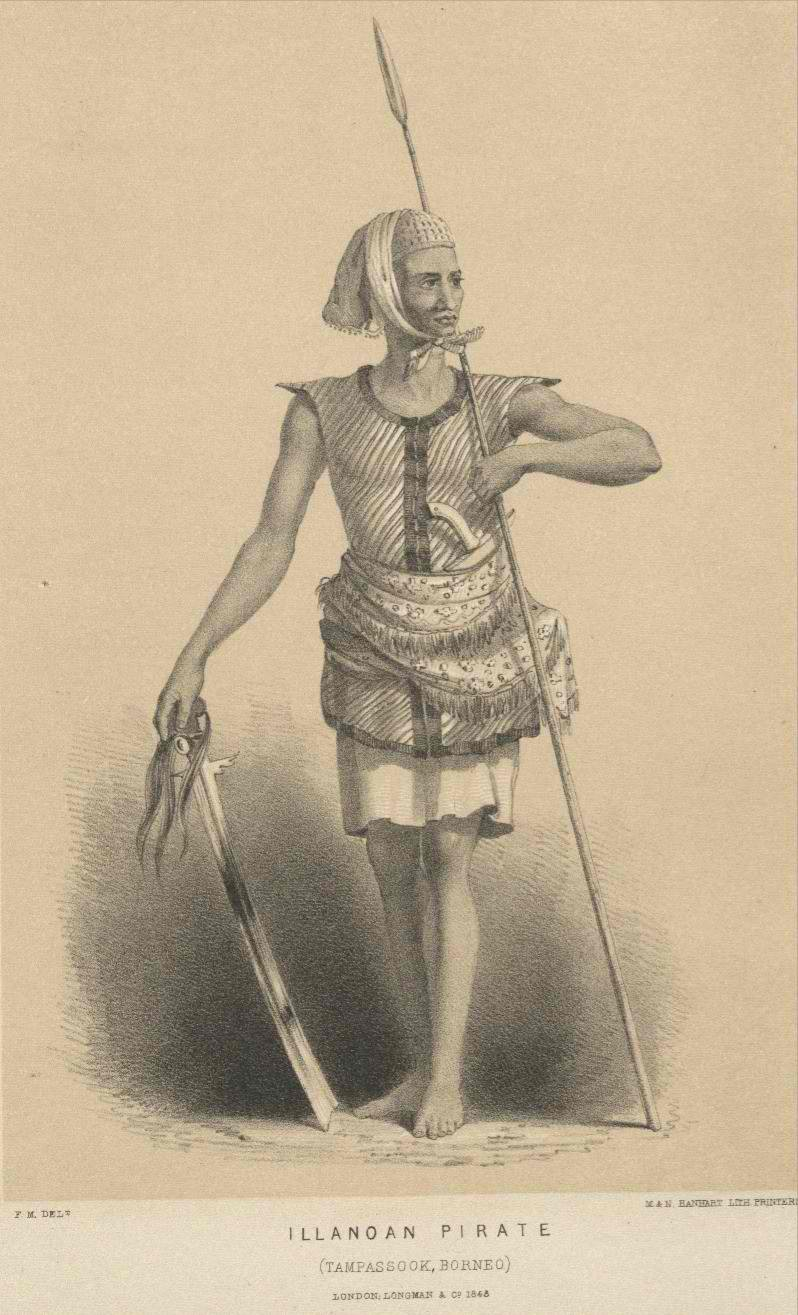
A 19th-century illustration of an Iranun pirate

In thalassocratic Austronesian cultures in Island Southeast Asia, maritime raids for enslaved people and resources against rival polities have ancient origins. It was associated with prestige and prowess and often recorded in tattoos. Early European cultures recorded reciprocal raiding traditions as being prevalent throughout Island Southeast Asia.

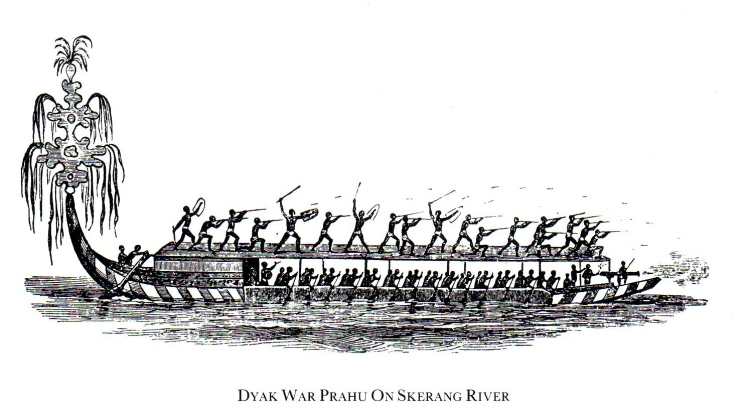
Iban war prahu in Skerang river

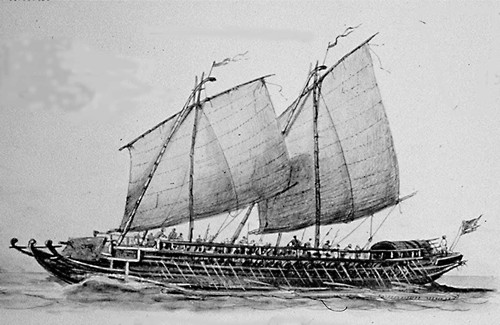
1890 illustration by Rafael Monleón of a late 18th-century Iranun lanong warship. The Malay word for "pirate", lanun, originates from an exonym of the Iranun people

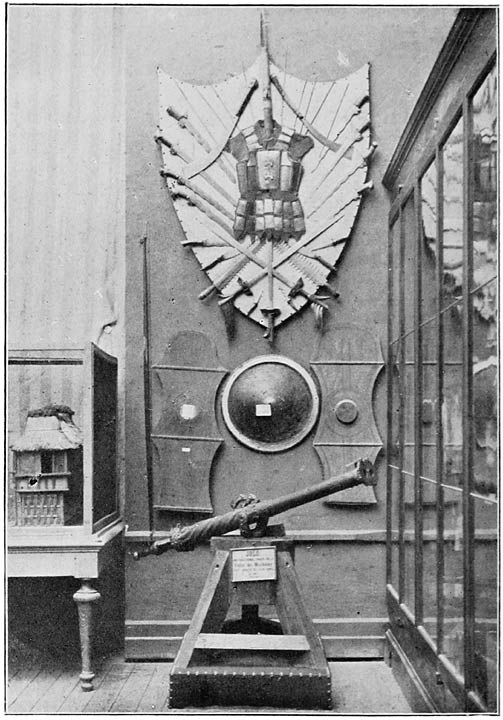
Double-barrelled lantaka cannons, kalasag shields, armor, and various swords (including kalis, panabas, and kampilan) used by Moro pirates in the Philippines (c. 1900)

With the advent of Islam and the colonial era, enslaved people became a valuable resource for trading with European, Arab, and Chinese slavers, and the volume of piracy and slave raids increased significantly. Numerous native peoples engaged in sea raiding; they include the Iranun and Balanguingui slavers of Sulu, the Iban headhunters of Borneo, the Bugis sailors of South Sulawesi, and the Malays of western Southeast Asia. Piracy was also practiced on a smaller scale by foreign seafarers, including Chinese, Japanese, and European traders, as well as renegades and outlaws. The volume of piracy and raids was often dependent on the ebb and flow of trade and monsoons, with pirate season (known colloquially as the "Pirate Wind") starting from August to September.

Slave raids were of high economic importance to the Muslim Sultanates in the Sulu Sea: the Sultanate of Sulu, the Sultanate of Maguindanao, and the Confederation of Sultanates in Lanao (the modern Moro people). It is estimated that from 1770 to 1870, around 200,000 to 300,000 people were enslaved by Iranun and Banguingui slavers. David P. Forsythe put the estimate much higher, at around 2 million people abducted and enslaved within the first two centuries of Spanish rule of the Philippines after 1565.

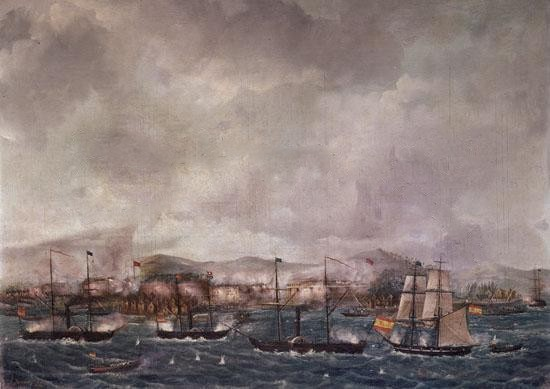
Spanish warships bombarding the Moro Pirates of the southern Philippines in 1848

These enslaved people were taken from piracy on passing ships as well as coastal raids on settlements as far as the Malacca Strait, Java, the southern coast of China, and the islands beyond the Makassar Strait. Most of the slaves were Tagalogs, Visayans, and "Malays" (including Bugis, Mandarese, Iban, and Makassar). There were also occasional European and Chinese captives, usually ransomed through Tausug intermediaries of the Sulu Sultanate. Enslaved people were the primary indicators of wealth and status, and they were the source of labor for the farms, fisheries, and workshops of the sultanates. While enslaved people were rarely sold, they were trafficked extensively in enslaved people purchased from the Iranun and Banguingui slave markets. By the 1850s, enslaved people constituted 50% or more of the population of the Sulu archipelago.

The scale was so massive that the word for "pirate" in Malay became lanun, an exonym of the Iranun people. Slaves and the slave trade largely ran the economy of the Sulu sultanates. Male captives of the Iranun and the Banguingui were treated brutally; even fellow Muslim captives were not spared. They were usually forced to serve as galley slaves on the lanong and garay warships of their captors. Female captives, however, were usually treated better. There were no recorded accounts of rapes, though some were starved for discipline. Within a year of capture, most of the captives of the Iranun and Banguingui would be bartered off in Jolo usually for rice, opium, bolts of cloth, iron bars, brassware, and weapons. The buyers were usually Tausug datu from the Sultanate of Sulu who had preferential treatment, but buyers also included European (Dutch and Portuguese) and Chinese traders as well as Visayan pirates (renegados).

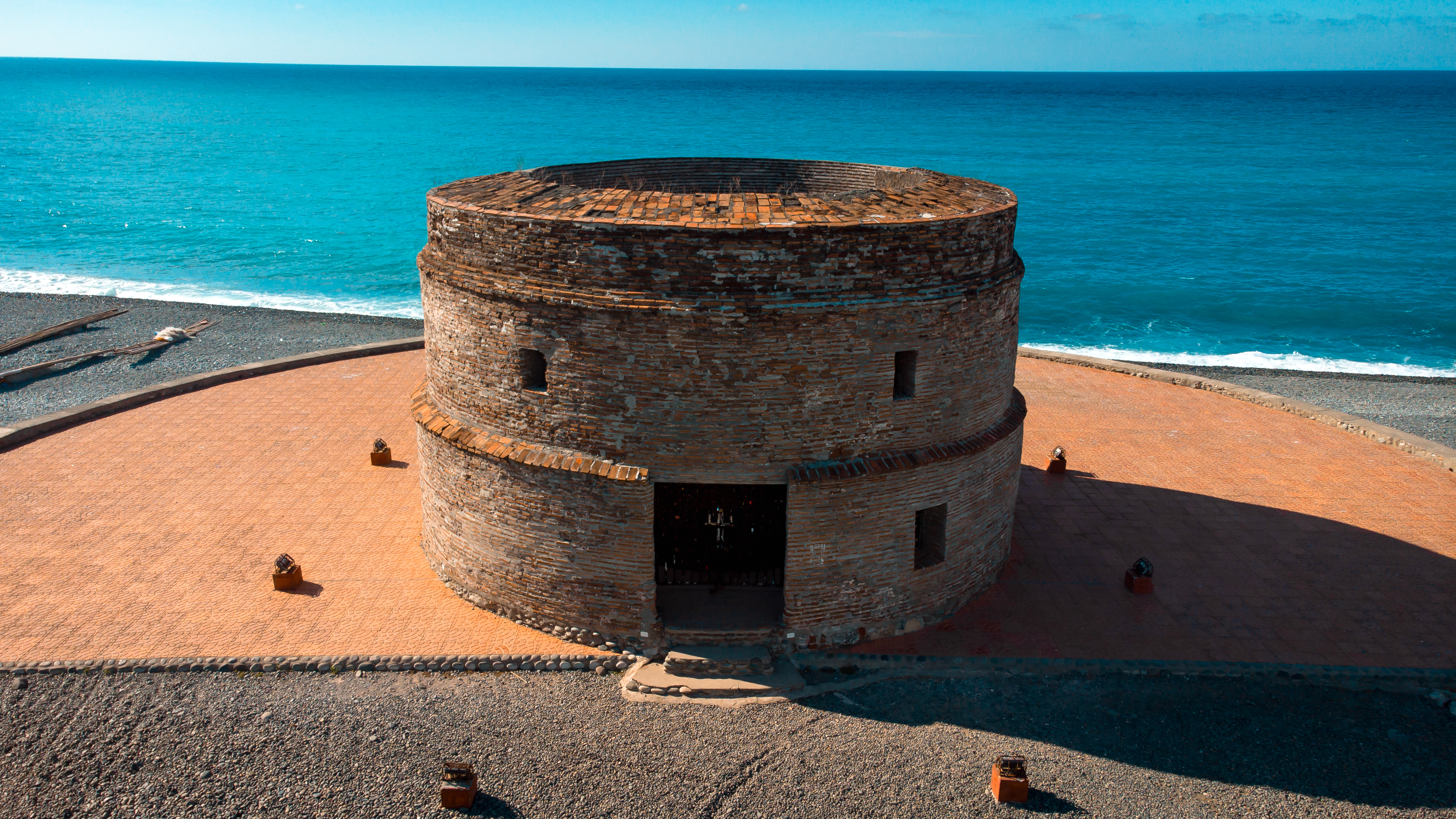
Baluarte Watchtower, La Union. A 400-year-old Spanish-era structure built to guard against pirates, later used in World War II as a communication tower for the USAFIP-NL airfield.

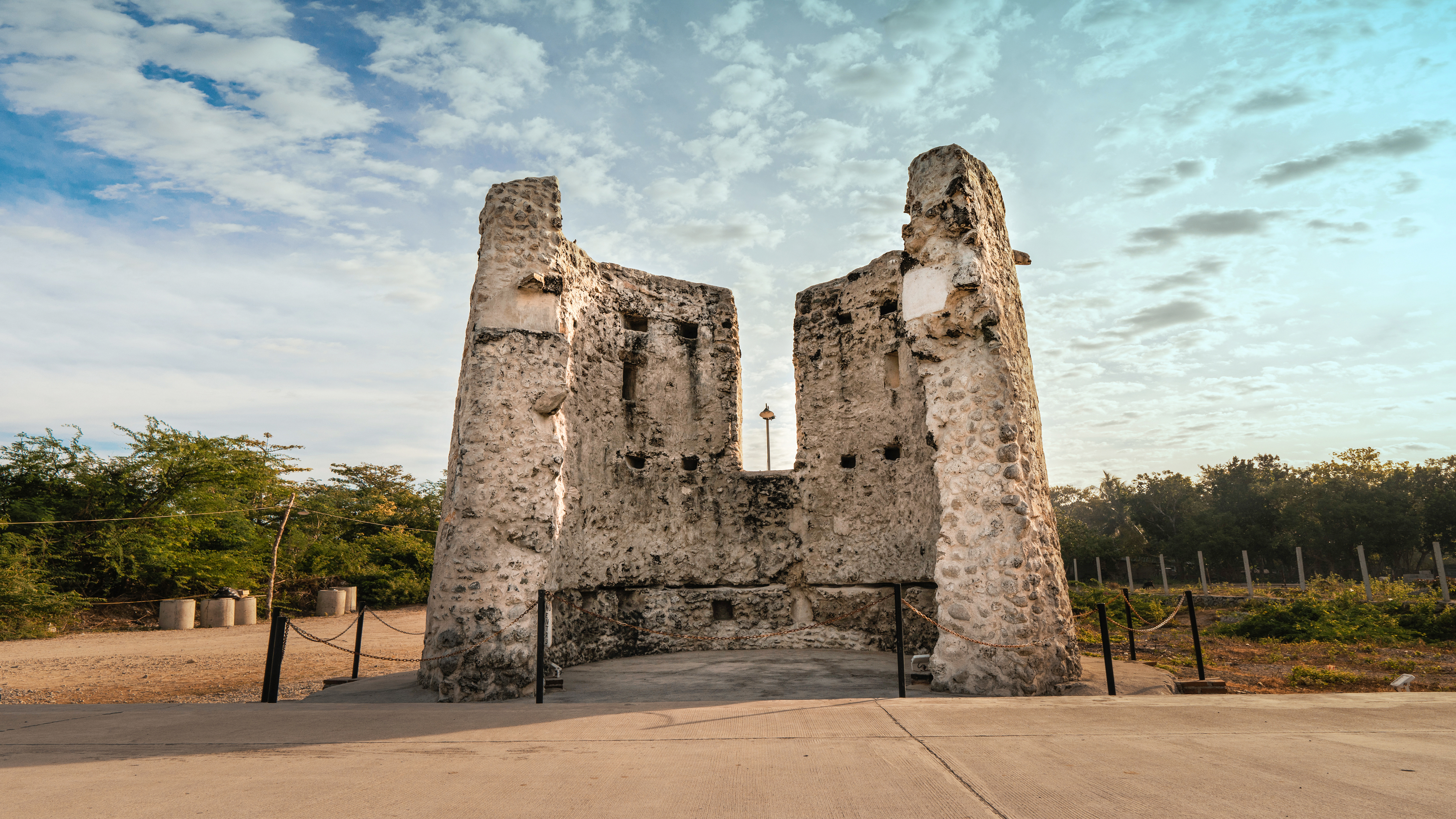
Currimao Watchtower, Ilocos Norte. 'Currimao' comes from the Iloco term cumaws (pirates) and the Spanish word correr (to run), reflecting the warnings given by watchmen during pirate attacks.

Spanish authorities and native Christian Filipinos responded to the Moro slave raids by building watchtowers and forts across the Philippine archipelago, many of which are still standing today. In Northern Luzon, particularly in the Pangasinan, Ilocos and Cagayan, the coastal villages and towns were frequently raided by Moro and Chinese pirates, locally known as tírong or cumaw (raiders, attackers or pirates). These pirates looted and burned villages (barrios) and captured women and children for enslavement. To counter these threats, Spanish authorities constructed circular adobe watchtowers, or baluartes, measuring 6 to 7 meters high. These structures, built strategically along the coastline using coral blocks bonded with a mixture of lime and egg whites, served as both lookout points and defensive fortifications, protecting villages from pirate attacks.

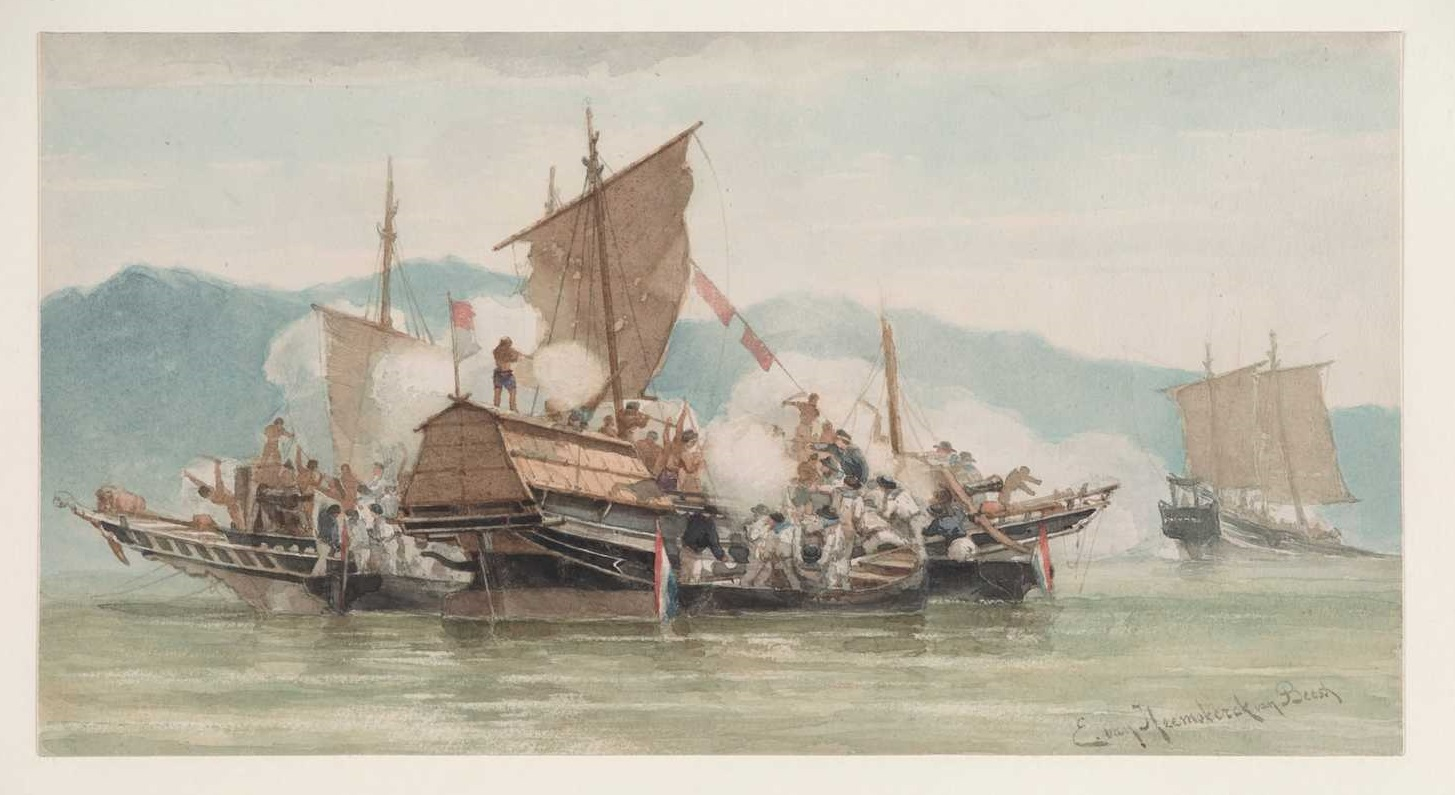
A fight between Filipino pirates, Bugis trading ship, and Dutch mariners.

Some provincial capitals were also moved further inland. Major command posts were built in Manila, Cavite, Cebu, Iloilo, Zamboanga, and Iligan. Defending ships were also built by local communities, especially in the Visayas Islands, including the construction of war "barangayanes" (balangay) that were faster than the Moro raiders and could give chase. As resistance against raiders increased, Lanong warships of the Iranun were eventually replaced by the smaller and faster garay warships of the Banguingui in the early 19th century. The Moro raids were eventually subdued by several major naval expeditions by the Spanish and local forces from 1848 to 1891, including retaliatory bombardment and capture of Moro settlements. By this time, the Spanish had also acquired steam gunboats (vapor), which could easily overtake and destroy the native Moro warships.

Several famous pirates, such as Intjeh Cohdja and Wassingrana, were hunted by the VOC for hijacking their merchant ships in the Eastern salient of Java.

Aside from the Iranun and Banguingui pirates, other polities were also associated with maritime raiding. The Bugis sailors of South Sulawesi were infamous as pirates who used to range as far west as Singapore and as far north as the Philippines in search of targets. The Orang laut pirates controlled shipping in the Straits of Malacca and the waters around Singapore, and the Malay and Sea Dayak pirates preyed on maritime shipping in the waters between Singapore and Hong Kong from their haven in Borneo.

=== East Asia ===
In East Asia, by the ninth century, populations centered mostly around merchant activities in coastal Shandong and Jiangsu. Wealthy benefactors including Chang Pogo established Silla Buddhist temples in the region. Chang Pogo had become incensed at the treatment of his fellow citizens, who in the unstable milieu of late Tang often fell victim to coastal pirates or inland bandits. After returning to Silla around 825, and in possession of a formidable private fleet headquartered at Cheonghae (Wando), Chang Pogo petitioned the Silla king Heungdeok (r. 826–836) to establish a permanent maritime garrison to protect Silla merchant activities in the Yellow Sea. Heungdeok agreed and, in 828, formally established the Cheonghae (淸海, "clear sea") Garrison (청해진) at what is today Wando island off Korea's South Jeolla province. Heungdeok gave Chang an army of 10,000 men to establish and man the defensive works. The remnants of Cheonghae Garrison can still be seen on Jang islet just off Wando's southern coast. Chang's force, though nominally bequeathed by the Silla king, was effectively under his own control. Chang became the arbiter of Yellow Sea commerce and navigation.

From the 13th century, the Wokou, based in Japan, made their debut in East Asia, initiating invasions that would persist for 300 years. The wokou raids peaked in the 1550s, but by then the wokou were mostly Chinese smugglers who reacted strongly against the Ming dynasty's strict prohibition on private sea trade.

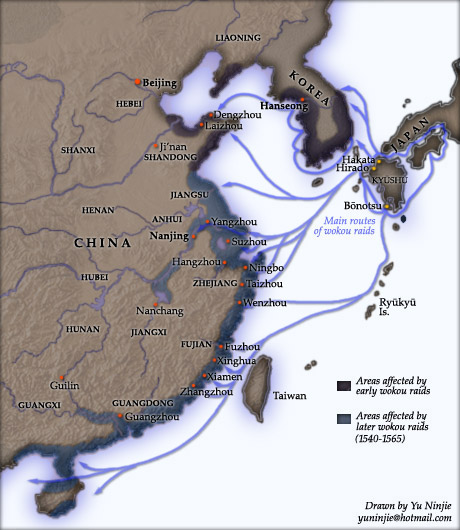
Sixteenth century Japanese pirate raids

During the Qing period, Chinese pirate fleets grew increasingly large. The effects of large-scale piracy on the Chinese economy were immense. They preyed voraciously on China's junk trade, which flourished in Fujian and Guangdong and was a vital artery of Chinese commerce. Pirate fleets exercised hegemony over villages on the coast, collecting revenue by exacting tribute and running extortion rackets. In 1802, the menacing Zheng Yi inherited the fleet of his cousin, captain Zheng Qi, whose death provided Zheng Yi with considerably more influence in the world of piracy. Zheng Yi and his wife, Zheng Yi Sao (who would eventually inherit the leadership of his pirate confederacy), then formed a pirate coalition that, by 1804, consisted of over ten thousand men. The military might of the Guangdong Pirate Confederation was sufficient to combat the Qing navy. It was, however, defeated by the Portuguese Navy at the Battle of the Tigers Mouth, and gradually dismembered until its last pirates surrendered on April 15, 1810. A combination of famine, Qing naval opposition, and internal rifts crippled piracy in China around the 1820s, and it never again reached the same level.

In the 1840s and 1850s, United States Navy and Royal Navy forces campaigned together against Chinese pirates. Major battles were fought such as those at Ty-ho Bay and the Tonkin River though pirate junks continued operating off China for years more. However, some British and American individual citizens also volunteered to serve with Chinese pirates to fight against European forces. The British offered rewards for the capture of Westerners serving with Chinese pirates. During the Second Opium War and the Taiping Rebellion, piratical junks were again destroyed in large numbers by British naval forces, but ultimately it was not until the 1860s and 1870s that fleets of pirate junks ceased to exist.

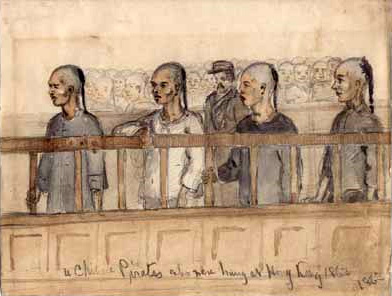
Four Chinese pirates who were hanged in Hong Kong in 1863

Chinese Pirates also plagued the Tonkin Gulf area.

Chinese pirate flag with the bagua and taijitu, captured by George Henry Preble. Circa 1871

==== Piracy in the Ming dynasty ====
Pirates in the Ming era tended to come from populations on the geographic periphery of the state. They were recruited largely from the lower classes of society, including poor fishermen, and many were fleeing from obligatory labor on state-building projects organized by the dynasty. These lower-class men, and sometimes women, may have fled taxation or conscription by the state in search of better opportunities and wealth, and willingly joined local pirate bands. These local, lower-class individuals seem to have felt unrepresented, and traded the small amount of security afforded them from their allegiance to the state for the promise of a relatively improved existence engaging in smuggling or other illegal trade.

Originally, pirates in the coastal areas near Fujian and Zhejiang may have been Japanese, as suggested by the Ming government referring to them as "wokou (倭寇)", but piracy was probably a multi-ethnic profession by the 16th century, although coastal brigands continued to be referred to as wokou in many government documents. Most pirates were probably Han Chinese, but Japanese and even Europeans engaged in pirate activities in the region.

==== Illegal trade and authority ====
Pirates engaged in many different schemes to make a living. Smuggling and illegal trade overseas were major sources of revenue for pirate bands, both large and small. As the Ming government mostly outlawed private trade overseas, at least until the overseas silver trade contributed to a lifting of the ban, pirates could, by default, control the market for any number of foreign goods. The geography of the coastline made chasing pirates quite difficult for the authorities, and private overseas trade began to transform coastal societies by the 15th century, as nearly all aspects of the local society benefitted from or associated with illegal trade. The desire to trade for silver eventually led to open conflict between the Ming and illegal smugglers and pirates. This conflict, along with local merchants in southern China, helped persuade the Ming court to end the haijin ban on private international trade in 1567.

Pirates also projected local political authority. Larger pirate bands could act as local governing bodies for coastal communities, collecting taxes and engaging in "protection" schemes. In addition to illegal goods, pirates ostensibly offered security to communities on land in exchange for a tax. These bands also wrote and codified laws that redistributed wealth, punished crimes, and protected the taxed community. These laws were strictly followed by the pirates, as well. The political structures tended to look similar to the Ming structures.

==== Hierarchy and structure ====
Pirates did not tend to stay pirates permanently. It seems to have been relatively easy both to join and leave a pirate band, and these raiding groups were more interested in maintaining a willing force. Members of these pirate groups did not tend to stay for more than a few months or a year.

There appears to have been a hierarchy in most pirate organizations. Pirate leaders could become very wealthy and powerful, especially when working with the Chinese dynasty, and, consequently, so could those who served under them. These pirate groups were organized similarly to other "escape societies" throughout history, and maintained a redistributive system to reward looting; the pirates directly responsible for looting or pillaging got their cut first, and the rest was allocated to the rest of the pirate community. There seems to be evidence that there was an egalitarian aspect to these communities, with the capability to do the job being rewarded explicitly. The pirates themselves had some special privileges under the law when they interacted with communities on land, mostly in the form of extra allotments of redistributed wealth.

==== Clientele ====
Pirates, of course, had to sell their loot. They had trade relations with local communities and foreign traders in southeastern China. Zhu Wan, who held the office of Grand Coordinator for Coastal Defense, documented that pirates in the region to which he had been sent had the support of the local elite gentry class. These "pirates in gowns and caps" directly or indirectly sponsored pirate activity and certainly directly benefitted from the illegal private trade in the region. When Zhu Wan or other officials from the capital attempted to eliminate the pirate problem, these local elites fought back, having Zhu Wan demoted and eventually even sent back to Beijing to possibly be executed. The gentry who benefitted from illegal maritime trade were too powerful and influential, and they were clearly very invested in the smuggling activities of the pirate community.

In addition to their relationships with the local elite on the coast, pirates also had complex, often friendly relationships and partnerships with the dynasty itself and with international traders. When pirate groups recognized the authority of the dynasty, they would often be allowed to operate freely and even profit from the relationship. There were also opportunities for these pirates to ally themselves with colonial projects from Europe or other overseas powers. Both the dynasty and foreign colonial projects would employ pirates as mercenaries to establish dominance in the coastal region. Because of how difficult it was for established state powers to control these regions, pirates seem to have had a lot of freedom to choose their allies and their preferred markets. Included in this list of possible allies, sea marauders and pirates even found opportunities to bribe military officials as they engaged in illegal trade. They seem to have been incentivized mostly by money and loot, and so could afford to play the field concerning their political or military allies.

Because pirate organizations could be so powerful locally, the Ming government made concerted efforts to weaken them. The presence of colonial projects, however, complicated this, as pirates could ally with other maritime powers or local elites to stay in business. The Chinese government was clearly aware of the power of some of these pirate groups, as some documents even refer to them as "sea rebels," a term that underscores the political nature of piracy. Pirates like Zheng Zhilong and Zheng Chenggong accrued tremendous local power, eventually even being hired as naval commanders by the Chinese dynasties and foreign maritime powers.

=== South Asia ===
Bawarij were Sindhi pirates named for their distinctive barja warships who were active between 251 and 865 AD. Their frequent piracy and the incident in which they looted two treasure ships coming from Ceylon became the casus belli for the Umayyad conquest of Sindh.

Pirates who accepted the Royal Pardon from the Chola Empire would get to serve in the Chola Navy as "Kallarani". They would be used as coast guards, or sent on recon missions to deal with Arab piracy in the Arabian Sea. Their function is similar to that of the 18th-century privateers, used by the Royal Navy.

Starting in the 14th century, the Deccan (Southern Peninsular region of India) was divided into two entities: on the one side stood the Muslim Bahmani Sultanate and on the other stood the Hindu kings rallied around the Vijayanagara Empire. Ongoing wars demanded frequent resupply of fresh horses, which were imported via sea routes from Persia and Africa. This trade was frequently raided by thriving bands of pirates based in the coastal cities of Western India. One of such was Timoji, who operated off Anjadip Island both as a privateer (by seizing horse traders, that he rendered to the raja of Honavar) and as a pirate who attacked the Kerala merchant fleets that traded pepper with Gujarat.

During the 16th and 17th centuries, there was frequent European piracy against Mughal Indian merchants, especially those en route to Mecca for Hajj. The situation came to a head when the Portuguese attacked and captured the vessel Rahimi which belonged to Mariam Zamani the Mughal queen, which led to the Mughal seizure of the Portuguese town Daman. In the 18th century, the famous Maratha privateer Kanhoji Angre ruled the seas between Mumbai and Goa. The Marathas attacked British shipping and insisted that East India Company ships pay taxes if sailing through their waters.

=== Persian Gulf ===
The southern coast of the Persian Gulf was known to the British from the late 18th century as the Pirate Coast, where control of the seaways of the Persian Gulf was asserted by the Qawasim (Al Qasimi) and other local maritime powers. Memories of the privations inflicted on the coast by Portuguese raiders under Albuquerque were long-lasting, and local powers were antagonistic as a consequence of Christian powers asserting dominance over their coastal waters. Early British expeditions to protect the Imperial Indian Ocean trade from competitors, principally the Al Qasimi from Ras Al Khaimah and Lingeh, led to campaigns against those headquarters and other harbours along the coast in 1809 and then, after a relapse in raiding, again in 1819. This led to the signing of the first formal treaty of maritime peace between the British and the rulers of several coastal sheikhdoms in 1820. This was cemented by the Treaty of Maritime Peace in Perpetuity in 1853, resulting in the British label for the area, 'Pirate Coast', being softened to the 'Trucial Coast', with several emirates being recognised by the British as Trucial States.

=== Madagascar ===
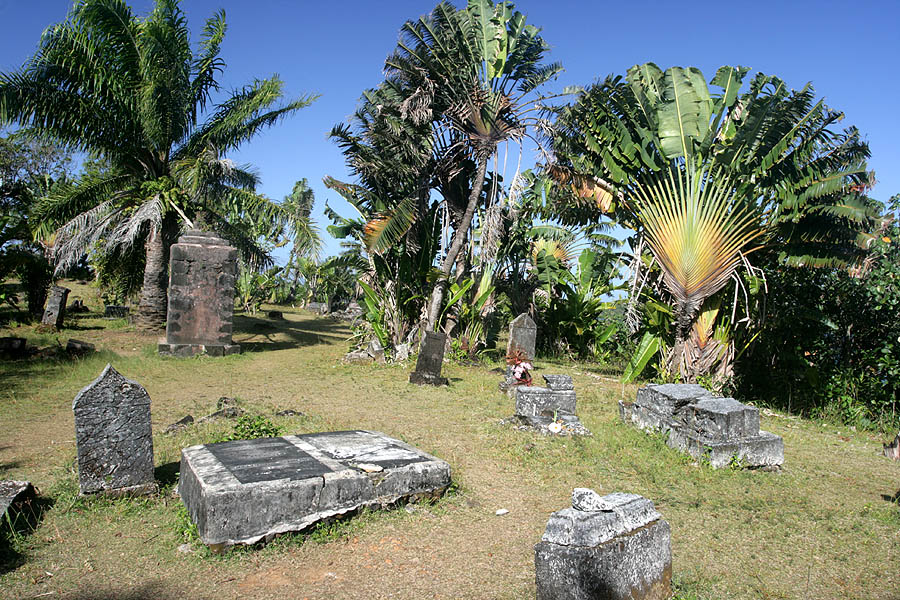
The cemetery of past pirates at Île Ste-Marie (St. Mary's Island)

At one point, there were nearly 1,000 pirates located in Madagascar. Île Sainte-Marie was a popular base for pirates throughout the 17th and 18th centuries. The most famous pirate utopia is that of the probably fictional Captain Misson and his pirate crew, who allegedly founded the free colony of Libertatia in northern Madagascar in the late 17th century, until it was destroyed in a surprise attack by the island natives in 1694.

=== Caribbean ===
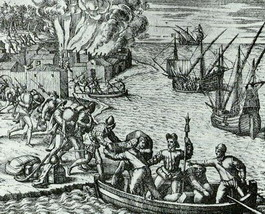
Jacques de Sores looting and burning Havana in 1555

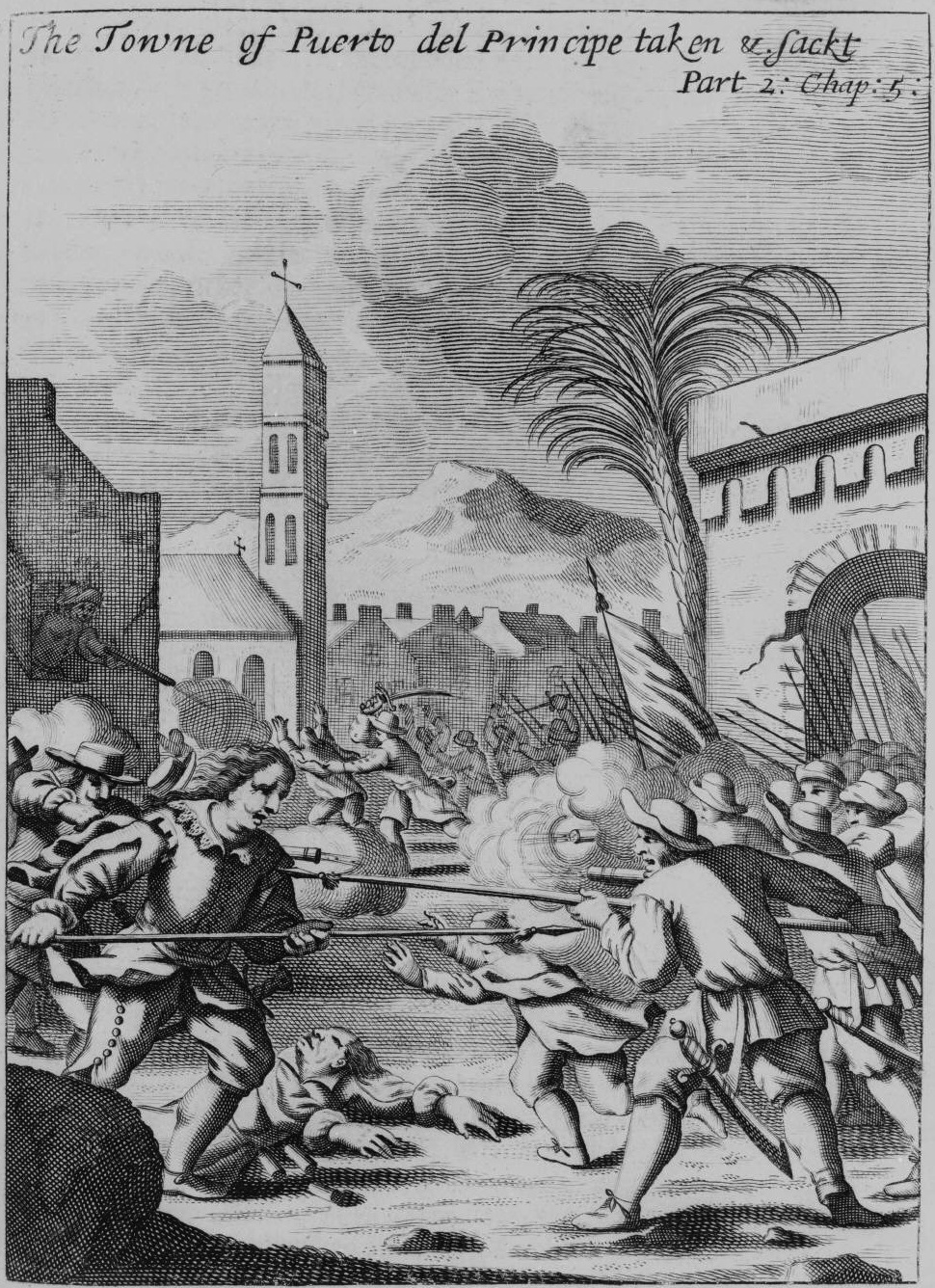
Puerto del Príncipe being sacked in 1668 by Henry Morgan

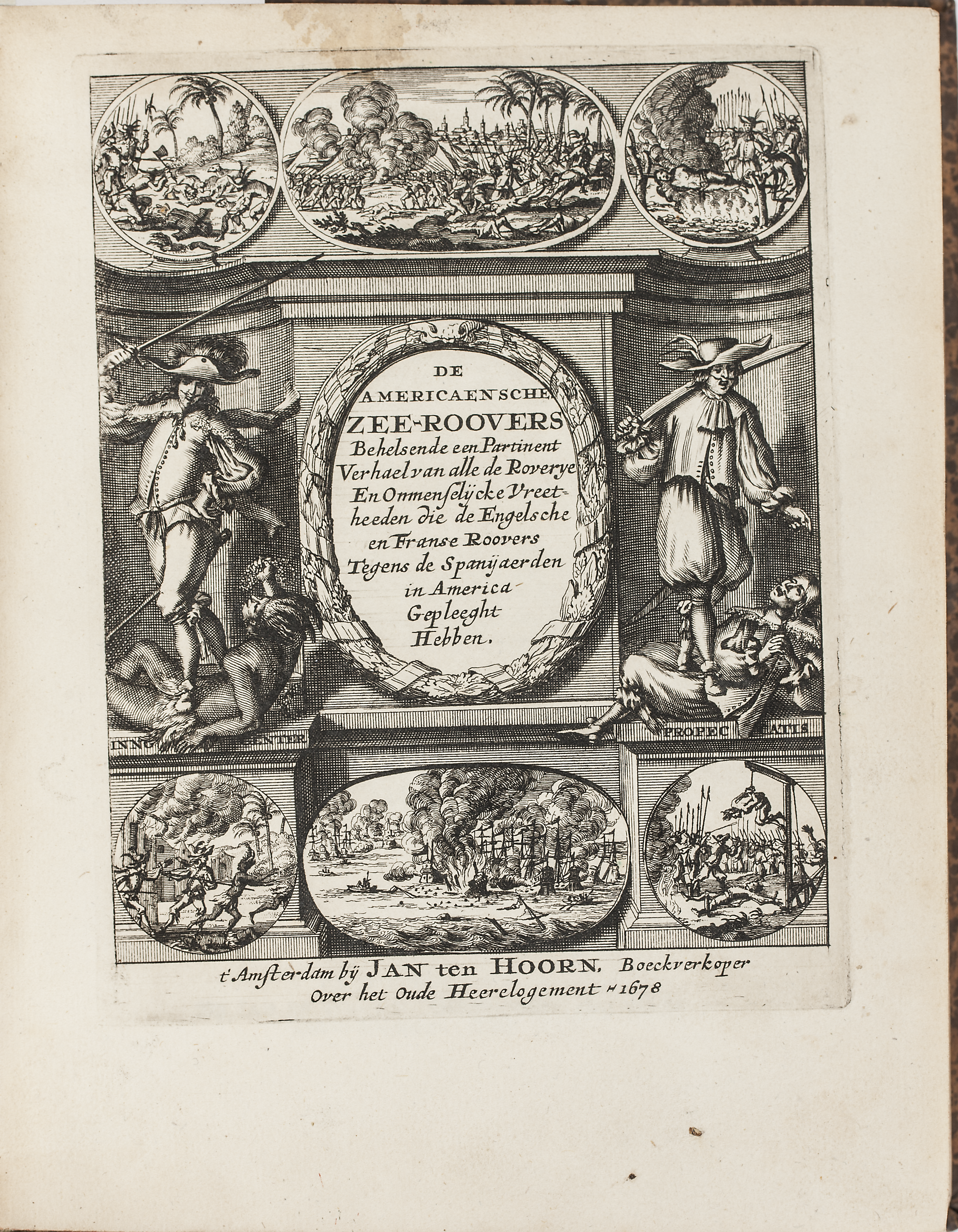
Book about pirates "De Americaensche Zee-Roovers" was first published in 1678 in Amsterdam

The classic era of piracy in the Caribbean lasted from circa 1650 until the mid-1720s. By 1650, France, England and the United Provinces began to develop their colonial empires. This involved considerable seaborne trade, and a general economic improvement: there was money to be made – or stolen – and much of it traveled by ship.

French buccaneers were established on northwestern part of Hispaniola after the devastations of Osorio as early as 1625, but lived at first mostly as hunters rather than robbers; their transition to full-time piracy was gradual and motivated in part by Spanish efforts to wipe out both the buccaneers and the prey animals on which they depended. The buccaneers' migration from Hispaniola's mainland to the more defensible offshore island of Tortuga limited their resources and accelerated their piratical raids. According to Alexandre Exquemelin, a buccaneer and historian who remains a major source for this period, the Tortuga buccaneer Pierre Le Grand pioneered attacks on galleons returning to Spain.

The growth of buccaneering on Tortuga was augmented by the English capture of Jamaica from Spain in 1655. The early English governors of Jamaica freely granted letters of marque to buccaneers in Tortuga and to their own fellow citizens. At the same time, the growth of Port Royal provided these raiders with a far more profitable and enjoyable place to sell their booty. In the 1660s, the new French governor of Tortuga, Bertrand d'Ogeron, similarly issued privateering commissions to both his own colonists and English cutthroats from Port Royal. These conditions brought Caribbean buccaneering to its zenith.

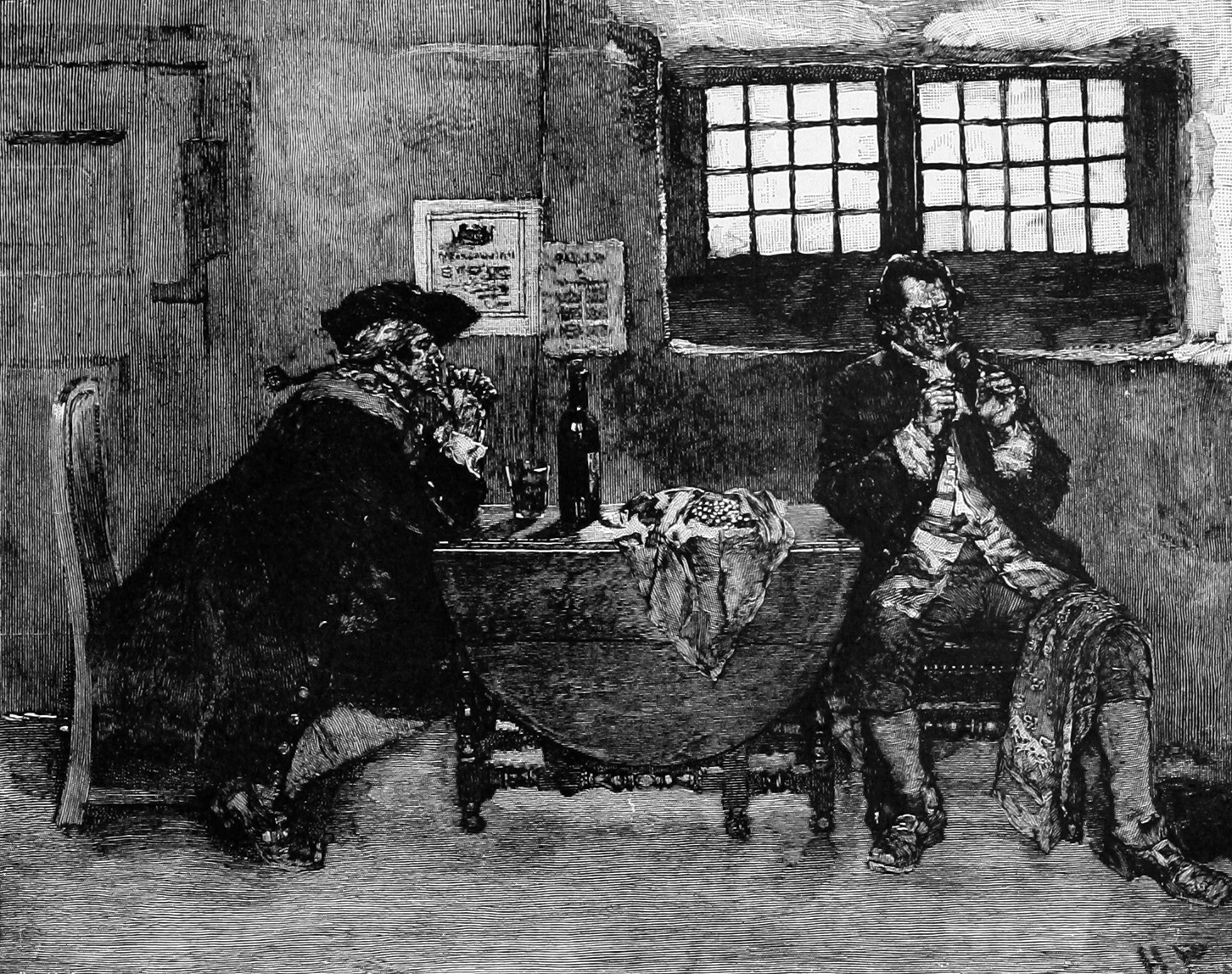
Henry Every is shown selling his loot in this engraving by Howard Pyle. Every's capture of the Grand Mughal ship Ganj-i-Sawai in 1695 stands as one of the most profitable pirate raids ever perpetrated.

A new phase of piracy began in the 1690s as English pirates looked beyond the Caribbean for treasure. The fall of Britain's Stuart kings had restored the traditional enmity between Britain and France, thus ending the profitable collaboration between English Jamaica and French Tortuga. The devastation of Port Royal by an earthquake in 1692 further reduced the Caribbean's attractions by destroying the pirates' chief market for fenced plunder. Caribbean colonial governors began to discard the traditional policy of "no peace beyond the Line," under which it was understood that war would continue (and thus letters of marque would be granted) in the Caribbean regardless of peace treaties signed in Europe; henceforth, commissions would be granted only in wartime, and their limitations would be strictly enforced. Furthermore, much of the Spanish Main had simply been exhausted; Maracaibo alone had been sacked three times between 1667 and 1678, while Río de la Hacha had been raided five times and Tolú eight.

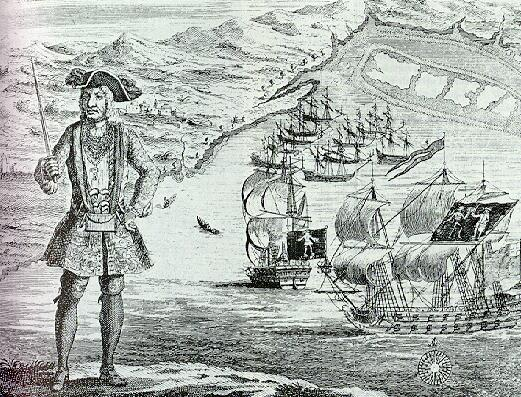
Bartholomew Roberts was the pirate with the most captures during the Golden Age of Piracy. He is now known for hanging the governor of Martinique from the yardarm of his ship.

At the same time, England's less favored colonies, including Bermuda, New York, and Rhode Island, had become cash-starved by the Navigation Acts, which restricted trade with foreign ships. Merchants and governors eager for coin were willing to overlook and even underwrite pirate voyages; one colonial official defended a pirate because he thought it "very harsh to hang people that brings in gold to these provinces." Although some of these pirates operating out of New England and the Middle Colonies targeted Spain's remoter Pacific coast colonies well into the 1690s and beyond, the Indian Ocean was a richer and more tempting target. India's economic output was large during this time, especially in high-value luxury goods like silk and calico which made ideal pirate booty; at the same time, no powerful navies plied the Indian Ocean, leaving both local shipping and the various East India companies' vessels vulnerable to attack. This set the stage for the famous pirates, Thomas Tew, Henry Every, Robert Culliford, and (although his guilt remains controversial) William Kidd.

In 1713 and 1714, a series of peace treaties ended the War of the Spanish Succession. As a result, thousands of seamen, including European privateers who had operated in the West Indies, were relieved of military duty, at a time when cross-Atlantic colonial shipping trade was beginning to boom. In addition, European sailors who had been pushed by unemployment to work onboard merchantmen (including slave ships) were often enthusiastic to abandon that profession and turn to pirating, giving pirate captains a steady pool of recruits from various coasts across the Atlantic.

In 1715, pirates launched a major raid on Spanish divers who were trying to recover gold from a sunken treasure galleon off the coast of Florida. The nucleus of the pirate force was a group of English ex-privateers, all of whom would soon be enshrined in infamy: Henry Jennings, Charles Vane, Samuel Bellamy, and Edward England. The attack was successful, but contrary to their expectations, the governor of Jamaica refused to allow Jennings and their cohorts to spend their loot on his island. With Kingston and the declining Port Royal closed to them, Jennings and his comrades founded a new pirate base at Nassau, on the island of New Providence in the Bahamas, which had been abandoned during the war. Until the arrival of governor Woodes Rogers three years later, Nassau would be home for these pirates and their many recruits.

Shipping traffic between Africa, the Caribbean, and Europe began to soar in the 18th century, following a model known as the triangular trade, and became a rich target for piracy. Trade ships sailed from Europe to the African coast, trading manufactured goods and weapons in exchange for enslaved people. The traders would then sail to the Caribbean to sell the enslaved people, and return to Europe with goods such as sugar, tobacco, and cocoa. Another triangular trade saw ships carry raw materials, preserved cod, and rum to Europe, where a portion of the cargo would be sold for manufactured goods, which (along with the remainder of the original load) were transported to the Caribbean, where they were exchanged for sugar and molasses, which (with some manufactured articles) were borne to New England. Ships in the triangular trade made money at each stop.

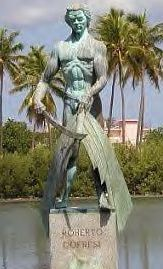
Born to a noble family in Puerto Rico, Roberto Cofresí was the last notably successful pirate in the Caribbean.

As part of the peace settlement of the War of the Spanish succession, Britain obtained the asiento, a Spanish government contract, to supply slaves to Spain's new world colonies, providing British traders and smugglers more access to the traditionally closed Spanish markets in America. This arrangement also contributed heavily to the spread of piracy across the western Atlantic at this time. Shipping to the colonies boomed simultaneously with the flood of skilled mariners after the war. Merchant shippers used the surplus of sailors' labor to drive wages down, cut corners to maximize profits, and create unsavory conditions aboard their vessels. Merchant sailors suffered from mortality rates as high or higher than those of the enslaved people being trafficked (Rediker, 2004). Living conditions were so poor that many sailors began to prefer a freer existence as a pirate. The increased volume of shipping traffic also could sustain a large body of brigands preying upon it. Among the most infamous Caribbean pirates of the time were Edward Teach or Blackbeard, John Rackham, and Bartholomew Roberts. Most of these pirates were eventually hunted down by the Royal Navy and killed or captured; several battles were fought between the brigands and the colonial powers, both on land and at sea.

Piracy in the Caribbean declined over the next several decades after 1730, but by the 1810s, many pirates still roamed the waters, though they were not as bold or successful as their predecessors. The most successful pirates of the era were Jean Lafitte and Roberto Cofresi. Lafitte is considered by many to be the last buccaneer due to his army of pirates and fleet of pirate ships, which held bases in and around the Gulf of Mexico. Lafitte and his men participated in the War of 1812 battle of New Orleans. Cofresi's base was on Mona Island, Puerto Rico, from which he disrupted commerce throughout the region. He became the last major target of the international anti-piracy operations.

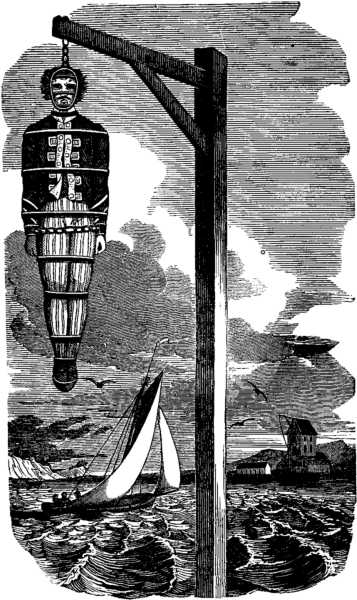
Hanging of Captain Kidd; illustration from The Pirates Own Book (1837)

The elimination of piracy from European waters expanded to the Caribbean in the 18th century, and to West Africa and North America by the 1710s. By the 1720s, even the Indian Ocean was a difficult location for pirates to operate.

England began to strongly turn against piracy at the turn of the 18th century, as it was increasingly damaging to the country's economic and commercial prospects in the region. The Piracy Act 1698 for the "more effectual suppression of Piracy" made it easier to capture, try and convict pirates by lawfully enabling acts of piracy to be "examined, inquired of, tried, heard and determined, and adjudged in any place at sea, or upon the land, in any of his Majesty's islands, plantations, colonies, dominions, forts, or factories." This effectively enabled admirals to hold court sessions to try pirates wherever they deemed necessary, rather than requiring that trials be held in England. Commissioners of these vice-admiralty courts were also vested with "full power and authority" to issue warrants, summon the necessary witnesses, and "to do all thing necessary for the hearing and final determination of any case of piracy, robbery, or felony." These new and faster trials provided no legal representation for the pirates; and ultimately led in this era to the execution of 600 pirates, which represented approximately 10 percent of the pirates active at the time in the Caribbean region. Being an accessory to piracy was also criminalised under the statute.

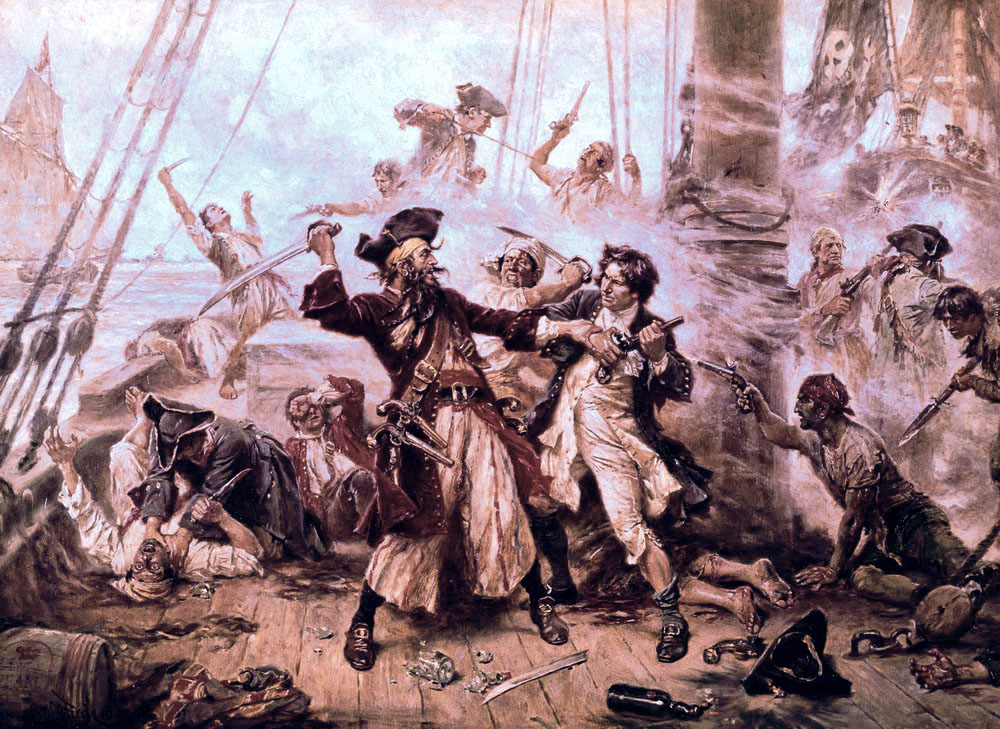
Capture of the Pirate Blackbeard, 1718 depicting the battle between Blackbeard and Robert Maynard in Ocracoke Bay; romanticized depiction by Jean Leon Gerome Ferris from 1920

Piracy saw a brief resurgence between the end of the War of the Spanish Succession in 1713 and around 1720, as many unemployed seafarers turned to piracy to make ends meet amid a postwar surplus of sailors that led to declining wages and working conditions. At the same time, one of the terms of the Treaty of Utrecht that ended the war gave to Great Britain's Royal African Company and other British slavers a thirty-year asiento, or contract, to furnish enslaved Africans to the Spanish colonies, providing British merchants and smugglers potential inroads into the traditionally closed Spanish markets in America and leading to an economic revival for the whole region. This revived Caribbean trade provided rich new pickings for a wave of piracy. Also contributing to the increase in Caribbean piracy at this time was Spain's breakup of the English logwood settlement at Campeche and the allure of a newly sunken silver fleet off the southern Bahamas in 1715. Fears over the rising levels of crime and piracy, political discontent, concern over crowd behaviour at public punishments, and an increased determination by Parliament to suppress piracy, resulted in the Piracy Act 1717 and Piracy Act 1721. These established seven-year penal transportation to North America as a possible punishment for those convicted of lesser felonies, or as a possible sentence to which capital punishment might be commuted by royal pardon. In 1717, a pardon was offered to pirates who surrendered to British authorities.

After 1720, piracy in the classic sense became extremely rare as the Royal Navy implemented increasingly effective anti-piracy measures, making it impossible for any pirate to sustain a career for long. By 1718, the British Royal Navy had approximately 124 vessels, and by 1815, 214; a significant increase from the two vessels England had in 1670. British Royal Navy warships tirelessly hunted down pirate vessels, and almost always won these engagements.

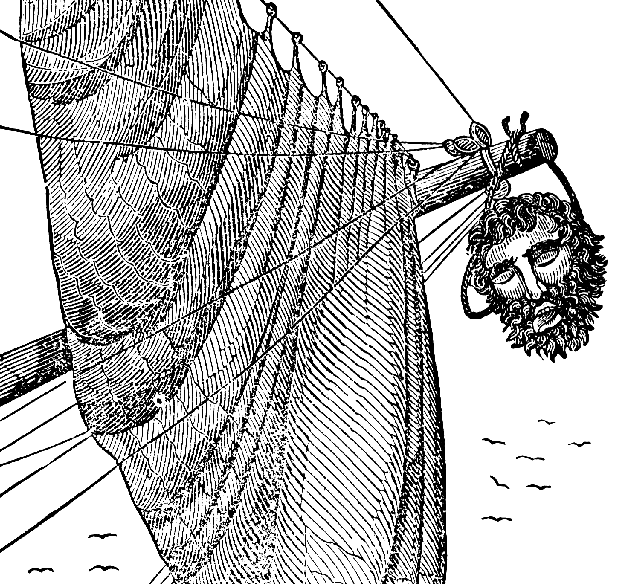
Blackbeard's severed head hanging from Maynard's bowsprit; illustration from The Pirates Own Book (1837)

Many pirates did not surrender and were killed at the point of capture; notorious pirate Edward Teach, or "Blackbeard", was hunted down by Lieutenant Robert Maynard at Ocracoke Inlet off the coast of North Carolina on November 22, 1718, and killed. His flagship was a captured French slave ship known originally as La Concorde; he renamed the frigate Queen Anne's Revenge. Captain Chaloner Ogle of HMS Swallow cornered Bartholomew Roberts in 1722 at Cape Lopez, and a fatal broadside from the Swallow killed the pirate captain instantly. Roberts' death shocked the pirate world, as well as the Royal Navy. The local merchants and civilians had thought him invincible, and some considered him a hero. Roberts' death was seen by many historians as the end of the Golden Age of Piracy. Also crucial to the end of this era of piracy was the loss of the pirates' last Caribbean haven at Nassau.

In the early 19th century, piracy along the East and Gulf Coasts of North America, as well as in the Caribbean, increased again. Jean Lafitte was just one of hundreds of pirates operating in American and Caribbean waters between 1820 and 1835. The United States Navy repeatedly engaged pirates in the Caribbean, Gulf of Mexico, and Mediterranean. Cofresí's El Mosquito was disabled in a collaboration between Spain and the United States. After fleeing for hours, he was ambushed and captured inland. The United States landed shore parties on several Caribbean islands in pursuit of pirates; Cuba was a major haven. By the 1830s, piracy had died out again, and the navies of the region focused on the slave trade.

About the time of the Mexican–American War in 1846, the United States Navy had grown strong and numerous enough to eliminate the pirate threat in the West Indies. By the 1830s, ships had begun to convert to steam propulsion, so the Age of Sail and the classical idea of pirates in the Caribbean ended. Privateering, similar to piracy, continued as a wartime asset for a few more decades and proved important during the naval campaigns of the American Civil War.

Privateering would remain a tool of European states until the mid-19th century, with the Declaration of Paris. But letters of marque were given out much more sparingly by governments and were terminated as soon as conflicts ended. The idea of "no peace beyond the Line" was a relic that had no meaning by the more settled late 18th and early 19th centuries.

=== Canary Islands ===
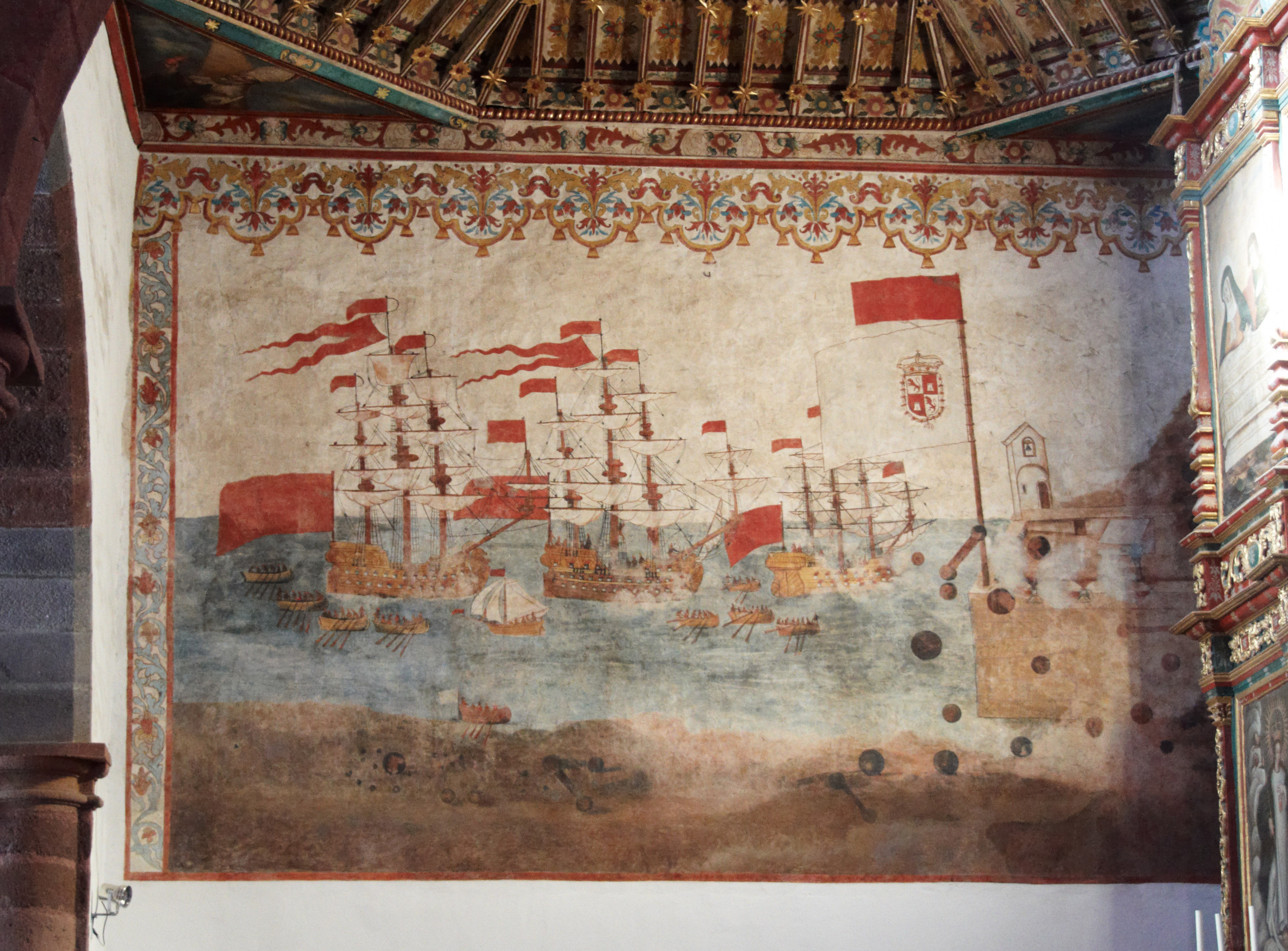
Mural representing the attack of Charles Windon to San Sebastián de La Gomera (1743)

Due to the strategic situation of this Spanish archipelago as a crossroads of maritime routes and commercial bridge between Europe, Africa and America, this was one of the places on the planet with the greatest pirate presence.

In the Canary Islands, the following stand out: the attacks and continuous looting of Berber, English, French and Dutch corsairs sometimes successful and often a failure; and on the other hand, the presence of pirates and corsairs from this archipelago, who made their incursions into the Caribbean. Pirates and corsairs such as François Le Clerc, Jacques de Sores, Francis Drake defeat in Gran Canaria, Pieter van der Does, Murat Reis and Horacio Nelson attacked the islands and was defeated in the Battle of Santa Cruz de Tenerife (1797). Among those born in the archipelago stands out above all Amaro Pargo, whom the monarch Felipe V of Spain frequently benefited in his commercial incursions and corsairs.

Santa Cruz de Tenerife was, especially during the first half of the 18th century, the most important corsair center in the Macaronesian region. The recent discovery of abundant documentary evidence of significant corsair activity, carried out primarily by natives, residents, and islanders, confirms this fact. At the same time, the numerous pirate ships that frequented the Canary Islands' waters used landing places along the coast. Such was the case of Valle de Salazar or San Andrés, which had acquired a reputation as a "pirate port" until the construction of its castle or defensive tower.

=== North America ===
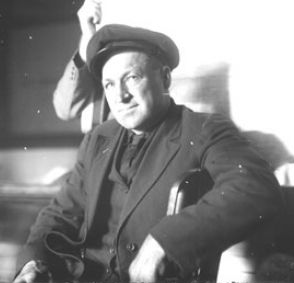
Dan Seavey was a pirate on the Great Lakes in the early 20th century.

Piracy on the east coast of North America first became common in the early seventeenth century, as English privateers discharged after the end of the Anglo-Spanish War (1585–1604) turned to piracy. The most famous and successful of these early pirates was Peter Easton.

River piracy in late 18th-mid-19th century America was primarily concentrated along the Ohio River and Mississippi River valleys. In 1803, at Tower Rock, the U.S. Army dragoons, possibly, from the frontier army post upriver at Fort Kaskaskia, on the Illinois side opposite St. Louis, raided and drove out the river pirates.

Stack Island was also associated with river pirates and counterfeiters in the late 1790s. In 1809, the last major river pirate activity took place on the Upper Mississippi River, and river piracy in this area came to an abrupt end when a group of flatboatmen raided the island, wiping out the river pirates. From 1790 to 1834, Cave-In-Rock was the principal outlaw lair and headquarters of river pirate activity in the Ohio River region, from which Samuel Mason led a gang of river pirates on the Ohio River.

River piracy continued on the lower Mississippi River, from the early 1800s to the mid-1830s, declining as a result of direct military action and local law enforcement and regulator-vigilante groups that uprooted and swept out pockets of outlaw resistance.

"Roaring" Dan Seavey was a pirate active in the early 1900s in the Great Lakes region who joined the United States Marshals Service in later life, working to curb poaching, smuggling, and piracy on Lake Michigan.

== Culture and social structure ==
=== Rewards ===
Pirates had a hierarchical system on board their ships that determined how captured money was distributed. However, pirates were more egalitarian than any other area of employment at the time. In fact, pirate quartermasters were a counterbalance to the captain and had the power to veto his orders. The majority of plunder was in the form of cargo and the ship's equipment, with medicines the most highly prized. A vessel's doctor's chest would be worth anywhere from £300 to £400, or around $470,000 in today's values. Jewels were common plunder but not popular, as they were hard to sell, and pirates, unlike the public of today, had little concept of their value. There is one recorded case in which a pirate was given a large diamond worth far more than the handful of small diamonds he gave his crewmates as a share. He felt cheated and had it broken up to match what they received.

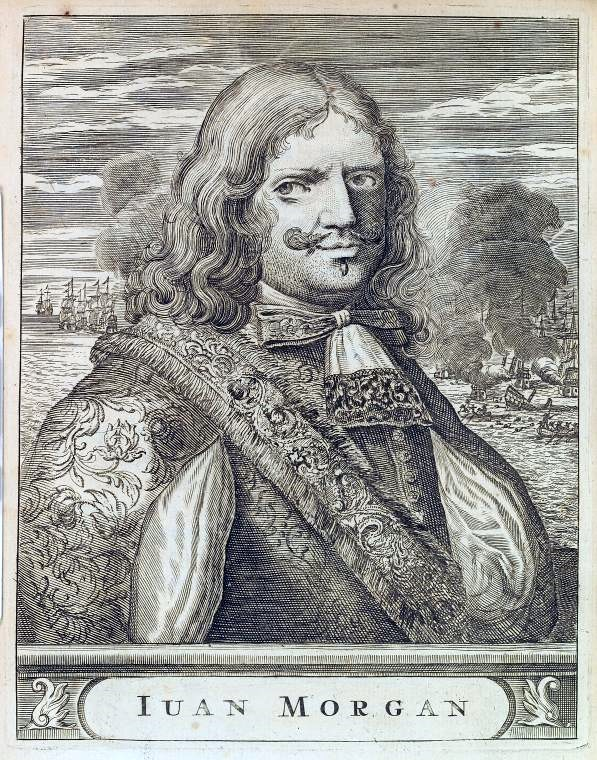
Henry Morgan who sacked and burned the city of Panama in 1671 – the second most important city in the Spanish New World at the time; engraving from 1681 Spanish edition of Alexandre Exquemelin's The Buccaneers of America

Spanish pieces of eight minted in Mexico or Seville were the standard trade currency in the American colonies. However, every colony still used the monetary units of pounds, shillings, and pence for bookkeeping, while Spanish, German, French, and Portuguese money were all standard mediums of exchange, as British law prohibited the export of British silver coinage. Until exchange rates were standardised in the late 18th century, each colony legislated its own exchange rates. In England, 1 piece of eight was worth 4s 3d while it was worth 8s in New York, 7s 6d in Pennsylvania, and 6s 8d in Virginia. One 18th-century English shilling was worth about $58 in modern currency, so a piece of eight could be worth between $246 and $465. As such, the value of pirate plunder could vary considerably, depending on who recorded it and where.

Ordinary seamen received a part of the plunder at the captain's discretion, but usually a single share. On average, a pirate could expect the equivalent of a year's wages as his share from each ship captured while the crew of the most successful pirates would often each receive a share valued at around £1,000 ($1.17 million) at least once in their career. One of the larger amounts taken from a single ship was that by captain Thomas Tew from an Indian merchantman in 1692. Each ordinary seaman on his ship received a share worth £3,000 ($3.5 million), while officers received proportionally larger amounts according to the agreed-upon shares, with Tew himself receiving 2½ shares. It is known that there were actions involving the capture of multiple ships, in which a single share was worth almost double this.

By contrast, an ordinary seaman in the Royal Navy received 19s per month, paid in a lump sum at the end of a tour of duty, which was around half the rate paid in the Merchant Navy. However, corrupt officers would often "tax" their crews' wages to supplement their own, and the Royal Navy of the day was infamous for its reluctance to pay. From this wage, 6d per month was deducted for the maintenance of Greenwich Hospital, with similar amounts deducted for the Chatham Chest, the chaplain, and surgeon. Six months' pay was withheld to discourage desertion. That this was an insufficient incentive is revealed in a report on proposed changes to the RN, written by Admiral Nelson in 1803; he noted that since 1793, more than 42,000 sailors had deserted. Roughly half of all RN crews were pressganged, and these not only received lower wages than volunteers but were shackled while the vessel was docked and were never permitted to go ashore until released from service.

Although the Royal Navy suffered from many morale issues, it addressed the question of prize money through the Cruizers and Convoys Act 1708, which transferred the share previously held by the Crown to the ship's captors. Technically, it was still possible for the Crown to get the money or a portion of it, but this rarely happened. The condemnation of a captured vessel, its cargo, and its men was submitted to the High Court of the Admiralty, and this process remained in force, with minor changes, throughout the Revolutionary and Napoleonic Wars.

Ship prize shares
Rank	Pre 1808	Post 1808
Captain	3/8	2/8
Admiral of fleet	1/8	1/8
Sailing Master & Lieutenants & Captain of Marines	1/8	1/8
Warrant Officers	1/8	1/8
Wardroom Warrant officers & Petty Officers	1/8	1/8
Gunners, Sailors	1/8	2/8

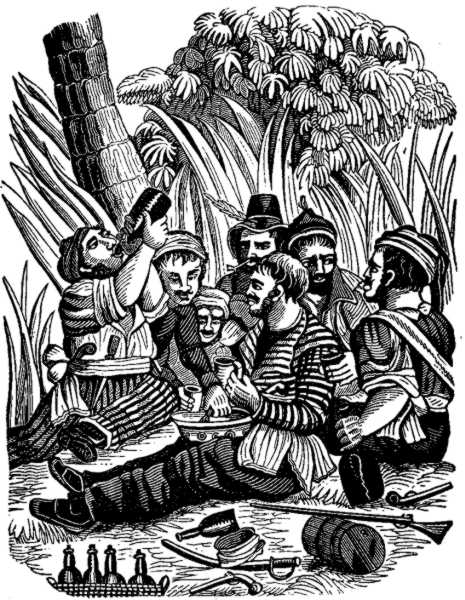
Bartholomew Roberts' crew carousing at the Calabar River; illustration from The Pirates Own Book (1837). Roberts is estimated to have captured over 470 vessels.

Even the flag officer's share was not quite straightforward; he would only get the full one-eighth if he had no junior flag officer beneath him. If this were the case, then he would get a third share. If he had more than one, then he would take one-half while the rest was shared out equally.

There was a great deal of money to be made in this way. The record breaker was the capture of the Spanish frigate Hermione in 1762, which was carrying treasure. The value of this was so great that each seaman netted £485 ($1.4 million in 2008 dollars). The two captains responsible, Evans and Pownall, received £65,000 each ($188.4 million). In January 1807, the frigate Caroline took the Spanish San Rafael, which brought in £52,000 for her captain, Peter Rainier (who had been only a midshipman some thirteen months before). All through the wars, there are examples of this kind of luck falling on captains. Another famous 'capture' was that of the Spanish frigates Thetis and Santa Brigada, which were loaded with gold specie. They were taken by four British frigates, who shared the money, each captain receiving £40,730. Each lieutenant got £5,091, the Warrant Officer group £2,468, the midshipmen £791, and the individual seamen £182.

It should also be noted that it was usually only the frigates that took prizes; the ships of the line were far too ponderous to be able to chase and capture the smaller ships that generally carried treasure. Nelson always bemoaned that he had done badly out of prize money and that, even as a flag officer, he received little. This was not that he had a bad command of captains, but rather that British mastery of the seas was so complete that few enemy ships dared to sail.

Comparison chart using the share distribution known for three pirates against the shares for a Privateer and wages as paid by the Royal Navy.
Rank	Bartholomew Roberts	George Lowther	William Phillips	Privateer (Sir William Monson)	Royal Navy (per month)
Captain	2 shares	2 shares	1.5 shares	10 shares	£8, 8s
Master	1.5 shares	1.5 shares	1.25 shares	7 or 8 shares	£4
Boatswain	1.5 shares	1.25 shares	1.25 shares	5 shares	£2
Gunner	1.5 shares	1.25 shares	1.25 shares	5 shares	£2
Quartermaster	2 shares			4 shares	£1, 6s
Carpenter			1.25 shares	5 shares	£2
Mate		1.25 shares		5 shares	£2, 2s
Doctor		1.25 shares		5 shares	£5 +2d per man aboard
"Other Officers"	1.25 shares			various rates	various rates
Able Seamen (2 yrs experience); Ordinary Seamen (some exp); Landsmen (pressganged)	1 share	1 share	1 share		22s 19s 11s

=== Loot ===
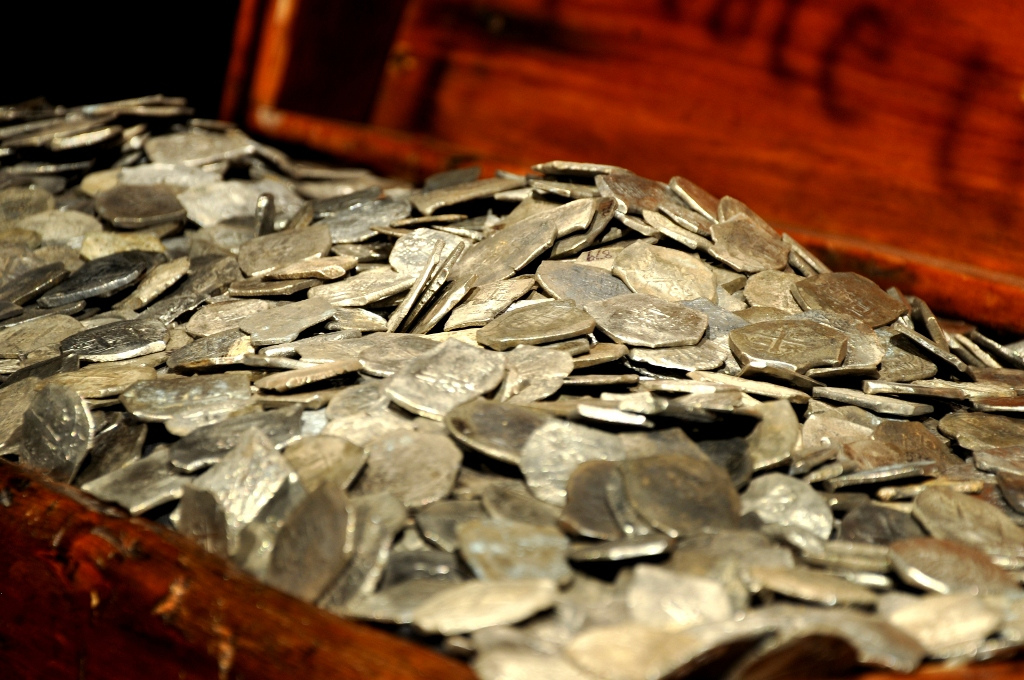
Pirate treasure looted by Samuel Bellamy and recovered from the wreck of the Whydah; exhibit at the Houston Museum of Natural Science, 2010

Even though pirates raided many ships, few, if any, buried their treasure. Often, the "treasure" that was stolen was food, water, alcohol, weapons, or clothing. Other things they stole were household items like bits of soap and gear like rope and anchors, or sometimes they would keep the ship they captured (either to sell off or keep because it was better than their ship). Such items were likely to be needed immediately, rather than saved for future trade. For this reason, the pirates did not need to bury these goods. Pirates tended to kill a few people aboard the ships they captured; usually, they would kill no one if the ship surrendered, because if it became known that pirates took no prisoners, their victims would fight to the last breath, making victory both very difficult and costly in lives. In contrast, ships would quickly surrender if they knew they would be spared. In one well-documented case, 300 heavily armed soldiers on a ship attacked by Thomas Tew surrendered after a brief battle with none of Tew's 40-man crew being injured.

=== Punishment ===
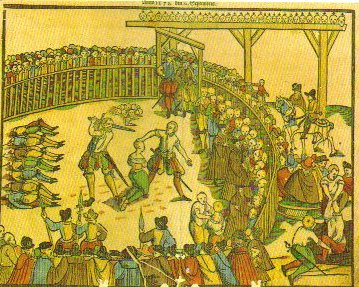
A contemporary flyer depicting the public execution of 16th-century pirate Klein Henszlein and his crew in 1573

During the 17th and 18th centuries, once pirates were caught, justice was meted out in a summary fashion, and many ended their lives by "dancing the hempen jig", a euphemism for hanging. Public executions were a form of entertainment at the time, and people came out to watch them as they would at a sporting event today. Newspapers reported details such as condemned men's last words, the prayers said by the priests, and descriptions of their final moments on the gallows. In England, most of these executions took place at Execution Dock on the River Thames in London.

In the cases of more famous prisoners, usually captains, their punishments extended beyond death. Their bodies were enclosed in iron cages (gibbet) (for which they were measured before their execution) and left to swing in the air until the flesh rotted off them- a process that could take as long as two years. The bodies of captains such as William "Captain" Kidd, Charles Vane, William Fly, and John Rackham were all treated this manner.

=== Role of women ===
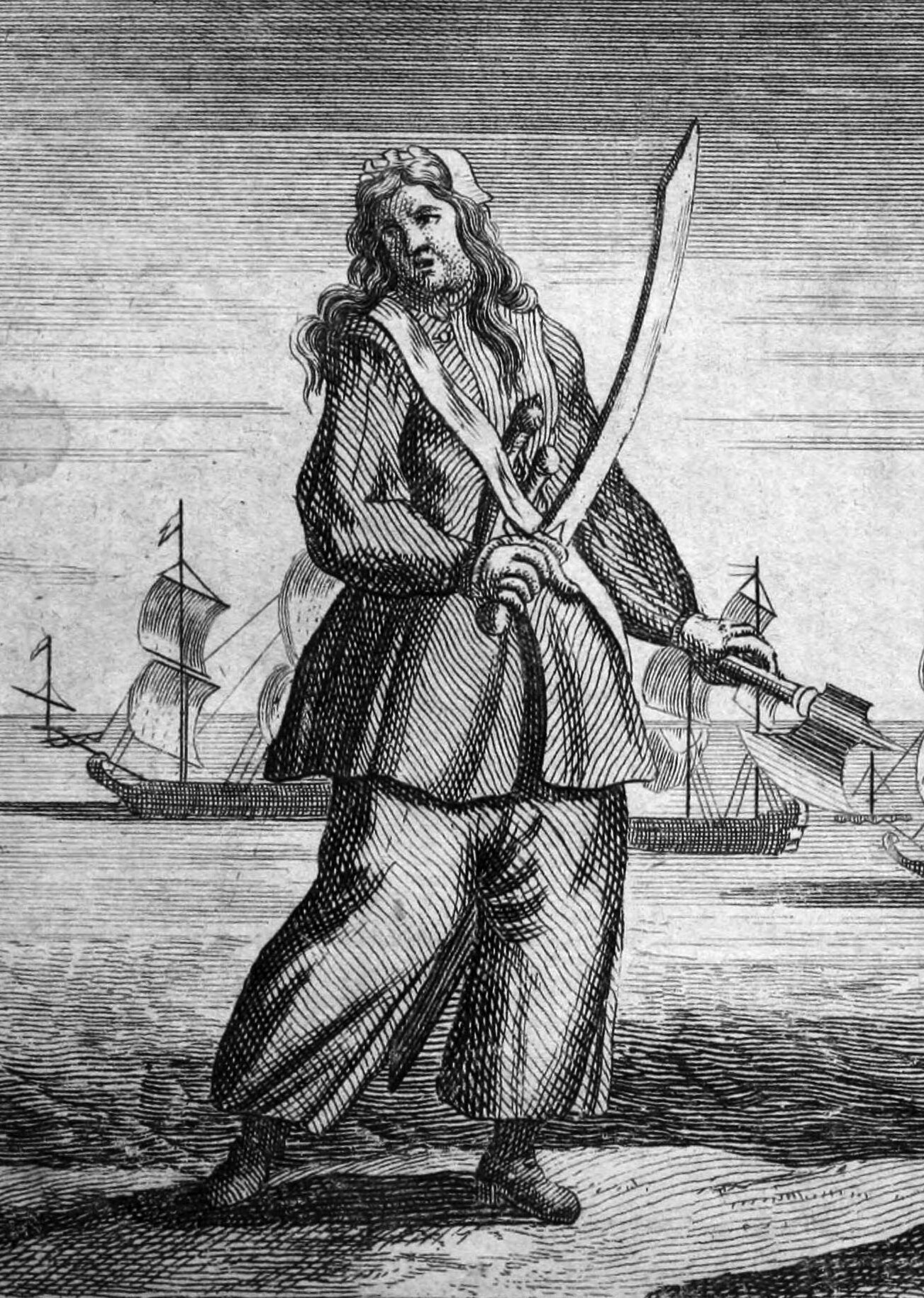
1724 engraving of Bonny from A General History of the Pyrates

While piracy was predominantly a male occupation throughout history, a minority of pirates were female. Pirates did not allow women onto their ships very often. Additionally, women were often regarded as bad luck among pirates. It was feared that the male members of the crew would argue and fight over the women. On many ships, women (as well as young boys) were prohibited by the ship's contract, which all crew members were required to sign.

Only four female pirates are known to have been active during the Golden Age of Piracy. They were Anne Bonny and Mary Read, women who served under John Rackham in 1720, Mary Critchett, an escaped prisoner in 1729, and Martha Farley, the wife of a minor pirate in 1727.

=== Democracy among Caribbean pirates ===
Unlike traditional Western societies of the time, many Caribbean pirate crews of European descent operated as limited democracies. Pirate communities were among the first to establish a system of checks and balances similar to that used by present-day democracies. The first record of such a government aboard a pirate sloop dates to the 17th century.

== Known pirate shipwrecks ==
To date, the following identifiable pirate shipwrecks have been discovered:

- Whydah Gally (discovered in 1984), a former slave ship seized on its maiden voyage from Africa by the pirate captain Samuel Bellamy. The wreck was found off the coast of Cape Cod, Massachusetts, buried under 10 ft (3 m) to 50 ft (15 m) feet of sand, in depths ranging from 16 ft (5 m) to 30 ft (9 m) feet deep, spread for four miles, parallel to the Cape's easternmost coast. With the discovery of the ship's bell in 1985 and a small brass placard in 2013, both inscribed with the ship's name and maiden voyage date, the Whydah is the only fully authenticated Golden Age pirate shipwreck ever discovered. Since 2007, the Wydah collection has been touring as part of the exhibit "Real Pirates" sponsored by National Geographic.
- Queen Anne's Revenge (discovered in 1996), the flagship of the infamous pirate Blackbeard. He used the ship for less than a year, but it was an effective tool in his prize-taking. In June 1718, Blackbeard ran the ship aground at Topsail Inlet, now known as Beaufort Inlet, North Carolina. Intersal, a private firm working under a permit with the state of North Carolina, discovered the remains of the vessel in 28 feet (8.5m) of water about one mile (1.6 km) offshore of Fort Macon State Park, Atlantic Beach, North Carolina. Thirty-one cannons have been identified to date, and more than 250,000 artifacts have been recovered. The cannons are of different origins (such as English, Swedish, and possibly French) and different sizes, as would be expected with a colonial pirate crew.
- Golden Fleece (discovered in 2009), the ship of the notorious English pirate Joseph Bannister, which was found by the American shipwreck hunters John Chatterton and John Mattera in the Dominican Republic, at Samaná Bay. The discovery is recounted in Robert Kurson's book Pirate Hunters (2015).

== Privateers ==
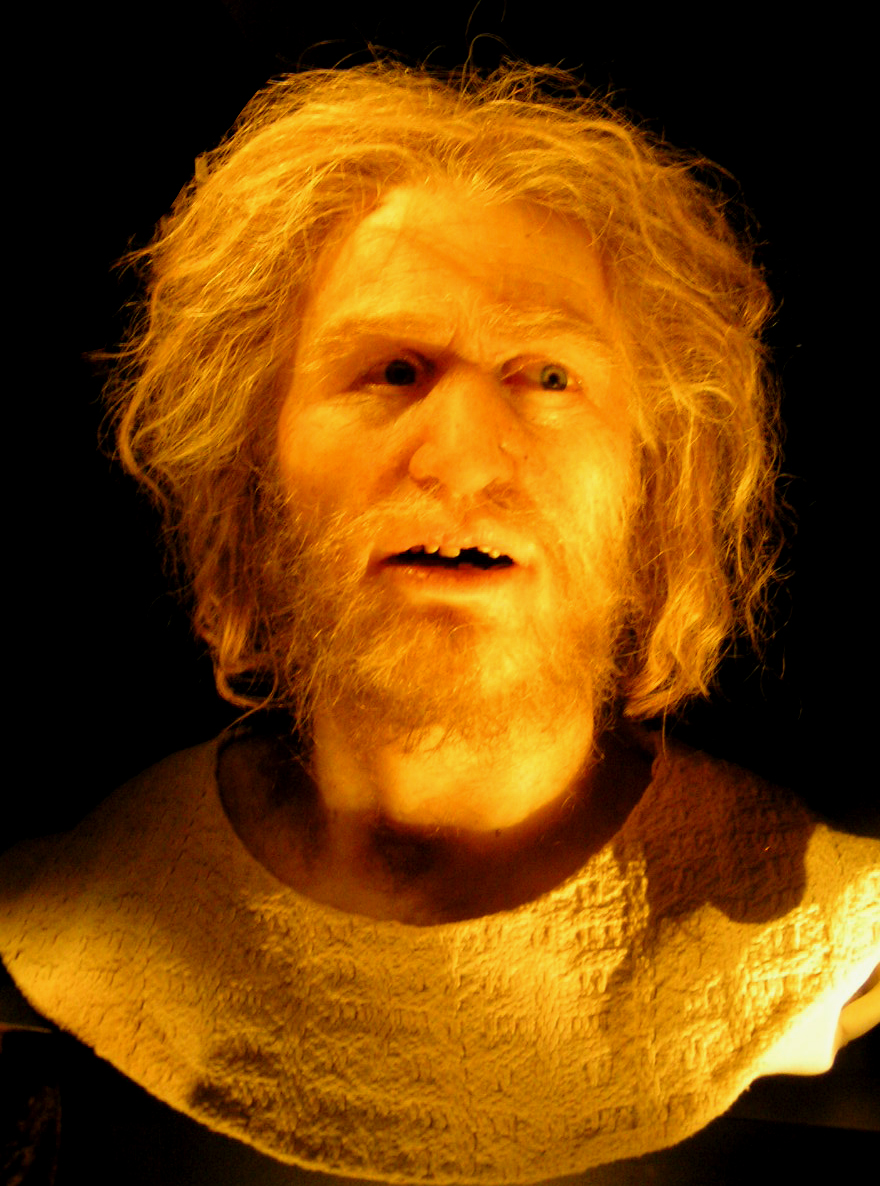
Modern reconstruction of skull alleged to have belonged to 14th century pirate Klaus Störtebeker. He was the leader of the privateer guild Victual Brothers, who later turned to piracy and roamed European seas.

A privateer or corsair used similar methods to a pirate, but acted under orders of the state while in possession of a commission or letter of marque and reprisal from a government or monarch authorizing the capture of merchant ships belonging to an enemy nation. For example, the United States Constitution of 1787 specifically authorized Congress to issue letters of marque and reprisal. The letter of marque and reprisal was recognized by international convention and meant that a privateer could not technically be charged with piracy while attacking the targets named in his commission. This nicety of law did not always save the individuals concerned, however, since whether one was considered a pirate or a legally operating privateer often depended on whose custody the individual found himself in—that of the country that had issued the commission, or that of the object of attack. Spanish authorities were known to execute foreign privateers with their letters of marque hung around their necks to emphasize Spain's rejection of such defenses. Furthermore, many privateers exceeded the bounds of their letters of marque by attacking nations with which their sovereign was at peace (Thomas Tew and William Kidd are notable alleged examples). They thus made themselves liable to conviction for piracy. However, a letter of marque did provide some cover for such pirates, as plunder seized from neutral or friendly shipping could be passed off later as taken from enemy merchants.

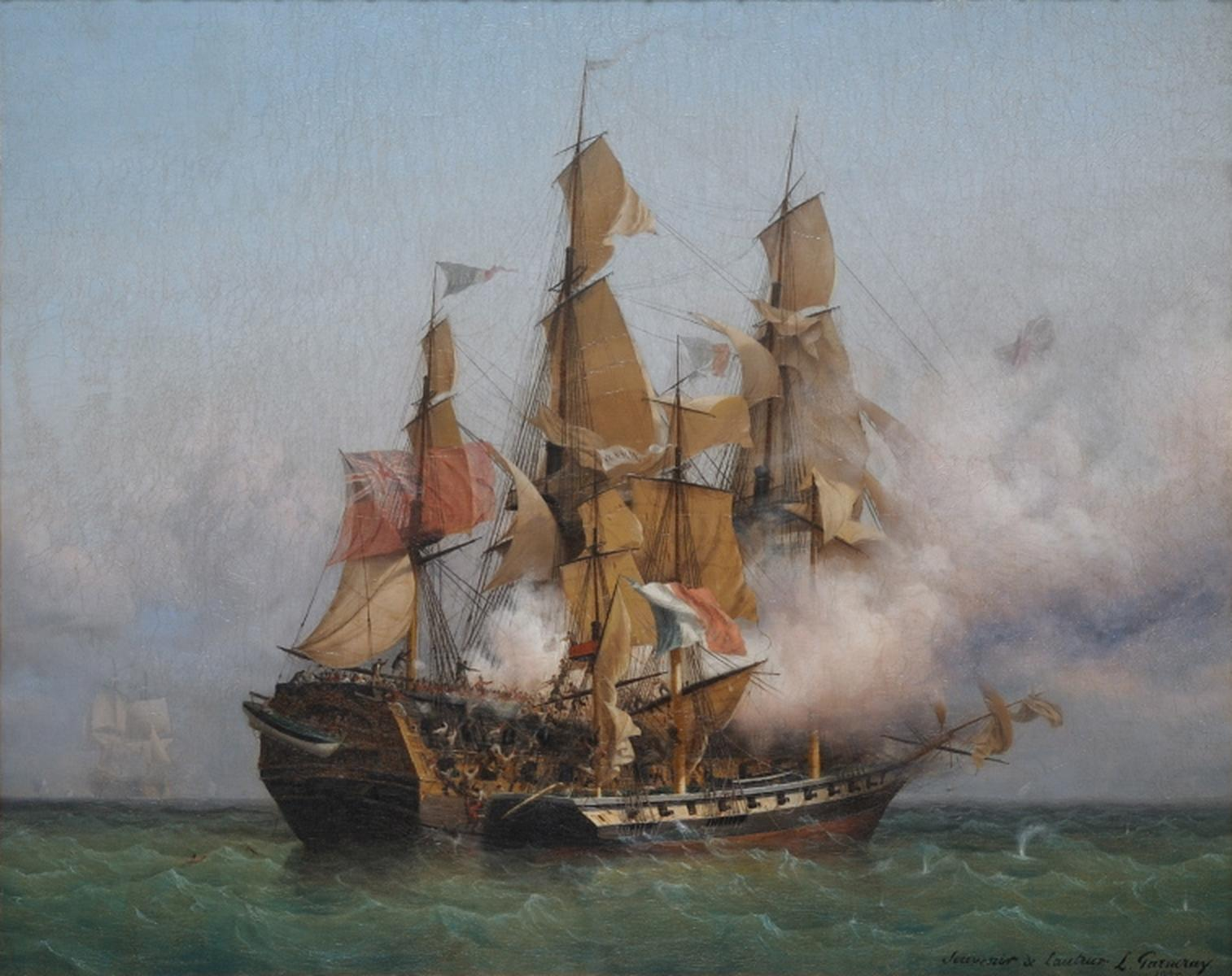
Kent battling Confiance, a privateer vessel commanded by French corsair Robert Surcouf in October 1800, as depicted in a painting by Garneray

The famous Barbary corsairs of the Mediterranean, authorized by the Ottoman Empire, were privateers, as were the Maltese corsairs, who were authorized by the Knights of St. John, and the Dunkirkers in the service of the Spanish Empire. In the years 1626–1634 alone, the Dunkirk privateers captured 1,499 ships, and sank another 336. From 1609 to 1616, England lost 466 merchant ships to Barbary pirates, and Algerians captured 160 British ships between 1677 and 1680. One famous privateer was Sir Francis Drake. His patron was Queen Elizabeth I, and their relationship ultimately proved to be quite profitable for England.

Privateers constituted a large proportion of the total military force at sea during the 17th and 18th centuries. During the Nine Years War, the French adopted a policy of strongly encouraging privateers (French corsairs), including the famous Jean Bart, to attack English and Dutch shipping. England lost roughly 4,000 merchant ships during the war. In the following War of Spanish Succession, privateer attacks continued, Britain losing 3,250 merchant ships. During the War of Austrian Succession, Britain lost 3,238 merchant ships, and France lost 3,434 merchant ships to the British.

During King George's War, approximately 36,000 Americans served aboard privateers at one time or another. During the American Revolution, about 55,000 American seamen served aboard the privateers. The American privateers had almost 1,700 ships, and they captured 2,283 enemy ships. Between the end of the Revolutionary War and 1812, less than 30 years, Britain, France, Naples, the Barbary states, Spain, and the Netherlands seized approximately 2,500 American ships. Payments in ransom and tribute to the Barbary states amounted to 20% of the United States government's annual revenues in 1800. Throughout the American Civil War, Confederate privateers successfully harassed Union merchant ships.

Privateering lost international sanction under the Declaration of Paris in 1856.

== Commerce raiders ==
A wartime activity similar to piracy involves disguised warships called commerce raiders or merchant raiders, which attack enemy shipping commerce, approaching by stealth and then opening fire. Commerce raiders operated successfully during the American Revolution. During the American Civil War, the Confederacy sent out several commerce raiders, the most famous of which was the CSS Alabama. During World War I and World War II, Germany also made use of these tactics, both in the Atlantic and Indian Oceans. Since commissioned naval vessels were openly used, these commerce raiders should not be considered even privateers, much less pirates, although the opposing combatants were vocal in denouncing them as such.

== Contemporary piracy ==
Seaborne piracy against transport vessels is a significant issue, with estimated worldwide losses of US$16 billion per year in 2004, increased to US$25 billion over the next 20 years. Waters between the Red Sea and Indian Ocean, off the Somali coast, and also in the Strait of Malacca and Singapore, are used by over 50,000 commercial ships a year. In the Gulf of Guinea, maritime piracy has also put pressure on offshore oil and gas production, and the security of offshore installations and supply vessels is often paid for by oil companies rather than the respective governments. In the late 2000s, the emergence of piracy off the coast of Somalia spurred a multi-national effort led by the United States to patrol the waters near the Horn of Africa. In 2011, Brazil also created an anti-piracy unit on the Amazon River. Sir Peter Blake, a New Zealand world champion yachtsman, was killed by pirates on the Amazon river in 2001.

In the European Union, vessels suffer river piracy, with attacks on the Serbian and Romanian stretches of the Danube river, an international waterway.

Map showing the extent of Somali pirate attacks on shipping vessels between 2005 and 2010

Modern pirates favor small boats and exploit the limited crew sizes on modern cargo vessels. They also use large vessels to supply the smaller attack/boarding vessels. Modern pirates can be successful because a large share of international commerce occurs by sea. Major shipping routes take cargo ships through narrow bodies of water such as the Gulf of Aden and the Strait of Malacca making them vulnerable to be overtaken and boarded by small motorboats. Other active areas include the South China Sea and the Niger Delta. As usage increases, many of these ships have to lower cruising speeds to allow for navigation and traffic control, making them prime targets for piracy.

Also, pirates often operate in regions of poor, developing, or struggling countries with small or nonexistent navies and along major trade routes. Pirates sometimes evade capture by sailing into waters controlled by their pursuer's enemies. With the end of the Cold War, navies have decreased in size and patrol less frequently, while trade has increased, making organized piracy far easier. Modern pirates are sometimes linked to organized crime syndicates, but are often small, individual groups.

The International Maritime Bureau (IMB) maintains statistics regarding pirate attacks dating back to 1995. Their records indicate hostage-taking overwhelmingly dominates the types of violence against seafarers. For example, in 2006, there were 239 attacks, 77 crew members were kidnapped and 188 taken hostage but only 15 of the pirate attacks resulted in murder. In 2007 the attacks rose by 10 percent to 263 attacks. There was a 35 percent increase in reported attacks involving guns. Crew members who were injured numbered 64 compared to just 17 in 2006. That number does not include instances of hostage taking and kidnapping where the victims were not injured.

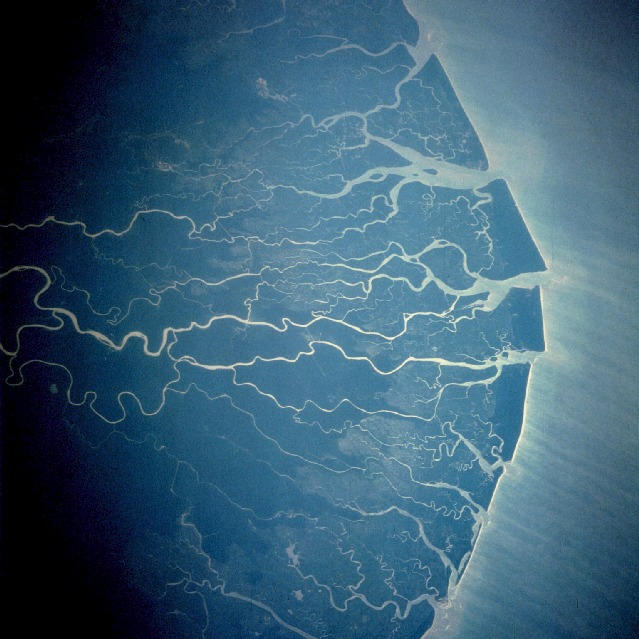
Aerial photograph of the Niger Delta, a center of piracy

The number of attacks from January to September 2009 had surpassed the previous year's total due to the increased pirate attacks in the Gulf of Aden and off Somalia. Between January and September, the number of attacks rose from 293 to 306. Pirates boarded the vessels in 114 cases and hijacked 34. Gun use in pirate attacks increased to 176 cases from 76 in 2008.

Rather than cargo, modern pirates have targeted the crew's personal belongings and the contents of the ship's safe, which may contain large amounts of cash needed for payroll and port fees. In other cases, the pirates force the crew off the ship and then sail it to a port to be repainted and given a new identity through false papers purchased from corrupt or complicit officials.

Modern piracy can occur amid political unrest. For example, following the U.S. withdrawal from Vietnam, Thai piracy was aimed at the many Vietnamese who took to boats to escape. Further, following the disintegration of the government of Somalia, warlords in the region have attacked ships delivering UN food aid.

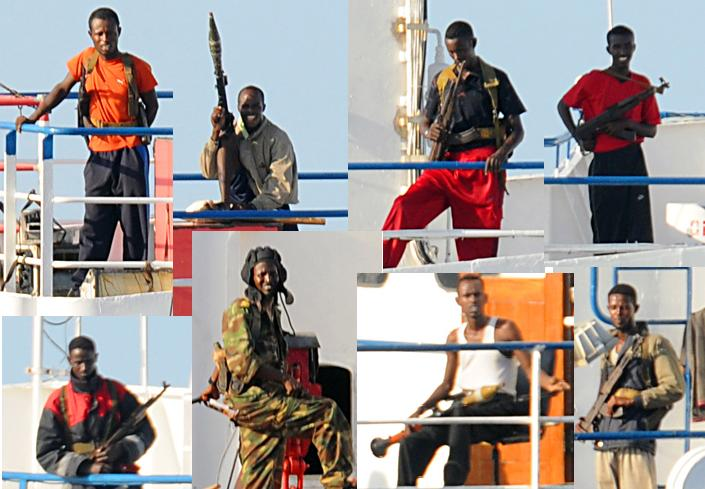
A collage of Somali pirates armed with AKM assault rifles, RPG-7 rocket-propelled grenade launchers and semi-automatic pistols in 2008

The attack against the German-built cruise ship the Seabourn Spirit offshore of Somalia in November 2005 is an example of the sophisticated pirates mariners face. The pirates carried out their attack more than 100 miles (160 km) offshore with speedboats launched from a larger mother ship. The attackers were armed with automatic firearms and an RPG.

Since 2008, Somali pirates centered in the Gulf of Aden made about $120 million annually, reportedly costing the shipping industry between $900 million and $3.3 billion per year. By September 2012, the heyday of piracy in the Indian Ocean was reportedly over. Backers were now reportedly reluctant to finance pirate expeditions due to the low success rate, and pirates were no longer able to repay their creditors. According to the International Maritime Bureau, pirate attacks had by October 2012 dropped to a six-year low. Only five ships were captured by the end of the year, representing a decrease from 25 in 2011 and 27 in 2010, with only one ship attacked in the third quarter compared to 36 during the same period in 2011. However, pirate incidents off the West African seaboard increased to 34 from 30 the previous year, and attacks off the coast of Indonesia rose from 2011's total of 46 to 51.

Many nations forbid ships from entering their territorial waters or ports if the crew is armed, in an effort to deter piracy. Shipping companies sometimes hire private armed security guards.

Modern definitions of piracy include the following acts:

- Boarding without permission.
- Extortion
- Hostage taking
- Kidnapping of people for ransom
- Murder
- Cargo theft
- Robbery and seizure of items on the ship
- Sabotage resulting in the ship subsequently sinking
- Shipwrecking done intentionally to a ship

Together with treason and counterfeiting; piracy, including acts against the law of nations, is one of three criminal offenses against which the United States Congress is delegated power to enact penal legislation by the Constitution of the United States.

In modern times, ships and airplanes are hijacked for political reasons as well. The perpetrators of these acts could be described as pirates (for instance, the French term for plane hijacker is pirate de l'air, literally air pirate), but in English are usually termed hijackers. An example is the hijacking of the Italian civilian passenger ship Achille Lauro by the Palestine Liberation Organization in 1985, which is regarded as an act of piracy. A 2009 book entitled International Legal Dimension of Terrorism called the attackers "terrorists".

Modern pirates also use a great deal of technology. It has been reported that crimes of piracy have involved the use of mobile phones, satellite phones, GPS, machetes, AK74 rifles, sonar systems, modern speedboats, shotguns, pistols, mounted machine guns, and even RPGs and grenade launchers.

In 2020, piracy increased by 24% after being at its lowest 21st-century level in 2019. The Americas and Africa have been identified by the International Chamber of Commerce as the most vulnerable to piracy due to less-wealthy governments in these regions being unable to combat it effectively.

IMB Piracy Reporting Centre keeps a live piracy map to help keep track of all recent piracy and armed robbery incidents.

In 2026, Israel intercepted the Global Sumud Flotilla, a group of 70 boats carrying humanitarian aid to Gaza, in international waters near Greece, kidnapping around 200 activists.

== Anti-piracy measures ==
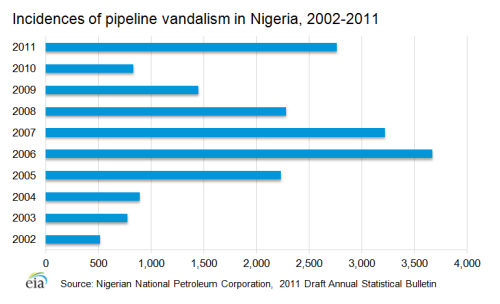
Incidents of pipeline vandalism by pirates in the Gulf of Guinea, 2002–2011

Under a principle of international law known as the "universality principle", a government may "exercise jurisdiction over conduct outside its territory if that conduct is universally dangerous to states and their nationals." The rationale behind the universality principle is that states will punish certain acts "wherever they may occur as a means of protecting the global community as a whole, even absent a link between the state and the parties or the acts in question." Under this principle, the concept of "universal jurisdiction" applies to the crime of piracy. For example, the United States has a statute (section 1651 of title 18 of the United States Code) imposing a sentence of life in prison for piracy "as defined by the law of nations" committed anywhere on the high seas, regardless of the nationality of the pirates or the victims.

The goal of maritime security operations is "actively to deter, disrupt and suppress piracy to protect global maritime security and secure freedom of navigation for the benefit of all nations", and pirates are often detained, interrogated, disarmed, and released. With millions of dollars at stake, pirates have little incentive to stop. In Finland, one case involved pirates who had been captured and whose boat was sunk. As the pirates attacked a vessel of Singapore, not Finland, and are not themselves EU or Finnish citizens, they were not prosecuted. A further complication in many cases, including this one, is that many countries do not allow the extradition of people to jurisdictions where they may be sentenced to death or torture.

The Dutch are using a 17th-century law against sea robbery to prosecute. Warships that capture pirates have no jurisdiction to try them, and NATO does not have a detention policy in place. Prosecutors have a hard time assembling witnesses and securing translators, and countries are reluctant to imprison pirates because they would be saddled with the pirates upon their release.

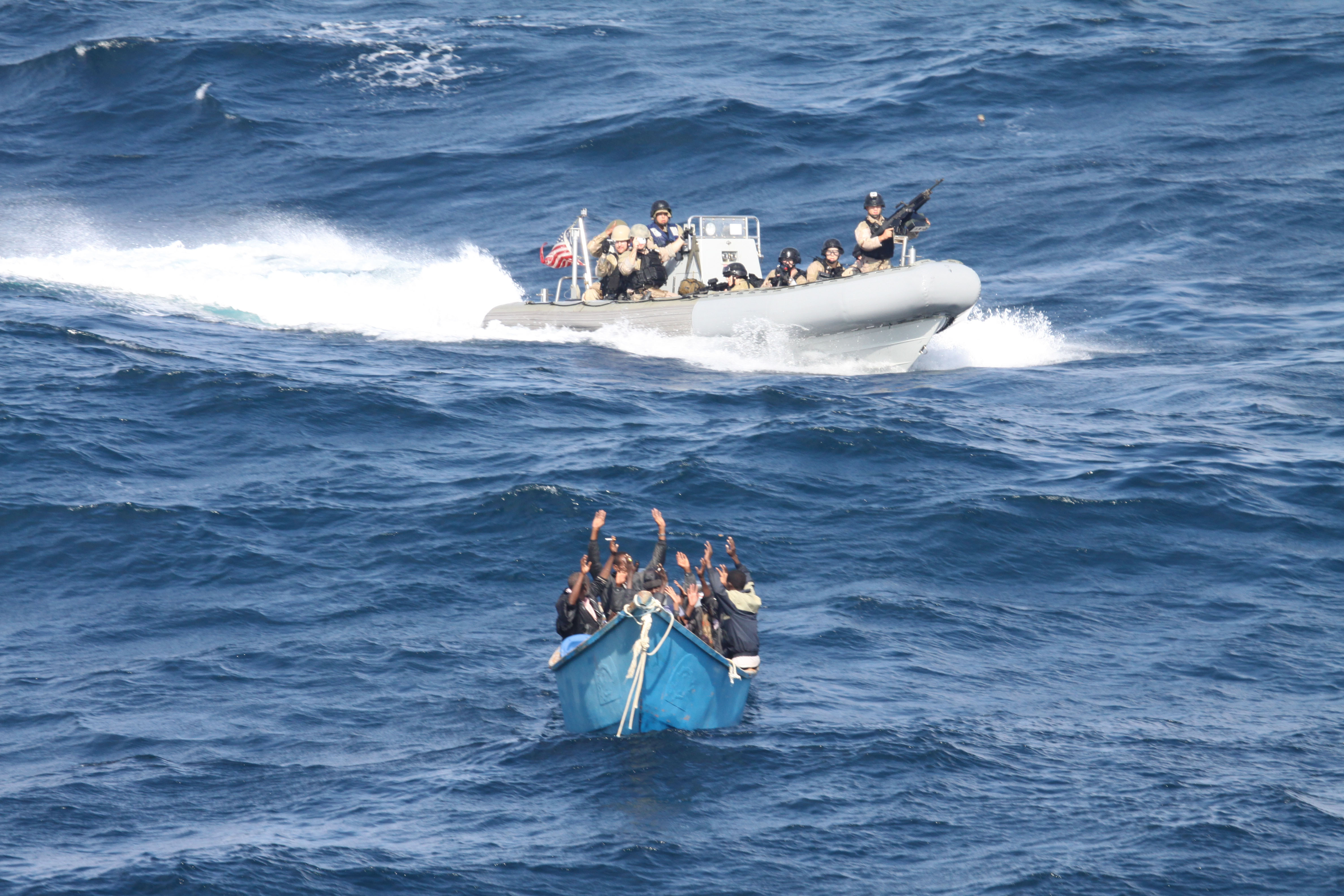
Suspected Somali pirates keep their hands in the air

The Regional Cooperation Agreement on Combating Piracy and Armed Robbery against Ships in Asia was formed in November 2006.

Since the 2010s, the U.S. Navy and others have been developing artificial intelligence (AI)-based systems that generate piracy alerts based on surveillance data.

=== Self-defense ===
The fourth volume of the handbook: Best Management Practices to Deter Piracy off the Coast of Somalia and in the Arabian Sea Area (known as BMP4) is the current authoritative guide for merchant ships on self-defense against pirates. The guide is issued and updated by Oil Companies International Marine Forum (OCIMF), a consortium of interested international shipping and trading organizations including the EU, NATO and the International Maritime Bureau. It is distributed primarily by the Maritime Security Centre – Horn of Africa (MSCHOA), the planning and coordination authority for EU naval forces (EUNAVFOR).

The BMP4 encourages vessels to register their voyages through the region with MSCHOA, as this registration is a key component of the International Recommended Transit Corridor (IRTC), the navy-patrolled route through the Gulf of Aden. The BMP4 contains a chapter entitled "Self-Protective Measures" that lays out steps a merchant vessel can take to make itself less of a target for pirates and better able to repel an attack if one occurs. This list includes rigging the deck of the ship with razor wire, rigging fire-hoses to spray sea-water over the side of the ship to hinder boardings, having a distinctive pirate alarm, hardening the bridge against gunfire, and creating a "citadel" where the crew can retreat if pirates get on board. Other unofficial self-defense measures that can be found on merchant vessels include the setting up of mannequins posing as armed guards or firing flares at the pirates.

Though it varies by country, generally, peacetime law in the 20th and 21st centuries has not allowed merchant vessels to carry weapons. In response to the rise in modern piracy, however, the U.S. government changed its rules, allowing U.S.-flagged vessels to deploy a team of armed private security guards. The US Coast Guard leaves it to the ship owners' discretion whether those guards will be armed. The International Chamber of Shipping (ICS) in 2011 changed its stance on private armed guards, accepting that operators must be able to defend their ships against pirate attacks.

This has given rise to a new breed of private security companies that provide training for crew members and operate floating armouries to protect crew and cargo. This has proved effective in countering pirate attacks. The use of floating armouries in international waters allows ships to carry weapons in international waters, without having arms within coastal waters where they would be illegal. Seychelles has become a central hub for international anti-piracy operations, hosting the Indian Ocean Anti-Piracy Operation Center. In 2008, VSOS became the first authorized armed maritime security company to operate in the Indian Ocean region.

With safety trials complete in the late 2000s, laser dazzlers have been developed for defensive purposes on super-yachts. They can be effective up to 4 kilometres (2.5 mi) with the effects going from mild disorientation to flash blindness at closer range.

In February 2012, Italian Marines based on the tanker Enrica Lexie allegedly fired on an Indian fishing trawler off Kerala, killing two of her eleven crew. The Marines allegedly mistook the fishing vessel for a pirate vessel. The incident sparked a diplomatic row between India and Italy. Enrica Lexie was ordered into Kochi where her crew were questioned by officers of the Indian Police. The fact is still sub juris and its legal eventual outcome could influence future deployment of VPDs, since states will be either encouraged or discouraged to provide them depending on whether functional immunity is ultimately granted or denied to the Italians.

Another similar incident has been reported to have happened in the Red Sea between the coasts of Somalia and Yemen, involving the death of a Yemeni fisherman allegedly at the hands of a Russian Vessel Protection Detachment (VPD) on board a Norwegian-flagged vessel.

Despite VPD deployment being controversial because of these incidents, according to the Associated Press, during a United Nations Security Council conference about piracy "U.S. Ambassador Susan Rice told the council that no ship carrying armed guards has been successfully attacked by pirates" and "French Ambassador Gerard Araud stressed that private guards do not have the deterrent effect that government-posted marine and sailors and naval patrols have in warding off attacks".

=== Self protection measures ===
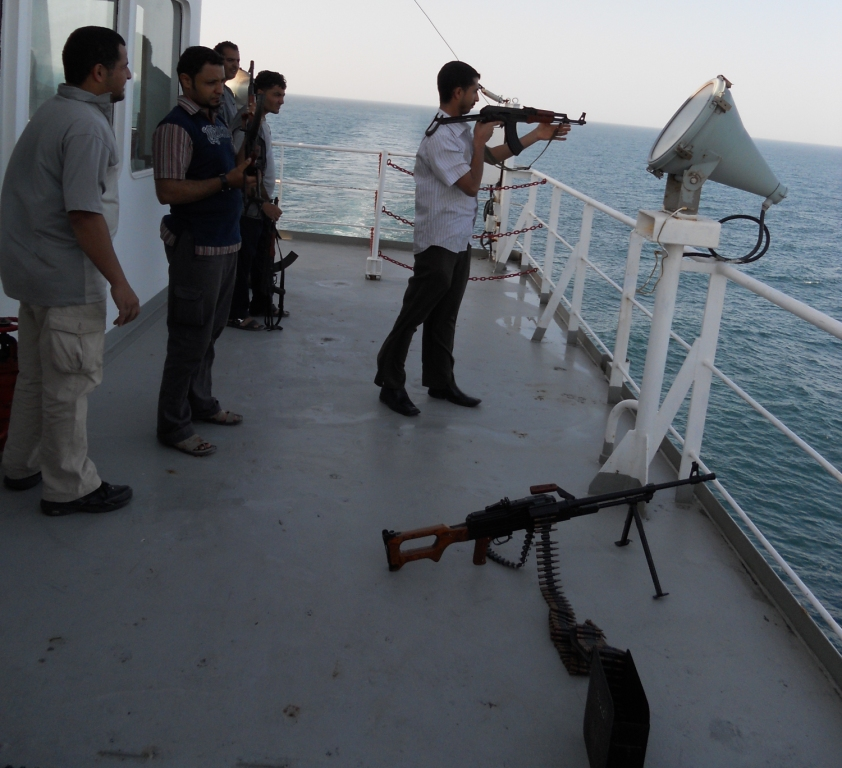
A private guard escort on a merchant ship providing security services against piracy in the Indian Ocean

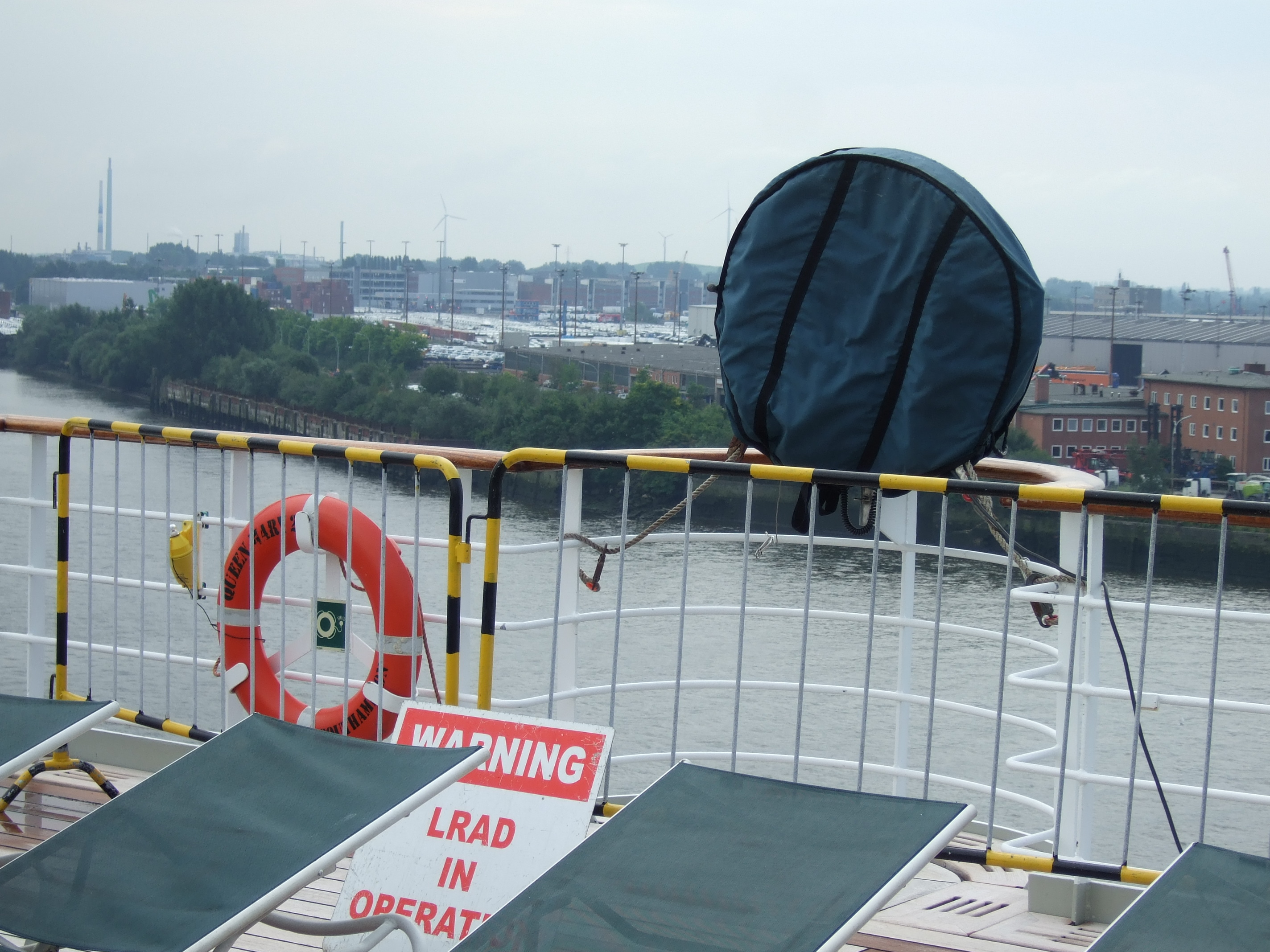
An LRAD sound cannon mounted on RMS Queen Mary 2

The best protection against pirates is to avoid encountering them. This can be accomplished by using tools such as radar, or by using specialised systems that use shorter wavelengths, as small boats are not always picked up by radar. An example of a specialised system is WatchStander.

While the non-wartime 20th-century tradition has been for merchant vessels not to be armed, the U.S. Government has recently changed the rules so that it is now "best practice" for vessels to embark a team of armed private security guards. The guards are usually supplied from ships intended specifically for training and supplying such armed personnel. The crew can be given weapons training, and warning shots can be fired legally in international waters.

Other measures vessels can take to protect themselves against piracy are air-pressurised boat stopping systems which can fire a variety of vessel-disabling projectiles, implementing a high freewall and vessel boarding protection systems (e.g., hot water wall, electricity-charged water wall, automated fire monitor, slippery foam). Ships can also attempt to protect themselves using their Automatic Identification Systems (AIS). Every ship over 300 tons carries a transponder supplying both information about the ship itself and its movements. Any unexpected change in this information can attract attention.

Previously, this data could only be picked up if there was a nearby ship, rendering single ships vulnerable. Specialised satellites have recently been launched to detect and retransmit this data. Large ships cannot, therefore, be hijacked without being detected. This can deter attempts to hijack the entire ship or steal large portions of cargo with another ship, since an escort can be sent more quickly.

=== Patrol ===
In an emergency, warships can be called upon. In some areas, such as near Somalia, patrolling naval vessels from different nations are available to intercept vessels attacking merchant vessels. For patrolling dangerous coastal waters, or keeping costs down, robotic or remote-controlled USVs are also sometimes used. Shore- and vessel-launched UAVs are used by the U.S. Navy. A British former British chief of defence staff (David Richards), questioned the value of expensive kit procured by successive governments, saying "We have £1bn destroyers trying to sort out pirates in a little dhow with RPGs [rocket-propelled grenade launchers] costing US$50, with an outboard motor [costing] $100".

== Legal aspects ==
=== United Kingdom laws ===
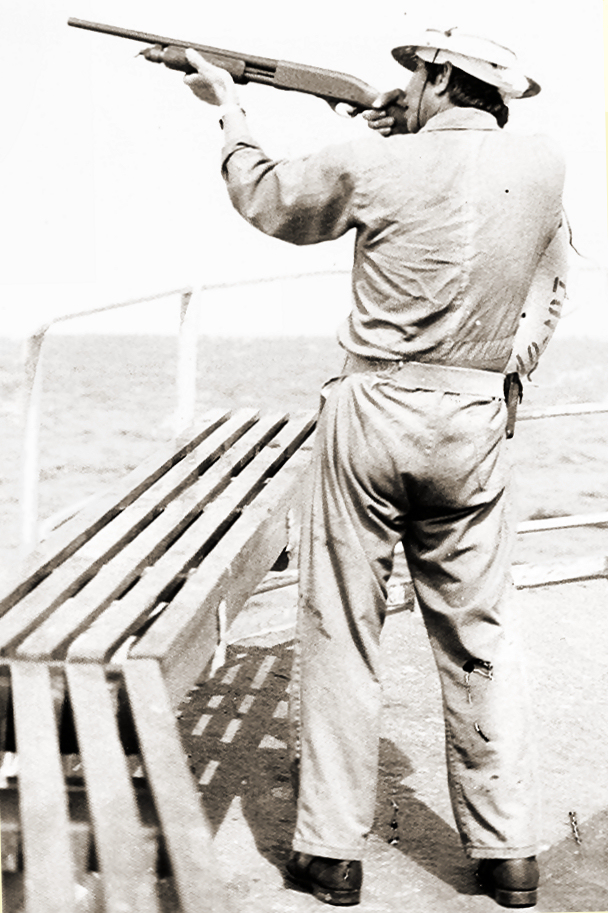
A merchant seaman aboard a fleet oil tanker practices target shooting with a Remington 870 12 gauge shotgun as part of training to repel pirates in the Strait of Malacca, 1984

Section 2 of the Piracy Act 1837 creates a statutory offence of aggravated piracy. See also the Piracy Act 1850.

In 2008, the British Foreign Office advised the Royal Navy not to detain pirates of certain nationalities as they might be able to claim asylum in Britain under British human rights legislation, if their national laws included execution, or mutilation as a judicial punishment for crimes committed as pirates.

==== Definition of piracy jure gentium ====
See section 26 of, and Schedule 5 to, the Merchant Shipping and Maritime Security Act 1997. These provisions replace the Schedule to the Tokyo Convention Act 1967. In Cameron v HM Advocate, 1971 SLT 333, the High Court of Justiciary said that the Schedule supplemented the existing law and did not seek to restrict the scope of the offence of piracy jure gentium.

See also:

- Re Piracy Jure Gentium [1934] AC 586, PC
- Attorney General of Hong Kong v Kwok-a-Sing (1873) LR 5 PC 179

==== Jurisdiction ====
See section 46(2) of the Senior Courts Act 1981 and section 6 of the Territorial Waters Jurisdiction Act 1878. See also R v Kohn (1864) 4 F & F 68.

==== Piracy committed by or against aircraft ====
See section 5 of the Aviation Security Act 1982.

==== Sentence ====
The book Archbold says that in a case that does not fall within section 2 of the Piracy Act 1837, the penalty appears to be determined by the Offences at Sea Act 1799, which provides that offences committed at sea are liable to the same penalty as if they had been committed upon the shore.

==== History ====
William Hawkins said that under common law, piracy by a subject was esteemed to be petty treason. The Treason Act 1351 provided that this was not petty treason.

In English admiralty law, piracy was classified as petty treason during the medieval period, and offenders were accordingly liable to be hanged, drawn and quartered on conviction. Piracy was redefined as a felony during the reign of Henry VIII. In either case, piracy cases were cognizable in the courts of the Lord High Admiral. English judges in admiralty courts and vice admiralty courts emphasized that "neither Faith nor Oath is to be kept" with pirates; i.e., contracts with pirates and oaths sworn to them were not legally binding. Pirates were legally subject to summary execution by their captors if captured in battle. In practice, instances of summary justice and annulment of oaths and contracts involving pirates do not appear to have been common.

=== United States laws ===
In the United States, criminal prosecution of piracy is authorized in the U.S. Constitution, Art. I Sec. 8 cl. 10:

To define and punish Piracies and Felonies committed on the high Seas, and Offences against the Law of Nations;

The Founding Fathers were at loggerheads over piracy. and the Marshall Court (1801-1835) dealt with many cases of piracy. In 1820 the penalty for piracy was death. By 1909, the penalty was life imprisonment. Title 18 U.S.C. § 1651 now states:

Whoever, on the high seas, commits the crime of piracy as defined by the law of nations, and is afterwards brought into or found in the United States, shall be imprisoned for life.

Citing the United States Supreme Court decision in the 1820 case of United States v. Smith (1820), a U.S. District Court ruled in 2010 in the case of United States v. Said that the definition of piracy under section 1651 is confined to "robbery at sea". The piracy charges (but not other serious federal charges) against the defendants in the Said case were dismissed by the Court.

The U.S. District Court for the E.D.Va. has since been overturned: "On May 23, 2012, the United States Court of Appeals for the Fourth Circuit issued an opinion vacating the Court's dismissal of the piracy count. United States v. Said, 680 F.3d 374 (4th Cir.2012). See also United States v. Dire, 680 F.3d 446, 465 (4th Cir.2012) (upholding an instruction to the jury that the crime of piracy includes 'any of the three following actions: (A) any illegal acts of violence or detention or any act of depredation committed for private ends on the high seas or a place outside the jurisdiction of any state by the crew or the passengers of a private ship and directed against another ship or against persons or property on board such ship; or (B) any act of voluntary participation in the operation of a ship with knowledge of facts making it a pirate ship; or (C) any act of inciting or of intentionally facilitating an act described in (A) or (B) above").'" The case was remanded to E.D. Va., see US v. Said, 3 F. Supp. 3d 515 – Dist. Court, ED Virginia (2014).

=== International law ===
==== Effects on international boundaries ====
During the 18th century, the British and the Dutch controlled opposite sides of the Strait of Malacca. The British and the Dutch drew a line separating the Strait into two halves. The agreement was that each party would be responsible for combating piracy in their respective half. Eventually, this line became the border between Malaysia and Indonesia in the Straits.

==== Law of nations ====
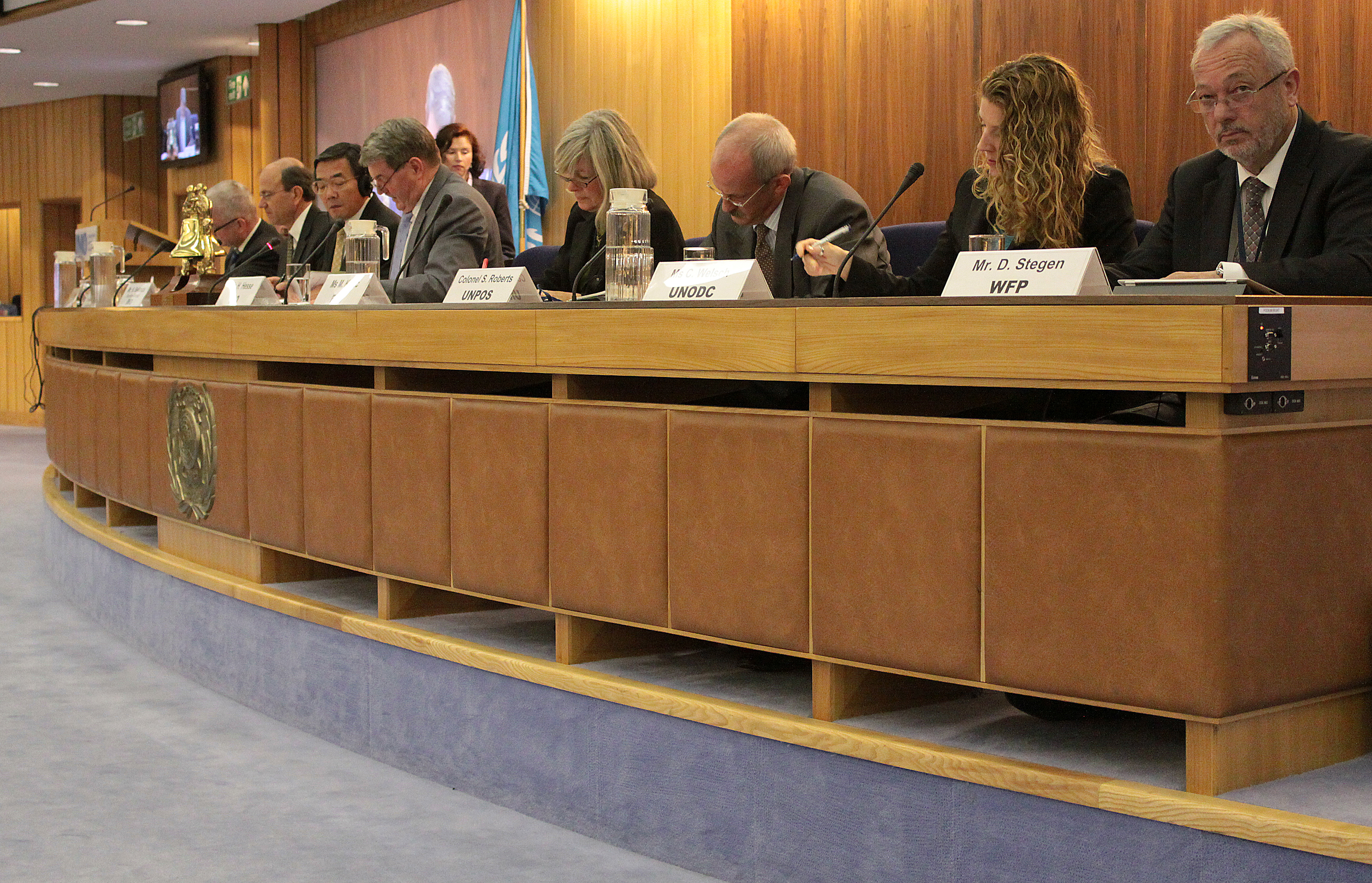
International Maritime Organization (IMO) conference on capacity-building to counter piracy in the Indian Ocean

Piracy is of note in international law because it is widely regarded as the earliest invocation of the concept of universal jurisdiction. The crime of piracy is considered a breach of jus cogens, a conventional peremptory international norm that states must uphold. Those committing thefts on the high seas, inhibiting trade, and endangering maritime communication are considered by sovereign states to hold the status of hostis humani generis (an enemy of humankind).

Because of universal jurisdiction, action can be taken against pirates without objection from the flag state of the pirate vessel. This represents an exception to the principle extra territorium jus dicenti impune non paretur ("One who exercises jurisdiction out of his territory is disobeyed with impunity").

A Convention on Piracy was adopted by the League of Nations in 1932. To this day, the Harvard Draft adds to the debate of what constitutes piracy.

==== International conventions ====
===== Articles 101 to 103 of UNCLOS =====
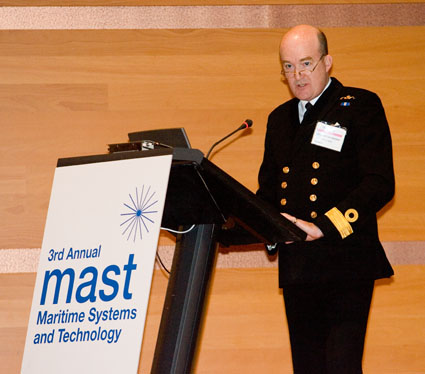
British Royal Navy Commodore gives a presentation on piracy at the MAST 2008 conference

Articles 101 to 103 of the United Nations Convention on the Law of the Sea (UNCLOS) (1982) contain a definition of piracy iure gentium (i.e., according to international law). They read:

Article 101

Definition of piracy

Piracy consists of any of the following acts:

- (a) any illegal acts of violence or detention, or any act of depredation, committed for private ends by the crew or the passengers of a private ship or a private aircraft, and directed—
  - (i) on the high seas, against another ship or aircraft, or against persons or property on board such ship or aircraft;
  - (ii) against a ship, aircraft, persons, or property in a place outside the jurisdiction of any State;
- (b) any act of voluntary participation in the operation of a ship or of an aircraft with knowledge of facts making it a pirate ship or aircraft;
- (c) any act of inciting or of intentionally facilitating an act described in subparagraph (a) or (b).

Article 102

Piracy by a warship, government ship, or government aircraft whose crew has mutinied.

The acts of piracy, as defined in article 101, committed by a warship, government ship, or government aircraft whose crew has mutinied and taken control of the ship or aircraft are assimilated to acts committed by a private ship or aircraft.

Article 103

Definition of a pirate ship or aircraft

A ship or aircraft is considered a pirate ship or aircraft if it is intended by the persons in dominant control to be used for the purpose of committing one of the acts referred to in article 101. The same applies if the ship or aircraft has been used to commit any such act, so long as it remains under the control of the persons guilty of that act.

This definition was formerly contained in articles 15 to 17 of the Convention on the High Seas signed at Geneva on April 29, 1958. It was drafted by the International Law Commission.

A limitation of Article 101 above is that it confines piracy to the High Seas. As most piratical acts occur within territorial waters, some pirates go free because certain jurisdictions lack the resources to monitor their borders adequately.

==== IMB definition ====
The International Maritime Bureau (IMB) defines piracy as:

the act of boarding any vessel with an intent to commit theft or any other crime, and with an intent or capacity to use force in furtherance of that act.

==== Uniformity in maritime piracy law ====
Given the divergent definitions of piracy in international and municipal legal systems, some authors argue that greater uniformity in the law is required to strengthen anti-piracy legal instruments.

== Cultural perceptions ==
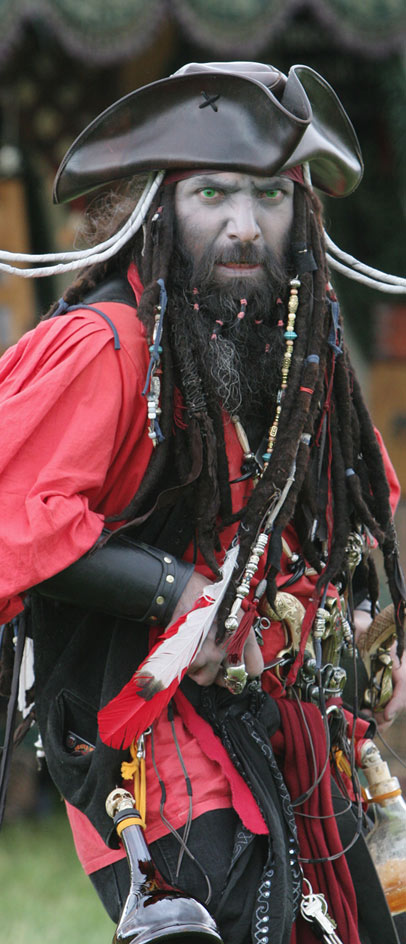
"Mic the Scallywag" of the Pirates of Emerson Haunted Adventure, Fremont, California

Pirates are a frequent topic in fiction and, in their Caribbean incarnation, are associated with certain stereotypical manners of speaking and dress, some of them wholly fictional: "nearly all our notions of their behavior come from the golden age of fictional piracy, which reached its zenith in 1881 with the appearance of Robert Louis Stevenson's Treasure Island." Hugely influential in shaping the popular conception of pirates, Captain Charles Johnson's A General History of the Pyrates, published in London in 1724, is the prime source for the biographies of many well known pirates of the Golden Age. The book gives an almost mythical status to pirates, with naval historian David Cordingly writing: "it has been said, and there seems no reason to question this, that Captain Johnson created the modern conception of pirates."

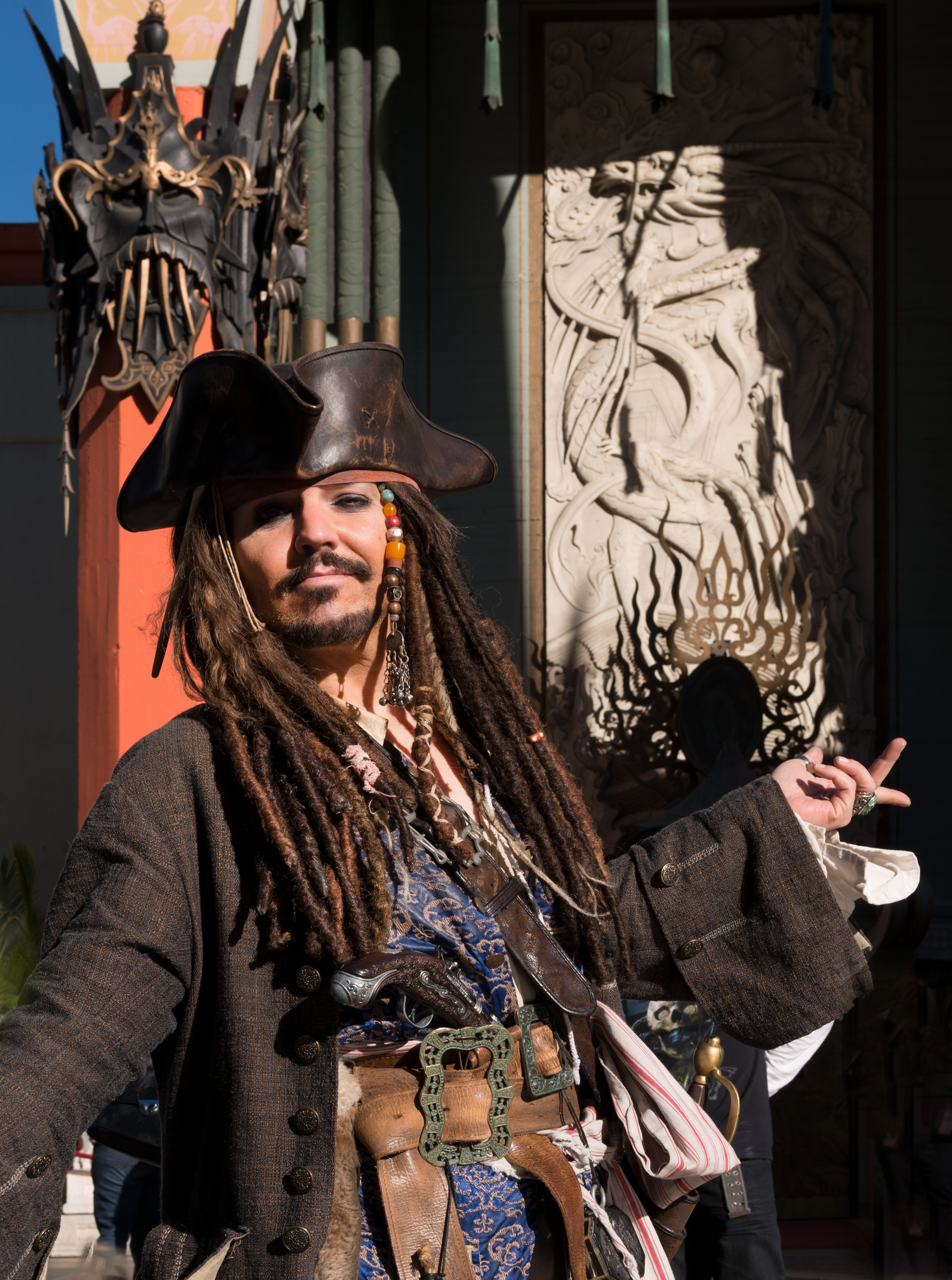
A person costumed in the character of captain Jack Sparrow, Johnny Depp's lead role in the Pirates of the Caribbean film series

In the 1830s, Letitia Elizabeth Landon received material relating to piracy for an annual for which she was responsible; she produced two Pirate Songs, the first in 1831, "The Pirate's Song off Tiger Island" and the second, "Bona, the Pirate's Song" in 1837. This last was reproduced many times as "The Pirate's Song", often uncredited. Bona is now the city of Annaba in Algeria.

Some inventions of pirate culture, such as "walking the plank"—in which a bound captive is forced to walk off a board extending over the sea—were popularized by J. M. Barrie's 1911 novel, Peter Pan, where the fictional pirate Captain Hook and his crew helped define the fictional pirate archetype. English actor Robert Newton's portrayal of Long John Silver in Disney's 1950 film adaptation also helped define the modern rendition of a pirate, including the stereotypical West Country "pirate accent". Other influences include Sinbad the Sailor, and the Pirates of the Caribbean films have helped rekindle modern interest in piracy and have performed well at the box office. The video game Assassin's Creed IV: Black Flag revolves around pirates during the Golden Age of Piracy.

The classic 1879 Gilbert and Sullivan comic opera The Pirates of Penzance focuses on The Pirate King and his hapless band of pirates.

Many sports teams use "pirate" or a related term, such as "raider" or "buccaneer", as their nickname, based on the popular stereotypes of pirates. The earliest such example was probably the Pittsburgh Pirates of Major League Baseball that acquired their nickname in 1891 after allegedly "pirating" a player from another team. Many amateur and school-based sports programs along with several professional sports franchises have also adopted pirate-related names, including the Las Vegas Raiders and Tampa Bay Buccaneers of the National Football League. In turn, the Buccaneer's name was inspired by the Gasparilla Pirate Festival, a large community parade and related events in Tampa, Florida centered around the legend of José Gaspar, a mythical pirate who supposedly operated in the area.

== Economics of piracy ==
Sources on the economics of piracy include Cyrus Karraker's 1953 study Piracy was a Business, in which the author discusses pirates in terms of contemporary racketeering. Patrick Crowhurst researched French piracy, and David Starkey focused on British 18th-century piracy. Note also the 1998 book The Invisible Hook: The Hidden Economics of Pirates by Peter T. Leeson.

=== Piracy and entrepreneurship ===
Some 2014 research examines the links between piracy and entrepreneurship. In this context, researchers take a nonmoral approach to piracy as a source of inspiration for 2010s-era entrepreneurship education and to research in entrepreneurship and in business-model generation.

In this respect, analysis of piracy operations may distinguish between planned (organised) and opportunistic piracy.

== See also ==
- A General History of the Pyrates, an historical book on pirates
- Air pirate
- Aircraft hijacking, a.k.a. air piracy
- Carjacking a.k.a. car piracy
- Copyright infringement
- International Talk Like a Pirate Day
- List of pirates
- Piracy in the Atlantic World
- Piracy kidnappings
- Pirate code
- Pirate game
- Pirate Party
- Pirate Round
- Pirate studies
- Pirate utopia
- Pirates World
- Republic of Pirates
- Raid (military)
- Space pirate
- The Successful Pyrate, an historical play
- Train robbery, a.k.a. railroad piracy
- Women in piracy
- Violent non-state actors at sea
- Private maritime security companies
