= Piracy Act =

Stock short title used for UK legislation

Piracy Act is a stock short title used for legislation in the United Kingdom relating to piracy.

The bill for an act with this short title may have been known as a Piracy Bill during its passage through Parliament.

== List ==
- The Piracy Act 1670 (22 & 23 Cha. 2. c. 11)
- The Piracy Act 1698 (11 Will. 3. c. 7)
- The Piracy Act 1717 (4 Geo. 1. c. 11)
- The Piracy Act 1721 (8 Geo. 1. c. 24)
- The Piracy Act 1744 (18 Geo. 2. c. 30)
- The Piratical Ships Act 1825 (6 Geo. 4. c. 49)
- The Piracy Act 1837 (7 Will. 4 & 1 Vict. c. 88)
- The Piracy Act 1850 (13 & 14 Vict. c. 26)

== See also ==
- Acts of grace (piracy)
- List of short titles
- Offences at Sea Act 1536
