= Piracy Act 1698 =

Act of the Parliament of England

Piracy Act 1698 (Note: The citation of this act by this short title was authorised by section 5 of, and the second schedule to, the Statute Law Revision Act 1948. Due to the repeal of those provisions, it is now authorised by section 19(2) of the Interpretation Act 1978.)
- Act of Parliament
- Parliament of England
- Long title: An Act for the more effectual Suppression of Piracy. (Note: These words are printed against this act in the second column of the second schedule to the Statute Law Revision Act 1948, which is headed "Title".)
- Citation: 11 Will. 3 c. 7 (Note: This is the citation in The Statutes of the Realm.); 11 & 12 Will. 3. c. 7 (Note: This is the citation in The Statutes at Large.)
- Territorial extent: England and Wales

Dates
- Royal assent: 11 April 1700
- Commencement: 16 November 1699 (Note: Start of session.)
- Repealed: 5 November 1993

Other legislation
- Amends: Offences at Sea Act 1536
- Amended by: Continuance of Laws Act 1706; Perpetuation, etc. of Acts 1719; Piracy Act 1744; Piracy Act 1837; Statute Law Revision Act 1867; Statute Law Revision Act 1888; British Nationality Act 1948; Criminal Law Act 1967
- Repealed by: Statute Law (Repeals) Act 1993
- Relates to: Offences at Sea Act; Offences at Sea Act 1536; Offences Against the Person Act 1828; Criminal Law (India) Act 1828

Status: Repealed

Text of statute as originally enacted

Revised text of statute as amended

The Piracy Act 1698 (11 Will. 3. c. 7) was an act of the Parliament of England passed in the eleventh year of King William III. The main purpose behind the statute was to make some corrections to the Offences at Sea Act 1536 (28 Hen. 8. c. 15).

== Provisions ==
The act states that "it hath been found by experience" that the courts met with "great trouble and charges in sending them [pirates] into England" to be tried for their crimes or cannot easily "be questioned for such their piracies and robberies" because this was the necessary measure for enforcing the law under the Offences at Sea Act 1536 (28 Hen. 8. c. 15) of Henry VIII. The act changed this law to allow for acts of piracy to be "examined, inquired of, tried, heard and determined, and adjudged in any place at sea, or upon the land, in any of his Majesty's islands, plantations, colonies, dominions, forts, or factories". This enabled admirals to hold a court session to hear the trials of pirates in any place they deemed necessary, rather than requiring that the trial be held in England.

The act then proceeds to explain what is required for these admiralty court sessions to function, how they will run, and what powers it grants to the commissioners. The commissioners can "call and assemble a court of admiralty when and as often as occasion shall require". In addition, these courts shall consist of at least seven people who "are known merchants, factors, or planters, or such as are captains, lieutenants, or warrant officers" and who are "fitting and voting in the said court". The act also grants the commissioners of these vice-admiralty courts with "full power and authority" to issue warrants, summon the necessary witnesses, and "to do all thing necessary for the hearing and final determination of any case of piracy, robbery, or felony". The act then moves to instruct the commissioners on the proceedings of the courts in a significant amount of detail ranging from the oath that the president of the court must take, what actions were to be taken upon pleas of guilty or not guilty, and how to examine witnesses and give sentence.

In addition, the act adds additional instances, not listed in the original Offences at Sea Act 1536, which expanded the legal definition of piracy as a capital crime. The first of these includes any subject of the crown who commits any act of piracy "under colour of any commission from any foreign prince or state". Additionally, any commander who "piratically and feloniously run away with his or their ships", anyone who may "consult, combine, or confederate" with any pirates, or "shall lay violent hands upon his commander whereby to hinder him from fighting" pirates who may be attempting to capture their vessel.

The act also added the offence of being an accessory to piracy. Under the act, any individual who may "knowingly or willingly ... aid and assist, or maintain, procure, command, counsel, or advise" and persons to commit any act of piracy "shall be deemed and adjudged to be accessory to such piracy". This title of accessory was also extended to any persons who "receive, entertain, or conceal any such pirate or robber". These accessories "shall be enquired of, tried, heard, determined, and adjudged" following the original Offences at Sea Act 1536 and "shall suffer such pains of death" just as the pirates themselves would.

== Subsequent developments ==
The majority of the cases tried under these admiralty courts followed the exact proceedings laid out in the act. In addition, most pirates appeared to have been given a fair trial because, if the accused could not be confirmed to have taken part in the said piracy by witness testimony, they were often acquitted. However, in the High Court of Admiralty, murder was almost always considered the more serious charge. In fact, during a 1737 case in which Edward Johnson and Nicholas Williams were being tried, the counsel proceeded with the murder charge after stating: *I will not touch upon the Piracy, that will come under your consideration hereafter." This shows that the counsel prosecuted the accused for piracy only after the trial for murder was finished.

== Subsequent developments ==
The act was continued until the end of the next session of parliament after 7 years from the expiration of the act by section 4 of the Continuance of Laws Act 1706 (6 Ann. c. 34) (Note: This is the citation in The Statutes of the Realm.)

The act was made perpetual by section 3 of the Perpetuation, etc. of Acts 1719 (6 Geo. 1. c. 19).

The death penalty under this act was abolished by the Piracy Act 1837 (7 Will. 4 & 1 Vict. c. 88).

Sections 1–6, 13 and 15 of the act were repealed by section 1 of, and the schedule to, the Statute Law Revision Act 1867 (30 & 31 Vict. c. 59), which came into force on 15 July 1867.

Sections 9 and 10 of the act were repealed by section 10(2) of, and part III of schedule 3 to, the Criminal Law Act 1967, which came into force on 1 January 1968.

The whole act was repealed by section 1(1) of, and group 2 of part I of schedule 1 to, the Statute Law (Repeals) Act 1993, which came into force on 5 November 1993.

The whole act was repealed for the Australian Capital Territory by section 6(1) of, and Part 4.11 of Schedule 4 to, the Statute Law Amendment Act 2002 (No. 2).

== See also ==
- Piracy Act
