= Piratical Ships Act 1825 =

Act of the Parliament of the United Kingdom

- Act of Parliament
- Parliament of the United Kingdom
- Long title: An Act for encouraging the Capture or Destruction of piratical Ships and Vessels.
- Citation: 6 Geo. 4. c. 49
- Territorial extent: United Kingdom

Dates
- Royal assent: 22 June 1825
- Commencement: 22 June 1825 (Note: The Acts of Parliament (Commencement) Act 1793.)
- Repealed: 1 June 1850 (Note: The Pirates (Head Money) Repeal Act Commencement Act 1850 (13 & 14 Vict. c. 27).)
Other legislation
Repealed by	Piracy Act 1850

Status: Repealed

Text of statute as originally enacted

The Piratical Ships Act 1825 (6 Geo. 4. c. 49) was an act of the Parliament of the United Kingdom. One of the anti-Piracy Acts, it also is known as An Act for encouraging the Capture or Destruction of Piratical Ships and Vessels, as well as the Bounty Act and the Pirates (Head Money) Act. It put a price on the heads of pirates.

== Subsequent developments ==
The act was amended by the Piracy Act 1837 (7 Will. 4 & 1 Vict. c. 88), which abolished the death penalty for most offences of piracy, but created a new offence often known as piracy with violence, which was punishable with death. This offence still exists in the United Kingdom, but is no longer punishable by death since the Crime and Disorder Act 1998.

The whole act was repealed by section 1 of the Piracy Act 1850 (13 & 14 Vict. c. 26), which came into force on 1 June 1850.
