= Sunday Observance Act 1780 =

Act of the Parliament of Great Britain

Sunday Observance Act 1780 (Note: The citation of this act by this short title was authorised by section 1 of, and the first schedule to, the Short Titles Act 1896. Due to the repeal of those provisions it is now authorised by section 19(2) of the Interpretation Act 1978.) (Note: Some sources may refer to the Act as the Sunday Observance Act 1781, this being the year in which it was passed.)
- Act of Parliament
- Parliament of Great Britain
- Long title: An Act for preventing certain Abuses and Profanations on the Lord's Day called Sunday.
- Citation: 21 Geo. 3. c. 49
- Territorial extent: Great Britain

Dates
- Royal assent: 19 June 1781
- Commencement: 19 June 1781 (Note: Section 1.)
- Repealed: 24 November 2005 (Note: The Licensing Act 2003 (Commencement No. 7 and Transitional Provisions) Order 2005 (SI 2005/3056).)
Other legislation
Amended by	Limitation of Actions and Costs Act 1842; Fairs and Markets Act 1850; Statute Law Revision Act 1888; Public Authorities Protection Act 1893; Sunday Entertainments Act 1932; Ecclesiastical Jurisdiction Measure 1963; Statute Law Revision Act 1966
Repealed by	Licensing Act 2003
Relates to	Common Informers Act 1951; Licensing Act 1964; Sunday Theatre Act 1972; Cinemas Act 1985; Deregulation and Contracting Out Act 1994; Deregulation (Sunday Dancing) Order 2000

Status: Repealed

Text of statute as originally enacted

Revised text of statute as amended

The Sunday Observance Act 1780 (21 Geo. 3. c. 49) was an act of the Parliament of Great Britain.

Originally eight sections long, only sections 1 to 3 were still in force after the 1960s. These sections prohibited the use of any building or room for public entertainment or debate on a Sunday.

During November 1865, the National Sunday League (NSL) held a series of lectures for the general public entitled "Sunday Evenings for the People". This was fiercely opposed by the Lord's Day Observance Society (LDOS), who had the lectures cancelled after only four had been given. This was done by threatening the management of St Martin's Hall with legal action as lectures were forbidden under the act.

In 1931, Millie Orpen, a solicitor's clerk, brought an action as a common informer against a cinema chain for opening on a succession of Sundays, contrary to the Sunday Observance Act 1780, s.1. Orpen claimed £25,000 against the cinema company and individual members of its board of directors. The claim was based on a forfeit of £200 per performance per defendant. The judge, Mr Justice Rowlatt, expressed some distaste for the proceedings. He found against the cinema chain, awarding Orpen £5,000, with costs, but found for the individual directors on the grounds that there was no evidence that they were guilty on any particular Sunday. Costs were awarded to the directors against Orpen. The judge granted a stay pending an appeal by the company. Later in the year, Orpen brought a claim against another chain, but was thwarted by a change in the law legalising Sunday opening for cinemas before her case could be decided.

== Other legislation ==
The act was affected by sections 1(1) and (3) of the Common Informers Act 1951 (14 & 15 Geo. 6. c. 39). Its provisions were tightened by the Fairs and Markets Act 1850 (13 & 14 Vict. c. 23).

Its provisions were excluded in relation to certain activities by:

- the Sunday Entertainments Act 1932 (22 & 23 Geo. 5. c. 51), which amended section 4, and allowed a local authority to grant a licence for cinematographic performances on Sundays "subject to such conditions as the authority think fit to impose". The provision on cinematographic licences and the discretion exercised by Wednesbury Corporation in relation to the Gaumont Cinema in Wednesbury gave rise to a judicial requirement that the exercise of such discretion by a public authority must not be "unreasonable".
- section 9 of the Cinemas Act 1985
- section 1 of the Sunday Theatre Act 1972
- section 21 of the Deregulation and Contracting Out Act 1994
- article 2 of the Deregulation (Sunday Dancing) Order 2000 (S.I. 2000/3372), and
- section 88 of the Licensing Act 1964.

== Case law ==
The following cases were decided in relation to the act:

- Baxter v. Langley (1868) LR 4 CP 21, 38 LJMC 1
- Terry v. Brighton Aquarium Co (1875) LR 10 QB 306, 39 JP 519
- Reid v. Wilson and Ward [1895] 1 QB 315, [1891 - 1894] All ER Rep 500
- Williams v. Wright (1897) 13 TLR 551
- Orpen v. Haymarket Capitol Ltd (1931) 145 LT 614, [1931] All ER 360
- Orpen v. New Empire Ltd (1931) 48 TLR 8, 75 Sol Jo 763
- R v. London County Council, ex parte Entertainments Protection Association Ltd [1931] 2 KB 215, 100 LJKB 760
- Green v. Kursal (Southend on Sea) Estates Ltd [1937] 1 All ER, 81 Sol Jo 279
- Houghten Le Touzel v. Mecca Ltd [1950] 2 KB 612, [1950] 1 All ER 638
- Culley v. Harrison [1956] 2 QB 71, [1956] 2 All ER 254

== Subsequent developments ==
Section 6 was repealed in part by section 2 of the Limitation of Actions and Costs Act 1842 (5 & 6 Vict. c. 97) and entirely by section 2 of the Public Authorities Protection Act 1893 (56 & 57 Vict. c. 61).

Section 7 of the act was repealed by section 87 of, and the fifth schedule to, the Ecclesiastical Jurisdiction Measure 1963 (No. 1), which came into force on 1 March 1965.

Sections 4, 5 and 8 of the act were repealed by section 1 of, and the schedule to, the Statute Law Revision Act 1966, which came into force on 10 March 1966.

Sections 1 to 3 were repealed by sections 198(1) and 199 of, and paragraph 3 of schedule 6 and schedule 7 to, the Licensing Act 2003 (with effect from 24 November 2005).

== See also ==
- Sunday Observance Act for similar acts in Britain and Ireland in 1625, 1627, 1677, and 1695.
