= Piracy Act 1850 =

Act of the Parliament of the United Kingdom

Piracy Act 1850 (Note: The citation of this act by this short title was authorised by section 1 of, and the first schedule to, the Short Titles Act 1896. Due to the repeal of those provisions it is now authorised by section 19(2) of the Interpretation Act 1978.)
- Act of Parliament
- Parliament of the United Kingdom
- Long title: An Act to repeal an Act of the Sixth Year of King George the Fourth, for encouraging the Capture or Destruction of Piratical Ships and Vessels; and to make other Provisions in lieu thereof.
- Citation: 13 & 14 Vict. c. 26
- Territorial extent: United Kingdom

Dates
- Royal assent: 25 June 1850
- Commencement: 1 June 1850 (Note: Section 1 provided that the act would come into force on 1 June 1851. This was amended by the Pirates (Head Money) Repeal Act Commencement Act 1850 (13 & 14 Vict. c. 27).)
Other legislation
Repeals/revokes	Piratical Ships Act 1825
Amended by	Statute Law Revision Act 1875; Statute Law Revision Act 1891; Statute Law Revision Act 1963; Courts Act 1971

Status: Partially repealed

Text of statute as originally enacted

Revised text of statute as amended

Text of the Piracy Act 1850 as in force today (including any amendments) within the United Kingdom, from legislation.gov.uk.

The Piracy Act 1850 (13 & 14 Vict. c. 26), sometimes called the Pirates (Head Money) Repeal Act 1850, is an act of the Parliament of the United Kingdom. It relates to proceedings for the condemnation of ships and other things taken from pirates and creates an offence of perjury in such proceedings.

The act is retained for Ireland by section 2 of, and part 4 of schedule 1 to, the Statute Law Revision Act 2007. The act was repealed so far as it was part of the law of the Commonwealth or a territory of Australia by section 53 of, and schedule 2 to, the Crimes Legislation Amendment Act 1992.

The case of The Magellan Pirates was decided under this Act.

The cost of rewards paid under the act have been given in the Navy Estimates.

== Provisions ==
=== Section 1 ===
Section 1 repealed the Piratical Ships Act 1825 (6 Geo. 4. c. 49) ("An Act for encouraging the Capture or Destruction of Piratical Ships and Vessels").

In section 2, the words "or any of the Ships or Vessels of War of the East India Company" and "after the said First Day of June" and from "including" to "Company" were repealed by the Statute Law Revision Act 1875 (38 & 39 Vict. c. 66). In section 3, the words "said Lord Commissioners of the", occurring twice, were repealed by the Statute Law Revision Act 1891.

Sections 2 and 3 were repealed for New Zealand by section 14(1) of, and the schedule to, the Admiralty Act 1973 (No 119).

=== Section 5 - Condemnation of ships etc taken from pirates ===
...all ships, vessels, boats, goods, merchandise, specie, or other property taken possession of from pirates by any of her Majesty's ships or vessels of war or hired armed vessels,... or their boats, or any of the officers or crews thereof, shall and may be proceeded against in any of the admiralty courts before mentioned, and be subject and liable to condemnation as droits and perquisites of her Majesty in her Office of Admiralty: Provided always, that if any part of the said property shall be duly proved to have belonged to and to have been taken from any of her Majesty's subjects, or from the subjects of any foreign power, then such property and every part thereof shall, by the decree of the said court, be adjudged to be restored, and shall be accordingly restored, to the former owner or owners, proprietor or proprietors thereof respectively, he or they paying for in lieu of salvage a sum of money equal to one eighth part of the true value, which money... shall be paid to and divided and distributed amongst the officers and crews thereof, in such manner, form, and proportion as other bounties are now distributable by virtue of her Majesty's proclamation or order in council dated the thirteenth day of July one thousand eight hundred and forty-nine, or as her Majesty,... shall from time to time by any further proclamation or order or orders in council think fit to declare and direct....

The words omitted were repealed by the Statute Law Revision Act 1875 (38 & 39 Vict. c. 66) and the Statute Law Revision Act 1891.

"The admiralty courts before mentioned"

Section 2 mentioned the High Court of Admiralty of England and all courts of vice admiralty in any dominions of Her Majesty beyond the seas.

The jurisdiction of the High Court of Admiralty of England was transferred to the High Court by section 1(1) of the Administration of Justice Act 1956. The jurisdiction of the Courts of Vice-Admiralty in Her Majesty's possessions abroad was transferred to Colonial Courts of Admiralty by sections 2(3) and 17 of the Colonial Courts of Admiralty Act 1890.

=== Section 6 - Perjury ===
In England and Wales this section provides:

. . . every person who shall wilfully and corruptly give false evidence in any examination or deposition had or affidavit taken in any proceeding under this Act shall be deemed guilty of perjury, and being thereof convicted shall be subject and liable to all the punishments, pains, and penalties to which persons convicted of wilful and corrupt perjury are liable; and every such person may be tried for any such perjury either in the place where the offence was committed or in any colony or settlement of her Majesty near thereto in which there is a court of competent jurisdiction to try any such offence, or... in England;....

The words at the start were repealed by the Statute Law Revision Act 1891. The words in the second place and at the end were repealed by section 56(4) of, and Part IV of Schedule 11 to, the Courts Act 1971.

This section was repealed for Northern Ireland by the Perjury Act (Northern Ireland) 1946. This section was repealed for New Zealand by section 412(1) of, and the Fourth Schedule to, the Crimes Act 1961.

"All the punishments, pains, and penalties to which persons convicted of wilful and corrupt perjury are liable"

The penalty for perjury is now provided by section 1 of the Perjury Act 1911.

"England"

This expression includes Wales.

== Commencement ==
Pirates (Head Money) Repeal Act Commencement Act 1850
- Act of Parliament
- Parliament of the United Kingdom
- Long title: An Act to provide for the Commencement of an Act of the present Session, intituled An Act to repeal an Act of the Sixth Year of King George the Fourth, for encouraging the Capture or Destruction of Piratical Ships and Vessels, and to make other Provisions in lieu thereof.
- Citation: 13 & 14 Vict. c. 27
- Territorial extent: United Kingdom

Dates
- Royal assent: 15 July 1850
- Commencement: 15 July 1850 (Note: The Acts of Parliament (Commencement) Act 1793.)
- Repealed: 11 August 1875
Other legislation
Amends	Piracy Act 1850
Repealed by	Statute Law Revision Act 1875

Status: Repealed

Text of statute as originally enacted

The Pirates (Head Money) Repeal Act Commencement Act 1850 13 & 14 Vict. c. 27 (1850) was an act of the Parliament of the United Kingdom. The bill for the act was called the Pirates (Head Money) Repeal Act Commencement Bill. The act provided that the Piracy Act 1850 was to come into force on 1 June 1850 instead of 1 June 1851. The whole act was repealed by section 1 of, and the schedule to, the Statute Law Revision Act 1875 (38 & 39 Vict. c. 66), because it was spent.

== Subsequent developments ==
Sections 1, 4 and 7 of the act were repealed by section 1 of, and the schedule to, the Statute Law Revision Act 1875 (38 & 39 Vict. c. 66), which came into force on 11 August 1875.

The preamble to the act was repealed by section 1 of, and the schedule to, the Statute Law Revision Act 1891 (54 & 55 Vict. c. 67), which came into force on 5 August 1891.

Sections 2 and 3 of, and schedule (A) to, the act were repealed by section 1 of, and the schedule to, the Statute Law Revision Act 1963, which came into force on 31 July 1963.

== See also ==
- Piracy Act
