= Piracy Act 1670 =

Act of the Parliament of England

Piracy Act 1670 (Note: The citation of this act by this short title was authorised by section 5 of, and the second schedule to, the Statute Law Revision Act 1948. Due to the repeal of those provisions, it is now authorised by section 19(2) of the Interpretation Act 1978.)
- Act of Parliament
- Parliament of England
- Long title: An Act to prevent the delivery up of Merchants Shipps, and for the Increase of good and serviceable shipping. (Note: These words are printed against this act in the second column of the second schedule to the Statute Law Revision Act 1948, which is headed "Title".)
- Citation: 22 & 23 Cha. 2. c. 11
- Territorial extent: England and Wales

Dates
- Royal assent: 22 April 1671
- Commencement: 24 October 1670 (Note: Start of session.)
- Repealed: 10 March 1966
Other legislation
Amended by	Criminal Statutes Repeal Act 1827; Offences Against the Person Act 1828; Criminal Law (India) Act 1828; Statute Law Revision Act 1863; Statute Law Revision Act 1888
Repealed by	Statute Law Revision Act 1966

Status: Repealed

Text of statute as originally enacted

The Piracy Act 1670 (22 & 23 Cha. 2. c. 11) was an act of the Parliament of England.

== Subsequent developments ==
Section 12 of the act was repealed by section 1 of, and the schedule to, the Statute Law Revision Act 1863 (26 & 27 Vict. c. 125), which came into force on 28 July 1863.

The whole act was repealed by section 1 of, and the schedule to, the Statute Law Revision Act 1966, which came into force on 10 March 1966.

== See also ==
- Piracy Act
