= Territorial Waters Jurisdiction Act 1878 =

Act of the Parliament of the United Kingdom

Territorial Waters Jurisdiction Act 1878 (Note: Section 1.)
- Act of Parliament
- Parliament of the United Kingdom
- Long title: An Act to regulate the Law relating to the Trial of Offences committed on the Sea within a certain distance of the Coasts of Her Majesty's Dominions.
- Citation: 41 & 42 Vict. c. 73
- Territorial extent: United Kingdom

Dates
- Royal assent: 16 August 1878
- Commencement: 16 August 1878 (Note: The Acts of Parliament (Commencement) Act 1793.)
Other legislation
Amended by	Government of India (Adaptation of Acts of Parliament) Order 1937; Statute Law (Repeals) Act 1976; Territorial Sea Act 1987; Criminal Justice Act 2003
Relates to	Offences at Sea Act 1799; Piracy Act 1837

Status: Amended

Text of statute as originally enacted

Revised text of statute as amended

Text of the Territorial Waters Jurisdiction Act 1878 as in force today (including any amendments) within the United Kingdom, from legislation.gov.uk.

The Territorial Waters Jurisdiction Act 1878 (41 & 42 Vict. c. 73) is an act of the Parliament of the United Kingdom. It is still in force. It codifies the law relating to offences committed in the territorial waters of the United Kingdom, including crimes committed on foreign ships.

== Provisions ==
Under section 7 of the act, the applicable law is the law of England and Wales, even if the offence is committed off the coast of Scotland or Northern Ireland.

Section 3 of the act requires the consent of the Secretary of State to prosecute someone under the act if they are not a British subject.

== Subsequent developments ==
In section 7 of the act, the words "as respects India, means the Governor General and" were repealed by section 1(1) of, and part VII of schedule 1 to, the Statute Law (Repeals) Act 1976, which came into force on 27 May 1976.

== See also ==
- Offences at Sea Act 1799
- Piracy Act 1837

== Bibliography ==
- Paterson, William (ed). "Territorial Waters Jurisdiction Act, 1878". The Practical Statutes of the Session 1878. Law Times Office. London. 1878. Pages 341 to 346.
