= Sunday Fairs Act 1448 =

Act of the Parliament of England

Sunday Fairs Act 1448 (Note: The citation of this act by this short title was authorised by section 5 of, and the second schedule to, the Statute Law Revision Act 1948. Due to the repeal of those provisions, it is now authorised by section 19(2) of the Interpretation Act 1978.)
- Act of Parliament
- Parliament of England
- Long title: The scandal of holding fairs and markets on Sundays and upon high feast days ... (Note: These words are printed against this act in the second column of the second schedule to the Statute Law Revision Act 1948, which is headed "Title".)
- Citation: 27 Hen. 6. c. 5
- Territorial extent: England and Wales; Ireland

Dates
- Royal assent: 16 July 1449
- Commencement: 12 February 1449 (Note: Start of session.)
- Repealed: 1 January 1970

Other legislation
- Amended by: Fairs and Markets Act 1850; Statute Law Revision Act 1948
- Repealed by: Statute Law (Repeals) Act 1969

Status: Repealed

Text of statute as originally enacted

The Sunday Fairs Act 1448 (27 Hen. 6. c. 5) was an act of the Parliament of England.

== Subsequent developments ==
The act was extended to Ireland by Poynings' Law 1495 (10 Hen. 7. c. 22 (I)).

The exception of the four Sundays in Harvest was repealed by section 1 of the Fairs and Markets Act 1850 (13 & 14 Vict. c. 23).

The words from "Provided always that" to the end were repealed by section 1 of, and the first schedule to, the Statute Law Revision Act 1948 (11 & 12 Geo. 6. c. 62), which came into force on 30 July 1948.

The whole act was repealed by section 1 of, and part IV of the schedule to, the Statute Law (Repeals) Act 1969, which came into force on 1 January 1970. The repeal of the act does not have the effect of requiring any market or fair to be held on a Sunday, Good Friday, Ascension Day, Corpus Christi Day, the Feast of the Assumption of Our Blessed Lady or All Saints' Day; and a market or fair may continue to be held on any day on which it might lawfully have been held if the act had not been repealed.
