= Fairs and Markets Act 1850 =

Act of the Parliament of the United Kingdom

- Act of Parliament
- Parliament of the United Kingdom
- Long title: An Act to repeal an Exception in an Act of the Twenty-seventh Year of King Henry the Sixth concerning the Days whereon Fairs and Markets ought not to be kept.
- Citation: 13 & 14 Vict. c. 23
- Territorial extent: United Kingdom

Dates
- Royal assent: 10 June 1850
- Commencement: 10 June 1850 (Note: The Acts of Parliament (Commencement) Act 1793.)
- Repealed: 11 August 1875
Other legislation
Amends	Sunday Fairs Act 1448
Repealed by	Statute Law Revision Act 1875
Relates to	Sunday Observance Act 1780

Status: Repealed

Text of statute as originally enacted

The Fairs and Markets Act 1850 (13 & 14 Vict. c. 23) was an act of the Parliament of the United Kingdom. Among other things, it tightened restrictions on the Sunday operation of fairs and markets.

As late as 1899, it was noticed in Model byelaws, rules and regulations under the public health and other acts: with alternative and additional clauses.

== Subsequent developments ==
The whole act was repealed by section 1 of, and the schedule to, the Statute Law Revision Act 1875 (38 & 39 Vict. c. 66), which came into force on 11 August 1875.

== See also ==
- Sunday Observance Act 1780
