= Offences at Sea Act 1799 =

Act of the Parliament of Great Britain

Offences at Sea Act 1799 (Note: The citation of this act by this short title was authorised by section 1 of, and the first schedule to, the Short Titles Act 1896. Due to the repeal of those provisions it is now authorised by section 19(2) of the Interpretation Act 1978.)
- Act of Parliament
- Parliament of Great Britain
- Long title: An Act for remedying certain Defects in the Law respecting Offences committed upon the High Seas.
- Citation: 39 Geo. 3. c. 37
- Territorial extent: Great Britain

Dates
- Royal assent: 10 May 1799
- Commencement: 10 May 1799 (Note: The Acts of Parliament (Commencement) Act 1793.)
Other legislation
Amends	Offences at Sea Act 1536
Amended by	Criminal Law Act 1967
Relates to	Piracy Act 1837; Territorial Waters Jurisdiction Act 1878

Status: Amended

Text of statute as originally enacted

Revised text of statute as amended

Text of the Offences at Sea Act 1799 as in force today (including any amendments) within the United Kingdom, from legislation.gov.uk.

The Offences at Sea Act 1799 (39 Geo. 3. c. 37) is an act of the Parliament of Great Britain. It is still in force. It extended the jurisdiction of British courts to crimes committed by British subjects on the high seas. It does not apply to foreign citizens. (However crimes committed by foreigners in British territorial waters, or on board British ships on the high seas, can be prosecuted in British courts.) Jurisdiction over piracy on the high seas already existed before 1799, whether committed by British subjects or not.

The act appears to determine the sentence for piracy iure gentium in cases where section 2 of the Piracy Act 1837 (7 Will. 4 & 1 Vict. c. 88) does not apply.

== Provisions ==
Section 1 of the act now reads:

All and every offence and offences which after the passing of this Act shall be committed upon the high seas, out of the body of any county of this realm, shall be and they are hereby declared to be offences ... liable to the same punishments respectively, as if they had been committed upon the shore ...

== Subsequent developments ==
The preamble to, the words "of the same nature respectively, and to be" and the words from "and shall be inquired of" onwards in section 1, and section 2, of the act repealed for England and Wales by section 10(2) of, and part I of schedule 3 to, the Criminal Law Act 1967, which came into force on 1 January 1968.

== See also ==
- Offences at Sea Act
- Territorial Waters Jurisdiction Act 1878
- Piracy Act 1837
