= Navy Act 1748 =

Act of the Parliament of Great Britain

- Act of Parliament
- Parliament of Great Britain
- Long title: An Act for amending, explaining, and reducing into One Act of Parliament, the Laws relating to the Government of His Majesty's Ships, Vessels, and Forces by Sea.
- Citation: 22 Geo. 2. c. 33
- Territorial extent: Great Britain

Dates
- Royal assent: 26 May 1749
- Commencement: 25 December 1749 (Note: Section 1.)
- Repealed: 1 April 1861
Other legislation
Amends	See § Repealed enactments
Repeals/revokes	See § Repealed enactments
Amended by	Naval Mutiny Act 1847
Repealed by	Naval Discipline Act 1860

Status: Repealed

Text of statute as originally enacted

The Consolidation Act 1749 or the Navy Act 1748 (22 Geo. 2. c. 33) was an act of the Parliament of Great Britain passed in 1749 to reorganise the Royal Navy.

== Repealed enactments ==
Section 1 of the act repealed 6 enactments, listed in that section, effective 25 December 1749.

Section 26 of the act provided that the repeal of the enactments would not affect any prosecutions or punishments commenced or done under those enactments before 25 December 1749.

Citation	Short title	Title	Extent of repeal
13 Car. 2. st. 2. c. 9	Navy Act 1661	An act passed in the thirteenth year of the reign of King Charles the Second, intituled, An act for establishing articles and orders for the regulating and better government of his Majesty's navies, Ships of war, and forces by sea.	The whole act.
2 W. & M. st. 2. c. 2	Admiralty Act 1690	An act passed in the second year of the reign of King William and Queen Mary, intituled, An act concerning the commissioners of the admiralty.	As directs the form of an oath to be taken by every officer present, upon all trials of offenders by courts-martial, to be held by virtue of any commission to be granted by the lord high admiral, or the commissioners for executing the office of lord high admiral. I.e., section 4.
6 Geo. 1. c. 19	Perpetuation of Acts, etc., 1719	An act passed in the sixth year of the reign of King George the First, intituled, An act for making perpetual so much of an act made in the tenth year of the reign of Queen Anne, for the reviving and continuing several acts of parliament therein mentioned, as relates to the building and repairing county gaols; and also an act of the eleventh and twelfth years of the reign of King William the Third, for the more effectual suppression of piracy; and for making more effectual the act of the thirteenth year of the reign of King Charles the Second, intituled, An act for establishing articles and orders for the regulating and better government of his Majesty's navies, ships of war, and forces by sea.	As relates to the trial and punishment of persons who shall commit any of the crimes or offences mentioned in the said articles upon the shore, in any foreign part or parts.
8 Geo. 1. c. 24	Piracy Act 1721	An act passed in the eighth year of the reign of King George the First, intituled, An act for the more effectual suppressing of piracy.	As directs the punishment to be inflicted by a court martial upon any captain, commander, or other officer of any his Majesty's ships or vessels of war, who shall receive on board, or permit to be received on board, any goods or merchandizes whatsoever, in order to trade or merchandize with the fame (except the goods and merchandizes therein excepted).
18 Geo. 2. c. 35	Navy Act 1744	An act passed in the eighteenth year of the reign of his present Majesty, intituled An act for the regulating and better government of bis Majesty's navies, ships of war, and forces by sea; and for regulating the proceedings upon courts-martial in the sea service.	The whole act.
21 Geo. 2. c. 11	Navy Act 1747	An act passed in the twenty first year of the reign of his present Majesty, intituled, An act for further regulating the proceedings upon courts-martial in the sea service; and for extending the discipline of the navy to the crews of his Majesty's ships wrecked, loft, or taken; and for continuing to them their wages upon certain conditions.	The whole act.

== Subsequent developments ==
The Select Committee on Temporary Laws described this act as a Consolidation Act.

The whole act, so far as unrepealed, was repealed by section 86 of, and schedule to, the Naval Discipline Act 1860 (23 & 24 Vict. c. 123), which came into force on 1 April 1861.

== See also ==
- Destination Tables
