= Admiralty Act 1690 =

Act of the Parliament of England

Admiralty Act 1690 (Note: The citation of this act by this short title was authorised by section 1 of, and the first schedule to, the Short Titles Act 1896. Due to the repeal of those provisions it is now authorised by section 19(2) of the Interpretation Act 1978.)
- Act of Parliament
- Parliament of England
- Long title: An Act concerning the Commissioners of the Admiralty. (Note: These words are printed against this act in the second column of the first schedule to the Short Titles Act 1896, which is headed "Title".)
- Citation: 2 Will. & Mar. Sess. 2. c. 2
- Territorial extent: England and Wales

Dates
- Royal assent: 18 November 1690
- Commencement: 2 October 1690 (Note: Start of session.)
- Repealed: 1 April 1964
Other legislation
Amended by	Navy Act 1748
Repealed by	Defence (Transfer of Functions) (No. 1) Order 1964

Status: Repealed

Text of statute as originally enacted

The Admiralty Act 1690 (2 Will. & Mar. Sess. 2. c. 2) was an act of the Parliament of England.

== Subsequent developments ==
Section 4 of the act was repealed by the Navy Act 1748 (22 Geo. 2. c. 33).

The whole act was repealed by article 2(2) of, and part II of schedule 1 to, the Defence (Transfer of Functions) (No. 1) Order 1964 (SI 1964/488), which came into force on 1 April 1964.
