= Offences at Sea Act =

Stock short title used for legislation

Offences at Sea Act or Crimes at Sea Act (with its variations) is a stock short title used for legislation in Australia, New Zealand and the United Kingdom relating to the piracy and other offences within the jurisdiction of the admiralty.

== List ==
=== Australia ===
Commonwealth

- The Crimes at Sea Act 1979 (No 17)
- The Crimes at Sea Act 2000 (No 13)

New South Wales

- The Crimes (Offences at Sea) Act 1980 (No 145)
- The Crimes at Sea Act 1998 (No 173)

Northern Territory

- The Criminal Law (Offences at Sea) Act 1978
- The Crimes at Sea Act 2000 (No 73)

Queensland

- The Crimes at Sea Act 2001 (No 19)

South Australia

- The Crimes (Offences at Sea) Act 1980 (No 5)
- The Crimes at Sea Act 1998 (No 62)

Tasmania

- The Crimes (Offences at Sea) Act 1979 (No 69)
- The Crimes at Sea Act 1999 (No 11)

Victoria

- The Crimes (Offences at Sea) Act 1978 (No 9229)
- The Crimes at Sea Act 1999 (No 56)

Western Australia

- The Crimes (Offences at Sea) Act 1979 (No 96)
- The Crimes at Sea Act 2000

=== New Zealand ===
- The Offences at Sea Act 1953

=== United Kingdom ===
- The Offences at Sea Act 1536 (28 Hen. 8. c. 15)
- The Offences at Sea Act 1799 (39 Geo. 3. c. 37)
- The Offences at Sea Act 1806 (46 Geo. 3. c. 54) (repealed by section 10(2) of, and part I of schedule 3 to the Criminal Law Act 1967)
- The Offences at Sea Act 1820 (1 Geo. 4. c. 90) (the whole act, so far as unrepealed, was repealed by section 10(2) of, and part I of schedule 3 to, the Criminal Law Act 1967)

== See also ==
- List of short titles
