= Piracy Act 1721 =

Act of the Parliament of Great Britain

Piracy Act 1721 (Note: The citation of this act by this short title was authorised by section 1 of, and the first schedule to, the Short Titles Act 1896. Due to the repeal of those provisions it is now authorised by section 19(2) of the Interpretation Act 1978.)
- Act of Parliament
- Parliament of Great Britain
- Long title: An Act for the more effectual suppressing of Piracy
- Citation: 8 Geo. 1. c. 24
- Territorial extent: Great Britain

Dates
- Royal assent: 7 March 1722
- Commencement: 19 October 1721 (Note: Start of session.)
- Repealed: 5 November 1993
Other legislation
Amended by	Unlawful Games Act 1728; Navy Act 1748; Greenwich Hospital Act 1834; Piracy Act 1837; Statute Law Revision Act 1867; Statute Law Revision Act 1888; Criminal Law Act 1967
Repealed by	Statute Law (Repeals) Act 1993
Relates to	Piracy Act 1837

Status: Repealed

Text of statute as originally enacted

Revised text of statute as amended

The Piracy Act 1721 (8 Geo. 1. c. 24) was an act of the Parliament of Great Britain.

The long title and preamble of the act were:

An Act for the more effectual suppressing of Piracy. Whereas the number of persons committing piracies, felonies, and robberies upon the seas is of late very much increased, and notwithstanding the laws already made and now in being, many idle and profligate persons have turned pirates, and betaken themselves to that wicked course of life, whereby the trade and navigation into remote parts will greatly suffer unless some further provision be speedily made for bringing such persons and all others who shall be any ways aiding and assisting, or in confederacy with them, to condign punishment:

== Subsequent developments ==
The act was made perpetual by section 7 of the Unlawful Games Act 1728 (2 Geo. 2. c. 28).

Parts of the act were superseded by the Piracy Act 1837 (7 Will. 4 & 1 Vict. c. 88).

In section 1, the words from " and he " to " suppressing of piracy ", and section 3 of the act, were repealed by section 10(2) of, and part I of schedule 3 to, the Criminal Law Act 1967, which came into force on 1 January 1968.

The whole act was repealed by section 1(1) of, and group 2 of part I of schedule 1 to, the Statute Law (Repeals) Act 1993, which came into force on 5 November 1993.

== See also ==
- 1717–1718 Acts of Grace
