= Offences at Sea Act 1536 =

Act of the Parliament of England

Offences at Sea Act 1536 (Note: The citation of this act by this short title was authorised by section 1 of, and the first schedule to, the Short Titles Act 1896. Due to the repeal of those provisions it is now authorised by section 19(2) of the Interpretation Act 1978.)
- Act of Parliament
- Parliament of England
- Long title: An Act for punysshement of Pyrotes and Robbers of the See. (Note: These words are printed against this act in the second column of the first schedule to the Short Titles Act 1896, which is headed "Title".)
- Citation: 28 Hen. 8. c. 15
- Territorial extent: England and Wales

Dates
- Royal assent: 18 July 1536
- Commencement: 8 June 1536 (Note: Start of session.)
- Repealed: 1 January 1968
Other legislation
Amended by	Piracy Act 1698; Offences at Sea Act 1799; Piracy Act 1837; Statute Law Revision Act 1888
Repealed by	Criminal Law Act 1967
Relates to	Continuance of Laws, etc. Act 1724

Status: Repealed

Text of statute as originally enacted

The Offences at Sea Act 1536 (28 Hen. 8. c. 15) was an act of the Parliament of England.

== Subsequent developments ==
The whole act was repealed by section 10(2) of, and part I of schedule 3 to, the Criminal Law Act 1967, which came into force on 1 January 1968.

== See also ==
- Offences at Sea Act

== Bibliography ==
- Matthew Norton. The Punishment of Pirates: Interpretation and Institutional Order in the Early Modern British Empire. University of Chicago Press. 2023. pp 65, 90, 91, 95, 105 to 108, 114, 120 and 193 to 195.
- "The Offences at Sea Act, 1536". The Complete Statutes of England. 1929. vol 4. p 298 et seq. See also preliminary note and passim.
- Francis Piggott. Nationality. 1907. Part II. pp 89, 90, 133, 134, 149 to 151, 154, 156, 157, 162, 163, 181 and 188.
- William Oldnall Russell, Horace Smith and A P Perceval Keep. A Treatise on Crimes and Misdemeanors. 6th Edition. 1896. pp 9, 10, 13, 17, 18, 21, 260 to 264, 266 to 268.
- Bacon, Gwyllim, Dodd, Wilson and Bouvier. A New Abridgment of the Law. Philadelphia. 1860. pp 741 to 743.
