= Piracy Act 1837 =

Act of the Parliament of the United Kingdom

Piracy Act 1837 (Note: The citation of this act by this short title was authorised by section 1 of, and the first schedule to, the Short Titles Act 1896. Due to the repeal of those provisions it is now authorised by section 19(2) of the Interpretation Act 1978.)
- Act of Parliament
- Parliament of the United Kingdom
- Long title: An Act to amend certain Acts relating to the Crime of Piracy.
- Citation: 7 Will. 4 & 1 Vict. c. 88
- Territorial extent: United Kingdom

Dates
- Royal assent: 17 July 1837
- Commencement: 1 October 1837 (Note: Section 7.)

Other legislation
- Amends: Offences at Sea Act 1536; Piracy Act 1698; Piracy Act 1717; Piracy Act 1721; Piracy Act 1744
- Amended by: Statute Law Revision Act 1874; Criminal Law Act 1967; Northern Ireland (Emergency Provisions) Act 1973; Crime and Disorder Act 1998
- Relates to: Offences at Sea Act 1799; Territorial Waters Jurisdiction Act 1878

Status: Amended

Text of statute as originally enacted

Revised text of statute as amended

Text of the Piracy Act 1837 as in force today (including any amendments) within the United Kingdom, from legislation.gov.uk.

The Piracy Act 1837 (7 Will. 4 & 1 Vict. c. 88) is an act of the Parliament of the United Kingdom. It abolished the death penalty for most offences of piracy, but created a new offence often known as piracy with violence, which was punishable with death. This offence still exists in the United Kingdom and in Ireland, but is no longer punishable by death in either country.

Section 2 of the act creates the offence of piracy with violence:

Whosoever, with intent to commit or at the time of or immediately before or immediately after committing the crime of piracy in respect of any ship or vessel, shall assault, with intent to murder, any person being on board of or belonging to such ship or vessel, or shall stab, cut, or wound any such person, or unlawfully do any act by which the life of such person may be endangered, shall be guilty of felony...

== United Kingdom ==
The offences of piracy which existed in 1837 have since been abolished. The "crime of piracy" mentioned in section 2 is now defined by the Merchant Shipping and Maritime Security Act 1997 (in section 26 and Schedule 5), which simply sets out articles 101 to 103 of the United Nations Convention on the Law of the Sea (1982):

Article 101

Definition of piracy

Piracy consists of any of the following acts:

- (a) any illegal acts of violence or detention, or any act of depredation, committed for private ends by the crew or the passengers of a private ship or a private aircraft, and directed—
  - (i) on the high seas, against another ship or aircraft, or against persons or property on board such ship or aircraft;
  - (ii) against a ship, aircraft, persons or property in a place outside the jurisdiction of any State;
- (b) any act of voluntary participation in the operation of a ship or of an aircraft with knowledge of facts making it a pirate ship or aircraft;
- (c) any act of inciting or of intentionally facilitating an act described in subparagraph (a) or (b).

Article 102

Piracy by a warship, government ship or government aircraft whose crew has mutinied

The acts of piracy, as defined in article 101, committed by a warship, government ship or government aircraft whose crew has mutinied and taken control of the ship or aircraft are assimilated to acts committed by a private ship or aircraft.

Article 103

Definition of a pirate ship or aircraft

A ship or aircraft is considered a pirate ship or aircraft if it is intended by the persons in dominant control to be used for the purpose of committing one of the acts referred to in article 101. The same applies if the ship or aircraft has been used to commit any such act, so long as it remains under the control of the persons guilty of that act.

Since this definition is restricted to the high seas, piracy in British territorial waters would today be treated as robbery, assault or attempted murder under the Territorial Waters Jurisdiction Act 1878, or as hijacking under the Aviation and Maritime Security Act 1990 (which can also be applied to piracy on the high seas).

In 1998 the mandatory death penalty was abolished by the Crime and Disorder Act 1998, and the sentence is now up to life imprisonment.

== Ireland ==
Ireland abolished the death penalty for piracy in 1964. The act remains in force.

== Subsequent developments ==
In section 2 the words " as a felon ", and section 4, of the act were repealed for England and Wales by section 10(2) of, and part III of schedule 3 to, the Criminal Law Act 1967, which came into force on 1 January 1968.

== See also ==
- Capital punishment in the United Kingdom
- Capital punishment in Ireland
- Piracy Act 1698 (repealed)
- Piracy Act 1717 (repealed)
- Piracy Act 1721 (repealed)
- Judgement of Death Act 1823
