= List of acts of the Parliament of the United Kingdom from 1850 =

This is a complete list of acts of the Parliament of the United Kingdom for the year 1850.

Note that the first parliament of the United Kingdom was held in 1801; parliaments between 1707 and 1800 were either parliaments of Great Britain or of Ireland). For acts passed up until 1707, see the list of acts of the Parliament of England and the list of acts of the Parliament of Scotland. For acts passed from 1707 to 1800, see the list of acts of the Parliament of Great Britain. See also the list of acts of the Parliament of Ireland.

For acts of the devolved parliaments and assemblies in the United Kingdom, see the list of acts of the Scottish Parliament, the list of acts of the Northern Ireland Assembly, and the list of acts and measures of Senedd Cymru; see also the list of acts of the Parliament of Northern Ireland.

The number shown after each act's title is its chapter number. Acts passed before 1963 are cited using this number, preceded by the year(s) of the reign during which the relevant parliamentary session was held; thus the Union with Ireland Act 1800 is cited as "39 & 40 Geo. 3 c. 67", meaning the 67th act passed during the session that started in the 39th year of the reign of George III and which finished in the 40th year of that reign. Note that the modern convention is to use Arabic numerals in citations (thus "41 Geo. 3" rather than "41 Geo. III"). Acts of the last session of the Parliament of Great Britain and the first session of the Parliament of the United Kingdom are both cited as "41 Geo. 3".

Some of these acts have a short title. Some of these acts have never had a short title. Some of these acts have a short title given to them by later acts, such as by the Short Titles Act 1896.

== 13 & 14 Vict. ==
The third session of the 15th Parliament of the United Kingdom, which met from 31 January 1850 until 15 August 1850.

=== Public general acts ===
Short title	Citation	Royal assent
Long title
County Cess (Ireland) Act 1850 (repealed)	13 & 14 Vict. c. 1	22 February 1850
An Act to amend an Act of the last Session (Note: County Cess (Ireland) Act 1849 (12 & 13 Vict. c. 36)) for making Provision for the Collection of County Cess in Ireland, and for the Remuneration of the Collectors thereof. (Repealed by Statute Law Revision Act 1875 (38 & 39 Vict. c. 66))
Party Processions (Ireland) Act 1850 (repealed)	13 & 14 Vict. c. 2	12 March 1850
An Act to restrain Party Processions in Ireland. (Repealed by Party Processions Act (Ireland) Repeal Act 1872 (35 & 36 Vict. c. 22))
Supply Act 1850 (repealed)	13 & 14 Vict. c. 3	25 March 1850
An Act to apply the Sum of Eight Millions out of the Consolidated Fund to the Service of the Year One thousand eight hundred and fifty. (Repealed by Statute Law Revision Act 1875 (38 & 39 Vict. c. 66))
Bridges (Ireland) Act 1850 (repealed)	13 & 14 Vict. c. 4	25 March 1850
An Act for requiring the Transmission of annual Abstracts of Accounts and Statements of Trustees or Commissioners of Turnpike Roads and Bridges in Ireland to the Lord Lieutenant to be laid before Parliament. (Repealed by Statute Law Revision Act 1875 (38 & 39 Vict. c. 66), Administration of Justice Act (Northern Ireland) 1954 (c. 9 (N.I.)) and Statute Law Revision Act (Northern Ireland) 1954 (c. 35 (N.I.)))
Mutiny Act 1850 (repealed)	13 & 14 Vict. c. 5	25 March 1850
An Act for punishing Mutiny and Desertion, and for the better Payment of the Army and their Quarters. (Repealed by Statute Law Revision Act 1875 (38 & 39 Vict. c. 66))
Marine Mutiny Act 1850 (repealed)	13 & 14 Vict. c. 6	25 March 1850
An Act for the Regulation of Her Majesty's Royal Marine Forces while on shore. (Repealed by Statute Law Revision Act 1875 (38 & 39 Vict. c. 66))
London Hackney Carriages Act 1850	13 & 14 Vict. c. 7	25 March 1850
An Act for consolidating the Office of the Registrar of Metropolitan Public Carriages with the Office of Commissioners of Police of the Metropolis, and making other Provisions in regard to the consolidated Offices.
Annual Inclosure Act 1850 or the Inclosures Act 1850	13 & 14 Vict. c. 8	17 May 1850
An Act to authorize the Inclosure of certain Lands in pursuance of the Fifth Annual General Report of the Inclosure Commissioners for England and Wales, and to confirm the Proceedings in the Matter of the Common Wood Inclosure.
Brick Duties Repeal Act 1850 (repealed)	13 & 14 Vict. c. 9	17 May 1850
An Act to repeal the Duties and Drawbacks of Excise on Bricks. (Repealed by Statute Law Revision Act 1875 (38 & 39 Vict. c. 66))
Exchequer Bills Act 1850 (repealed)	13 & 14 Vict. c. 10	17 May 1850
An Act for raising the Sum of Nine millions two hundred thousand Pounds by Exchequer Bills, for the Service of the Year One thousand eight hundred and fifty. (Repealed by Statute Law Revision Act 1875 (38 & 39 Vict. c. 66))
School Districts Act 1850 (repealed)	13 & 14 Vict. c. 11	17 May 1850
An Act to make better Provision for the Contributions of Unions and Parishes in School Districts to the common Funds of the respective Districts. (Repealed by Statute Law Revision Act 1875 (38 & 39 Vict. c. 66))
Indemnity Act 1850 (repealed)	13 & 14 Vict. c. 12	17 May 1850
An Act to indemnify such Persons in the United Kingdom as have omitted to qualify themselves for Offices and Employments, and to extend the Time limited for those Purposes respectively. (Repealed by Promissory Oaths Act 1871 (34 & 35 Vict. c. 48))
Religious Congregations, etc. (Scotland) Act 1850 (repealed)	13 & 14 Vict. c. 13	17 May 1850
An Act to render more simple and effectual the Titles by which Congregations or Societies associated for Purposes of Religious Worship or Education in Scotland hold Real Property required for such Purposes. (Repealed by Titles to Land Consolidation (Scotland) Act 1868 (31 & 32 Vict. c. 101))
Distressed Unions Advances (Ireland) Act 1850 (repealed)	13 & 14 Vict. c. 14	17 May 1850
An Act to authorize a further Advance of Money to certain distressed Poor Law Unions, and to make Provision for the Repayment of Advances made and authorized to be made to Poor Law Unions and other Districts in Ireland. (Repealed by Statute Law Revision Act 1861 (24 & 25 Vict. c. 101))
West Indian Courts of Appeal Act 1850 (repealed)	13 & 14 Vict. c. 15	31 May 1850
An Act to authorize the Establishment of Courts of Appeal for certain of Her Majesty's West India Colonies. (Repealed by Windward Islands Appeal Court Act 1889 (52 & 53 Vict. c. 33))
Supreme Court (England) Act 1850 (repealed)	13 & 14 Vict. c. 16	31 May 1850
An Act to enable the Judges of the Courts of Common Law at Westminster to alter the Forms of Pleading. (Repealed by Statute Law Revision Act 1875 (38 & 39 Vict. c. 66))
Leases Act 1850 (repealed)	13 & 14 Vict. c. 17	31 May 1850
An Act to amend an Act of the last Session of Parliament, (Note: Leases Act 1849 (12 & 13 Vict. c. 26)) for granting Relief against Defects in Leases made under Powers of Leasing. (Repealed for England and Wales by Law of Property Act 1925 (15 & 16 Geo. 5. c. 20))
Supreme Court (Ireland) Act 1850 (repealed)	13 & 14 Vict. c. 18	31 May 1850
An Act for the Regulation of Process and Practice in the Superior Courts of Common Law in Ireland. (Repealed by Statute Law Revision Act 1892 (55 & 56 Vict. c. 19))
Supreme Court (Ireland) (Amendment) Act 1850 (repealed)	13 & 14 Vict. c. 19	10 June 1850
An Act to explain and amend an Act (Note: Supreme Court (Ireland) Act 1850 (13 & 14 Vict. c. 18)) for the Regulation of Process and Practice in the Superior Courts of Common Law in Ireland. (Repealed by Statute Law Revision Act 1875 (38 & 39 Vict. c. 66))
Parish Constables Act 1850 (repealed)	13 & 14 Vict. c. 20	10 June 1850
An Act to amend an Act of the Fifth and Sixth Years of Her present Majesty, (Note: Parish Constables Act 1842 (5 & 6 Vict. c. 109)) for the Appointment and Payment of Parish Constables. (Repealed by Statute Law Revision Act 1966 (c. 5))
Interpretation Act 1850 or Lord Brougham's Act (repealed)	13 & 14 Vict. c. 21	10 June 1850
An Act for shortening the Language used in Acts of Parliament. (Repealed by Interpretation Act 1889 (52 & 53 Vict. c. 63))
Exchequer Bills (No. 2) Act 1850 (repealed)	13 & 14 Vict. c. 22	10 June 1850
An Act for raising the Sum of Eight millions five hundred and fifty-eight thousand seven hundred Pounds by Exchequer Bills, for the Service of the Year One thousand eight hundred and fifty. (Repealed by Statute Law Revision Act 1875 (38 & 39 Vict. c. 66))
Fairs and Markets Act 1850 (repealed)	13 & 14 Vict. c. 23	10 June 1850
An Act to repeal an Exception in an Act of the Twenty-seventh Year of King Henry the Sixth (Note: Sunday Fairs Act 1448 (27 Hen. 6. c. 5)) concerning the Days whereon Fairs and Markets ought not to be kept. (Repealed by Statute Law Revision Act 1875 (38 & 39 Vict. c. 66))
Greenwich Hospital Act 1850 or the Greenwich Hospital Improvement Act 1850	13 & 14 Vict. c. 24	25 June 1850
An Act to enable the Commissioners of Greenwich Hospital to improve the said Hospital, and also to enlarge and improve the Billingsgate Dock, and widen Billingsgate Street, in Greenwich; and for other Purposes.
Justice of Assizes Act 1850 (repealed)	13 & 14 Vict. c. 25	25 June 1850
An Act to enable Queen's Counsel and others, not being of the Degree of the Coif, to act as Judges of Assize. (Repealed by Statute Law Revision Act 1875 (38 & 39 Vict. c. 66))
Piracy Act 1850 or the Pirates (Head Money) Repeal Act 1850	13 & 14 Vict. c. 26	25 June 1850
An Act to repeal an Act of the Sixth Year of King George the Fourth, (Note: Piratical Ships Act 1825 (6 Geo. 4. c. 49)) for encouraging the Capture or Destruction of Piratical Ships and Vessels; and to make other Provisions in lieu thereof.
Pirates (Head Money) Repeal Act Commencement Act 1850 (repealed)	13 & 14 Vict. c. 27	15 July 1850
An Act to provide for the Commencement of an Act of the present Session, intituled "An Act to repeal an Act of the Sixth Year of King George the Fourth, for encouraging the Capture or Destruction of Piratical Ships and Vessels; and to make other Provisions in lieu thereof." (Note: Piracy Act 1850 (13 & 14 Vict. c. 26)) (Repealed by Statute Law Revision Act 1875 (38 & 39 Vict. c. 66))
Trustee Appointment Act 1850 (repealed)	13 & 14 Vict. c. 28	15 July 1850
An Act to render more simple and effectual the Titles by which Congregations or Societies for Purposes of Religious Worship or Education in England and Ireland hold Property for such Purposes. (Repealed by Charities Act 1960 (8 & 9 Eliz. 2. c. 58))
Judgment Mortgage (Ireland) Act 1850 (repealed)	13 & 14 Vict. c. 29	15 July 1850
An Act to amend the Laws concerning Judgments in Ireland. (Repealed by Judgments (Enforcement) Act (Northern Ireland) 1969 (c. 30 (N.I.)))
Sheriff of Westmorland Act 1850 (repealed)	13 & 14 Vict. c. 30	15 July 1850
An Act to provide for the Appointment of Sheriff of the County of Westmorland. (Repealed by Sheriffs Act 1887 (50 & 51 Vict. c. 55))
Public Money Drainage Act 1850 (repealed)	13 & 14 Vict. c. 31	15 July 1850
An Act to authorize further Advances of Money for Drainage and the improvement of Landed Property in the United Kingdom, and to amend the Acts relating to such Advances. (Repealed by Statute Law Revision Act 1958 (6 & 7 Eliz. 2. c. 46))
Public Health Supplemental Act 1850	13 & 14 Vict. c. 32	15 July 1850
An Act for confirming certain Provisional Orders of the General Board of Health.
	Stratford upon Avon	
	Dartford	
	Newport	
	Brecon	
	Harrow	
	Derby	
	Dover	
	Chelmsford	
	York	
Police (Scotland) Act 1850 or the Police of Towns (Scotland) Act 1850 or the Policing of Towns (Scotland) Act 1850 or the Police of Towns Improvement Act 1850 or Lock's Act (repealed)	13 & 14 Vict. c. 33	15 July 1850
An Act to make more effectual Prevision for regulating the Police of Towns and populous Places in Scotland and for paving, draining, cleansing, lighting, and improving the same. (Repealed by Burgh Police (Scotland) Act 1892 (55 & 56 Vict. c. 55))
Turnpike Acts (Ireland) Continuance Act 1850 (repealed)	13 & 14 Vict. c. 34	15 July 1850
An Act to continue certain Acts for regulating Turnpike Roads in Ireland. (Repealed by Statute Law Revision Act 1875 (38 & 39 Vict. c. 66))
Court of Chancery (England) Act 1850 (repealed)	13 & 14 Vict. c. 35	15 July 1850
An Act to diminish the Delay and Expense of Proceedings in the High Court of Chancery in England. (Repealed by Statute Law Revision and Civil Procedure Act 1883 (46 & 47 Vict. c. 49))
Court of Session Act 1850	13 & 14 Vict. c. 36	29 July 1850
An Act to facilitate Procedure in the Court of Session in Scotland.
Larceny Act 1850 (repealed)	13 & 14 Vict. c. 37	29 July 1850
An Act for the further Extension of Summary Jurisdiction in Cases of Larceny. (Repealed by Statute Law Revision Act 1892 (55 & 56 Vict. c. 19))
Marriages Confirmation Act 1850 (repealed)	13 & 14 Vict. c. 38	29 July 1850
An Act to render valid certain Marriages solemnized in the new Church at Upton cum Chalvey in the County of Buckingham and Diocese of Oxford. (Repealed by Statute Law (Repeals) Act 1977 (c. 18))
Convict Prisons Act 1850 (repealed)	13 & 14 Vict. c. 39	29 July 1850
An Act for the better Government of Convict Prisons. (Repealed by Criminal Justice Act 1948 (11 & 12 Geo. 6. c. 58))
Naval Prize Act 1850 (repealed)	13 & 14 Vict. c. 40	29 July 1850
An Act to regulate the Disposition of the Naval Prize Balance. (Repealed by Naval Prize Acts Repeal Act 1864 (27 & 28 Vict. c. 23))
Parish of Manchester Division Act 1850	13 & 14 Vict. c. 41	29 July 1850
An Act to authorise the Division of the Parish of Manchester into several Parishes, and for the Application of the Revenues of the Collegiate and Parish Church, and for other Purposes.
Incorporation of Boroughs Act 1850 (repealed)	13 & 14 Vict. c. 42	29 July 1850
An Act to confirm the Incorporation of certain Boroughs, and to provide for the Payment of the Expenses of the Incorporation of new Boroughs. (Repealed by Municipal Corporations Act 1882 (45 & 46 Vict. c. 50))
Court of Chancery of Lancaster Act 1850 (repealed)	13 & 14 Vict. c. 43	29 July 1850
An Act to amend the Practice and Proceedings of the Court of Chancery of the County Palatine of Lancaster. (Repealed by Courts Act 1971 (c. 23))
Census (Ireland) Act 1850 (repealed)	13 & 14 Vict. c. 44	29 July 1850
An Act for taking an Account of the Population of Ireland. (Repealed by Statute Law Revision Act 1875 (38 & 39 Vict. c. 66))
Loan Societies Act 1850 (repealed)	13 & 14 Vict. c. 45	29 July 1850
An Act to continue an Act (Note: Loan Societies Act 1840 (3 & 4 Vict. c. 110)) to amend the Laws relating to Loan Societies. (Repealed by Statute Law Revision Act 1875 (38 & 39 Vict. c. 66))
Militia Ballots Suspension Act 1850 (repealed)	13 & 14 Vict. c. 46	29 July 1850
An Act to suspend the making of Lists and the Ballots and Enrolments for the Militia of the United Kingdom. (Repealed by Statute Law Revision Act 1875 (38 & 39 Vict. c. 66))
Ecclesiastical Jurisdiction Act 1850 (repealed)	13 & 14 Vict. c. 47	29 July 1850
An Act for further continuing certain temporary Provisions concerning Ecclesiastical Jurisdiction in England. (Repealed by Statute Law Revision Act 1875 (38 & 39 Vict. c. 66))
Linen, etc., Manufactures (Ireland) Act 1850 (repealed)	13 & 14 Vict. c. 48	29 July 1850
An Act to continue certain Acts relating to Linen, Hempen,, and other Manufactures in Ireland. (Repealed by Statute Law Revision Act 1875 (38 & 39 Vict. c. 66))
Militia Pay Act 1850 (repealed)	13 & 14 Vict. c. 49	29 July 1850
An Act to defray the Charge of the Pay, Clothing, and contingent and other Expenses of the Disembodied Militia in Great Britain and Ireland; to grant Allowances in certain Cases to Subaltern Officers, Adjutants, Paymasters, Quartermasters, Surgeons, Assistant Surgeons, Surgeons Mates, and Serjeant Majors of the Militia; and to authorize the Employment of the Non-commissioned Officers. (Repealed by Statute Law Revision Act 1875 (38 & 39 Vict. c. 66))
Poor Rates Act 1850 (repealed)	13 & 14 Vict. c. 50	29 July 1850
An Act to continue the Exemption of Inhabitants from Liability to be rated as such in respect of Stock in Trade or other Property to the Relief of the Poor. (Repealed by Statute Law Revision Act 1875 (38 & 39 Vict. c. 66))
Exchequer Equitable Jurisdiction (Ireland) Act 1850 or the Court of Exchequer (Ireland) Act 1850 (repealed)	13 & 14 Vict. c. 51	29 July 1850
An Act for the Transfer of the Equitable Jurisdiction of the Court of Exchequer to the Court of Chancery in Ireland. (Repealed by Statute Law Revision Act 1892 (55 & 56 Vict. c. 19))
Metropolitan Interments Act 1850 (repealed)	13 & 14 Vict. c. 52	5 August 1850
An Act to make better Provision for the Interment of the Dead in and near the Metropolis. (Repealed by Burial Act 1852 (15 & 16 Vict. c. 85))
Census, Great Britain Act 1850 (repealed)	13 & 14 Vict. c. 53	5 August 1850
An Act for taking account of the Population of Great Britain. (Repealed by Statute Law Revision Act 1875 (38 & 39 Vict. c. 66))
Factory Act 1850 or the Factories Act 1850 or the Compromise Act 1850 (repealed)	13 & 14 Vict. c. 54	5 August 1850
An Act to amend the Acts relating to labour in factories. (Repealed by Factory and Workshop Act 1878 (41 & 42 Vict. c. 16))
Corporation of Dublin Act 1850 (repealed)	13 & 14 Vict. c. 55	5 August 1850
An Act to amend an Act of the last Session (Note: Dublin Corporation Act 1849 (12 & 13 Vict. c. 85)) for amending an Act (Note: Municipal Corporations Act (Ireland) 1840 (3 & 4 Vict. c. 108)) for the Regulation of Municipal Corporations in Ireland so far as relates to the Borough of Dublin. (Repealed by Statute Law Revision Act 1875 (38 & 39 Vict. c. 66))
Usury Act 1850 (repealed)	13 & 14 Vict. c. 56	5 August 1850
An Act to continue the Act (Note: Usury Act 1839 (2 & 3 Vict. c. 37)) for exempting certain Bills of Exchange and Promissory Notes from the Operation of the Usury Laws. (Repealed by Usury Laws Repeal Act 1854 (17 & 18 Vict. c. 90))
Vestries Act 1850 (repealed)	13 & 14 Vict. c. 57	5 August 1850
An Act to prevent the holding of Vestry or other Meetings in Churches, and for regulating the Appointment of Vestry Clerks. (Repealed by Local Government Act 1933 (23 & 24 Geo. 5. c. 51) and London Government Order 1965 (SI 1965/654))
Highway Rates Act 1850 (repealed)	13 & 14 Vict. c. 58	5 August 1850
An Act to continue an Act (Note: Application of Highway Rates to Turnpikes Act 1841 (4 & 5 Vict. c. 59)) for authorizing the Application of Highway Rates to Turnpike Roads. (Repealed by Statute Law Revision Act 1875 (38 & 39 Vict. c. 66))
Australian Constitutions Act 1850 or the Australian Colonies Government Act 1850	13 & 14 Vict. c. 59	5 August 1850
An Act for the better Government of Her Majesty's Australian Colonies.
Trustee Act 1850 (repealed)	13 & 14 Vict. c. 60	5 August 1850
An Act to consolidate and amend the Laws relating to the Conveyance and Transfer of Real and Personal Property vested in Mortgagees and Trustees. (Repealed for England and Wales by Statute Law Revision Act 1875 (38 & 39 Vict. c. 66), Lunacy Act 1890 (53 & 54 Vict. c. 5), Statute Law Revision Act 1891 (54 & 55 Vict. c. 67), Trustee Act 1893 (56 & 57 Vict. c. 53) and Statute Law Revision Act 1894 (57 & 58 Vict. c. 56) and for Northern Ireland by Mental Health (Northern Ireland) Order 1986 (SI 1986/595 (N.I. 4)))
County Courts Act 1850 (repealed)	13 & 14 Vict. c. 61	14 August 1850
An Act to extend the Act (Note: County Courts Act 1846 (9 & 10 Vict. c. 95)) for the more easy Recovery of Small Debts and Demands in England, and to amend the same. (Repealed by County Courts Act 1888 (51 & 52 Vict. c. 43))
Navy Pay Act 1850 (repealed)	13 & 14 Vict. c. 62	14 August 1850
An Act to alter and extend an Act passed in the Eleventh Year of King George the Fourth, (Note: Pay of the Navy Act 1830 (11 Geo. 4 & 1 Will. 4. c. 20)) for amending and consolidating the Laws relating to the Pay of the Royal Navy. (Repealed by Admiralty, &c. Acts Repeal Act 1865 (28 & 29 Vict. c. 112))
Equivalent Company Act 1850 (repealed)	13 & 14 Vict. c. 63	14 August 1850
An Act to provide for the Redemption of an Annuity of Ten thousand Pounds payable to the "Equivalent Company." (Repealed by Statute Law Revision Act 1875 (38 & 39 Vict. c. 66))
Bridges Act 1850 (repealed)	13 & 14 Vict. c. 64	14 August 1850
An Act to provide for more effectually maintaining, repairing, improving, and rebuilding Bridges in Cities and Boroughs. (Repealed by Municipal Corporations Act 1882 (45 & 46 Vict. c. 50))
Public Libraries Act 1850 or the Public Libraries and Museums Act 1850 (repealed)	13 & 14 Vict. c. 65	14 August 1850
An Act for enabling Town Councils to establish Public Libraries and Museums. (Repealed by Public Libraries Act 1855 (18 & 19 Vict. c. 70))
Inclosures Act 1850	13 & 14 Vict. c. 66	14 August 1850
An Act to authorize the Inclosure of certain Lands in pursuance of a Special Report of the Inclosure Commissioners for England and Wales.
Brewers' Licensing Act 1850 (repealed)	13 & 14 Vict. c. 67	14 August 1850
An Act to reduce the Duty of Excise on Sugar manufactured in the United Kingdom, and to impose a countervailing Duty on Sugar used in the brewing of Beer for Sale; and also to amend the Laws relating to the Licences granted to Brewers and Distillers. (Repealed by Finance (1909-10) Act 1910 (10 Edw. 7 & 1 Geo. 5. c. 8))
Parliamentary Elections (Ireland) Act 1850 (repealed)	13 & 14 Vict. c. 68	14 August 1850
An Act to shorten the Duration of Elections in Ireland, and for establishing additional Places for taking the Poll thereat. (Repealed by Representation of the People Act 1948 (11 & 12 Geo. 6. c. 65))
Representation of the People (Ireland) Act 1850 (repealed)	13 & 14 Vict. c. 69	14 August 1850
An Act to amend the Laws which regulate the Qualification and Registration of Parliamentary Voters in Ireland, and to alter the Law for rating Immediate Lessors of Premises to the Poor Rate in certain Boroughs. (Repealed by Representation of the People Act 1949 (12, 13 & 14 Geo. 6. c. 68))
Canterbury Association (New Zealand) Act 1850 or the Canterbury Settlements Lands Act 1850 (repealed)	13 & 14 Vict. c. 70	14 August 1850
An Act empowering the Canterbury Association to dispose of certain Lands in New Zealand. (Repealed by Statute Law (Repeals) Act 1989 (c. 43))
Sheep and Cattle Disease Prevention Act 1850 (repealed)	13 & 14 Vict. c. 71	14 August 1850
An Act to continue an Act of the Eleventh and Twelfth Years of the Reign of Her present Majesty, intituled "An Act to prevent, until the First Day of September One thousand eight hundred and fifty, and to the End of the then Session of Parliament, the spreading of contagious or infectious Disorders among Sheep, Cattle, and other Animals." (Note: Contagious Disorders (Sheep), etc. Act 1848 (11 & 12 Vict. c. 107)) (Repealed by Statute Law Revision Act 1875 (38 & 39 Vict. c. 66))
Registration of Assurances (Ireland) Act 1850 (repealed)	13 & 14 Vict. c. 72	14 August 1850
An Act to amend the Laws for the Registration of Assurances of Lands in Ireland. (Repealed by Criminal Statutes Repeal Act 1861 (24 & 25 Vict. c. 95), Statute Law Revision Act 1875 (38 & 39 Vict. c. 66), Statute Law Revision Act 1891 (54 & 55 Vict. c. 67) and Statute Law Revision Act (Northern Ireland) 1954 (c. 35 (N.I.)))
Attachment of Goods (Ireland) Act 1850 (repealed)	13 & 14 Vict. c. 73	14 August 1850
An Act to amend the Law relating to Proceedings by Process of Attachment of Goods in the Borough and other Courts of Record in Ireland. (Repealed by Judicature (Northern Ireland) Act 1978 (c. 23))
Judgments Registry (Ireland) Act 1850 (repealed)	13 & 14 Vict. c. 74	14 August 1850
An Act for the better Regulation of the Office of Registrar of Judgments in Ireland. (Repealed by Judgments (Enforcement) Act (Northern Ireland) 1969 (c. 30 (N.I.)))
Court of Common Pleas Act 1850 (repealed)	13 & 14 Vict. c. 75	14 August 1850
An Act to regulate the Receipt and Amount of Fees receivable by certain Officers in the Court of Common Pleas. (Repealed by Civil Procedure Acts Repeal Act 1879 (42 & 43 Vict. c. 59))
Division of Deanery of Saint Burian Act 1850	13 & 14 Vict. c. 76	14 August 1850
An Act to provide for the Division of the Deanery of Saint Burian into Three Rectories, and for abolishing the Royal Peculiar of Saint Burian.
Annuities to Duke and Princess Mary of Cambridge Act 1850 (repealed)	13 & 14 Vict. c. 77	14 August 1850
An Act to enable Her Majesty to make a suitable Provision for His Royal Highness the Duke of Cambridge, and also for Her Royal Highness the Princess Mary of Cambridge. (Repealed by Statute Law Revision Act 1953 (2 & 3 Eliz. 2. c. 5))
Marlborough House Settlement Act 1850 (repealed)	13 & 14 Vict. c. 78	14 August 1850
An Act to enable Her Majesty to make Provision for the Residence of His Royal Highness Albert Edward Prince of Wales in Marlborough House during the joint Lives of Her Majesty and His Royal Highness. (Repealed by Statute Law (Repeals) Act 1977 (c. 18))
Annual Turnpike Acts Continuance Act 1850 (repealed)	13 & 14 Vict. c. 79	14 August 1850
An Act to continue certain Turnpike Acts in Great Britain, and to make further Provisions respecting Turnpike Roads in England. (Repealed by Statute Law Revision Act 1894 (57 & 58 Vict. c. 56))
Repeal of Part of Palliser's Act for the Encouragement of Fisheries Act 1850 (repealed)	13 & 14 Vict. c. 80	14 August 1850
An Act to repeal Part of an Act of the Fifteenth Year of King George the Third, (Note: Newfoundland Fisheries Act 1775 (15 Geo. 3. c. 31)) for the Encouragement of the Fisheries carried on from Great Britain, Ireland, and the British Dominions in Europe, and for securing the Return of the Fishermen. Sailors, and others employed in the said Fisheries to the Porta thereof at the End of the Fishing Season. (Repealed by Statute Law Revision Act 1875 (38 & 39 Vict. c. 66))
Dublin Corporation Act 1850 (repealed)	13 & 14 Vict. c. 81	14 August 1850
An Act to explain an Act of the last Session for amending an Act for the Regulation of Municipal Corporations in Ireland so far as relates to the Borough of Dublin. (Repealed by Statute Law (Repeals) Act 2013 (c. 2))
Grand Jury Cess (Ireland) Act 1850 (repealed)	13 & 14 Vict. c. 82	14 August 1850
An Act to extend the Remedies for the Collection of Grand Jury Cess in Ireland. (Repealed by Local Government (Ireland) Act 1898 (61 & 62 Vict. c. 37))
Abandonment of Railways Act 1850 (repealed)	13 & 14 Vict. c. 83	14 August 1850
An Act to facilitate the Abandonment of Railways, and the Dissolution of Railway Companies, in certain cases. (Repealed by Transport Act 1962 (10 & 11 Eliz. 2. c. 46) and for Northern Ireland by Road Traffic, Transport and Roads (Northern Ireland) Order 1984 (SI 1984/1986 (N.I. 15)))
Customs (Manchester Bonding) Act 1850 (repealed)	13 & 14 Vict. c. 84	14 August 1850
An Act to enable the Council of the Borough of Manchester to determine their Liability to defray the Expenses of Customs in respect of Goods warehoused in the said Borough, and to authorize the Commissioners of Her Majesty's Treasury to direct the Discontinuance of the further warehousing of Goods in such Warehouses without Payment of Duty. (Repealed by Statute Law Revision Act 1894 (57 & 58 Vict. c. 56))
Assizes (Ireland) Act 1850 (repealed)	13 & 14 Vict. c. 85	14 August 1850
An Act to provide for holding the Assises of certain Counties of Cities and Towns in Ireland in the Assise Towns of the adjoining Counties at large, in certain Cases; and to make Provision as to Gaols in case of the Change of Assize Towns. (Repealed by Statute Law Revision Act 1875 (38 & 39 Vict. c. 66), Statute Law Revision Act 1891 (54 & 55 Vict. c. 67), Northern Ireland (Modification of Enactments—No. 1) Order 1973 (SI 1973/2163) and Administration of Justice (Northern Ireland) Order 1975 (SI 1975/816 (N.I. 7)))
National Gallery and Museums (Scotland) Act 1850 (repealed)	13 & 14 Vict. c. 86	14 August 1850
An Act for the Erection on the Earthen Mound in the City of Edinburgh of Buildings for a National Gallery, and other Purposes connected therewith and with the Promotion of the Fine Arts in Scotland. (Repealed by National Galleries of Scotland Act 1906 (6 Edw. 7 c. 50))
Police Superannuation Fund Act 1850 (repealed)	13 & 14 Vict. c. 87	14 August 1850
An Act for Payment of a Moiety of certain Penalties towards Police Superannuation Funds. (Repealed by Statute Law Revision Act 1875 (38 & 39 Vict. c. 66))
Fisheries (Ireland) Act 1850 (repealed)	13 & 14 Vict. c. 88	14 August 1850
An Act to amend the Law relating to Engines used in the Rivers and on the Sea Coasts of Ireland for the taking of Fish. (Repealed by Fisheries Act (Northern Ireland) 1966 (c. 17 (N.I.)))
Court of Chancery (Ireland) Regulation Act 1850 (repealed)	13 & 14 Vict. c. 89	14 August 1850
An Act to regulate the Proceedings in the High Court of Chancery in Ireland. (Repealed by Chancery (Ireland) Act 1867 (30 & 31 Vict. c. 44), Statute Law Revision Act 1875 (38 & 39 Vict. c. 66), Statute Law Revision Act 1891 (54 & 55 Vict. c. 67), Statute Law Revision Act 1892 (55 & 56 Vict. c. 19) and Statute Law Revision Act 1950 (14 Geo. 6. c. 6))
Public Health Supplemental Act 1850 (No. 2) or the Public Health Supplemental (No. 2) Act 1850	13 & 14 Vict. c. 90	14 August 1850
An Act to confirm certain Provisional Orders of the General Board of Health, and for certain other Purposes in relation to the Public Health Act, 1848. (Note: Public Health Act 1848 (11 & 12 Vict. c. 63))
	Wigan	
	Preston	
	Wolverhampton	
	Ashby de la Zouch	
	Sandgate	
	Swansea	
Borough Justices Act 1850 (repealed)	13 & 14 Vict. c. 91	14 August 1850
An Act to authorize Justices of any Borough having a separate Gaol to commit Assize Prisoners to such Gaol, and to extend the Jurisdiction of Borough Justices to all Offences and Matters arising within the Borough for which they act. (Repealed by Statute Law Revision Act 1891 (54 & 55 Vict. c. 67))
Cruelty to Animals (Scotland) Act 1850 (repealed)	13 & 14 Vict. c. 92	14 August 1850
An Act for the more effectual Prevention of Cruelty to Animals in Scotland. (Repealed by Protection of Animals (Scotland) Act 1912 (2 & 3 Geo. 5. c. 14))
Mercantile Marine Act 1850 (repealed)	13 & 14 Vict. c. 93	14 August 1850
An Act for improving the Condition of Masters, Mates, and Seamen, and maintaining Discipline, in the Merchant Service. (Repealed by Merchant Shipping Repeal Act 1854 (17 & 18 Vict. c. 120))
Ecclesiastical Commissioners Act 1850	13 & 14 Vict. c. 94	14 August 1850
An Act to amend the Acts relating to the Ecclesiastical Commissioners for England.
Customs Act 1850 (repealed)	13 & 14 Vict. c. 95	14 August 1850
An Act to amend the Laws relating to the Customs. (Repealed by Customs Consolidation Act 1853 (16 & 17 Vict. c. 107) and Merchant Shipping Repeal Act 1854 (17 & 18 Vict. c. 120) (Note: Incorrectly cited as "17 & 18 Vict. c. 102" in the Chronological Table of the Statutes.))
Assessed Taxes Composition Act 1850 (repealed)	13 & 14 Vict. c. 96	14 August 1850
An Act to continue and amend the Acts for authorizing a Composition for Assessed Taxes. (Repealed by Revenue Act 1869 (32 & 33 Vict. c. 14))
Stamp Duties Act 1850 (repealed)	13 & 14 Vict. c. 97	14 August 1850
An Act to repeal certain Stamp Duties, and to grant others in lieu thereof; and to amend the Laws relating to the Stamp Duties. (Repealed by Stamp Duties Management Act 1891 (54 & 55 Vict. c. 38))
Pluralities Act 1850 (repealed)	13 & 14 Vict. c. 98	14 August 1850
An Act to amend the Law relating to the holding of Benefices in Plurality. (Repealed by Church of England (Miscellaneous Provisions) Measure 1992 (No. 1))
Rating of Small Tenements Act 1850 (repealed)	13 & 14 Vict. c. 99	14 August 1850
An Act for the better assessing and collecting the Poor Rates and Highway Rates in respect of small Tenements. (Repealed by Statute Law Revision Act 1875 (38 & 39 Vict. c. 66))
Coal Mines Inspection Act 1850 (repealed)	13 & 14 Vict. c. 100	14 August 1850
An Act for Inspection of Coal Mines in Great Britain. (Repealed by Coal Mines Act 1855 (18 & 19 Vict. c. 108))
Poor Law Amendment Act 1850 (repealed)	13 & 14 Vict. c. 101	14 August 1850
An Act to continue Two Acts passed in the Twelfth (Note: Poor Law Amendment Act 1848 (11 & 12 Vict. c. 110)) and Thirteenth (Note: Poor Law Amendment Act 1849 (12 & 13 Vict. c. 103)) Years of the Reign of Her Majesty, for chaining the Maintenance of certain poor Persons in Unions in England and Wales upon the Common Fund; and to make certain Amendments in the Laws for the Relief of the Poor. (Repealed by Local Government Act 1948 (11 & 12 Geo. 6. c. 26))
Summary Jurisdiction (Ireland) Act 1850 (repealed)	13 & 14 Vict. c. 102	14 August 1850
An Act to consolidate and amend the Acts relating to certain Offences and other Matters as to which Justices of the Peace exercise a summary Jurisdiction in Ireland. (Repealed by Summary Jurisdiction (Ireland) Act 1851 (14 & 15 Vict. c. 92))
London Bridge Approaches Act 1850	13 & 14 Vict. c. 103	14 August 1850
An Act to authorize further Charges on "The London Bridge Approaches Fund" for the Completion of certain Improvements in the Metropolis.
Copyright of Designs Act 1850 or the Designs Act 1850 (repealed)	13 & 14 Vict. c. 104	14 August 1850
An Act to extend and amend the Acts relating to the Copyright of Designs. (Repealed by Patents, Designs, and Trade Marks Act 1883 (46 & 47 Vict. c. 57))
Liberties Act 1850 (repealed)	13 & 14 Vict. c. 105	14 August 1850
An Act for facilitating the Union of Liberties with the Counties in which they are situate. (Repealed by Local Authorities etc. (Miscellaneous Provision) (No. 4) Order 1974 (SI 1974/1351))
Crime and Outrage (Ireland) Act 1850 (repealed)	13 & 14 Vict. c. 106	14 August 1850
An Act to continue for a Time to be limited, an Act of the Eleventh Year of Her present Majesty, (Note: Prevention of Crime (Ireland) Act 1848 (11 & 12 Vict. c. 2)) for the better Prevention of Crime and Outrage in certain Parts of Ireland. (Repealed by Statute Law Revision Act 1875 (38 & 39 Vict. c. 66))
Appropriation Act 1850 (repealed)	13 & 14 Vict. c. 107	15 August 1850
An Act to apply a Sum out of the Consolidated Fund, and certain other Sums, to the Service of the Year One thousand eight hundred and fifty; and to appropriate the Supplies granted in this Session of Parliament. (Repealed by Statute Law Revision Act 1875 (38 & 39 Vict. c. 66))
Public Health Supplemental Act 1850 (No. 3) or the Public Health Supplemental (No. 3) Act 1850	13 & 14 Vict. c. 108	15 August 1850
An Act for confirming certain further Provisional Orders of the General Board of Health.
	Carlisle	
	Alnwick	
	Cardiff	
	Newcastle under Lyme	
	Exmouth	
	Darlington	
	Llanelly	
	Watford	
	Southampton	
	Berwick upon Tweed	
	Tewkesbury	
	Holbeach	
	Tormoham	
	Burslem	
Spitalfields Improvements Act 1850	13 & 14 Vict. c. 109	15 August 1850
An Act to enlarge and extend the Powers of an Act of the Ninth and Tenth Years of Her present Majesty, intituled "An Act to enable the Commissioners of Her Majesty's Woods to construct a new Street from Spitalfields to Shoreditch." (Note: New Street from Spitalfields to Shoreditch Act 1846 (9 & 10 Vict. c. 34))
Savings Banks (Ireland) Act 1850 (repealed)	13 & 14 Vict. c. 110	15 August 1850
An Act to continue the Act (Note: Savings Banks (Ireland) Act 1848 (11 & 12 Vict. c. 133)) for amending the Laws relating to Savings Banks in Ireland. (Repealed by Statute Law Revision Act 1875 (38 & 39 Vict. c. 66))
Holyhead Harbour Act 1850 (repealed)	13 & 14 Vict. c. 111	15 August 1850
An Act to relieve the Chester and Holyhead Railway Company from contributing towards the Expense of the proposed new Harbour at Holyhead, and to take away the Powers of the said Company in relation to such Harbour. (Repealed by Statute Law Revision Act 1894 (57 & 58 Vict. c. 56))
Lough Corrib Act 1850	13 & 14 Vict. c. 112	15 August 1850
An Act to vest in the Commissioners of Public Works in Ireland certain Works and Rights of the Lough Corrib Improvement Company, and to compensate such Company for the same.
Improvement of Land (Ireland) Act 1850 (repealed)	13 & 14 Vict. c. 113	15 August 1850
An Act to authorise the Transfer of Loans for the Improvement of Land in Ireland to other Land. (Repealed by Statute Law Revision Act 1875 (38 & 39 Vict. c. 66))
Stamp Duties (Ireland) Act 1850 (repealed)	13 & 14 Vict. c. 114	15 August 1850
An Act to repeal the Stamp Duties on Proceedings in the Courts of Law in Ireland, and to grant certain other Stamp Duties in lieu thereof. (Repealed by Statute Law Revision Act 1892 (55 & 56 Vict. c. 19))
Friendly Societies Act 1850 (repealed)	13 & 14 Vict. c. 115	15 August 1850
An Act to consolidate and amend the Laws relating to Friendly Societies. (Repealed by Friendly Societies Act 1855 (18 & 19 Vict. c. 63))
Portland Harbour Act 1850	13 & 14 Vict. c. 116	15 August 1850
An Act to amend an Act passed in the Tenth Year of Her present Majesty's Reign, (Note: Portland Breakwater Act 1847 (10 & 11 Vict. c. 24)) for empowering the Commissioners of Her Majesty's Woods to purchase Land for a Harbour of Refuge and Breakwater in the Isle of Portland; and to make further Provisions for the Division and Application of the Purchase Money.

=== Local acts ===
Short title	Citation	Royal assent
Long title
Suffolk Alliance Life and Fire Assurance Company Act 1850 (repealed)	13 & 14 Vict. c. i	17 May 1850
An Act for carrying into effect an Agreement entered into between "The Suffolk and General Country Amicable Insurance Office" and "The Alliance British and Foreign Life and Fire Assurance Company." (Repealed by Alliance Assurance Company's Act 1886 (49 & 50 Vict. c. lxxiv))
Bristol Waterworks Amendment Act 1850 (repealed)	13 & 14 Vict. c. ii	17 May 1850
An Act to authorize the Bristol Waterworks Company to raise a further Sum of Money. (Repealed by Bristol Waterworks Act 1862 (25 & 26 Vict. c. xxx))
Birkenhead Improvement Amendment Act 1850 (repealed)	13 & 14 Vict. c. iii	17 May 1850
An Act to give further Powers to the Birkenhead Improvement Commissioners for purchasing the Woodside Ferry, and for regulating their Mortgage Debt and facilitating the Sale of their Lands at Birkenhead. (Repealed by Birkenhead Corporation Act 1881 (44 & 45 Vict. c. cliii))
West Bromwich Rates Act 1850 (repealed)	13 & 14 Vict. c. iv	17 May 1850
An Act for better assessing and collecting the Poor's Rates, Highway Rates, the County, Shirehall, Police, and other County Bates in the Parish of West Bromwich in the County of Stafford, and the Township of Oldbury in the Parish of Hales Owen in the County of Worcester, and which Parish of West Bromwich and Township of Oldbury are situate within the West Bromwich Poor Law Union. (Repealed by Statute Law (Repeals) Act 2008 (c. 12))
Brighton Royal Pavilion Act 1850 or the Brighton Improvement (Purchase of the Royal Pavilion and Grounds) Act 1850 (repealed)	13 & 14 Vict. c. v	17 May 1850
An Act to enable the Commissioners acting under an Act passed in the Sixth Year of the Reign of His late Majesty King George the Fourth, (Note: Brighthelmston Improvement and Poor Relief Act 1825 (6 Geo. 4. c. clxxix)) for better regulating, paving, improving, and managing the Town of Brighthelmston (Note: Brighthelmstone is now known as Brighton.) in the County of Sussex, and the Poor thereof, to purchase, improve, and manage the Royal Pavilion at Brighton, and the Grounds thereof, and to enlarge, extend, and apply the Powers and Provisions of the same Act with reference thereto. (Repealed by Brighton Corporation Act 1931 (21 & 22 Geo. 5. c. cix))
Buckinghamshire Railways Act 1850	13 & 14 Vict. c. vi	17 May 1850
An Act to authorize an Alteration in the Line of the Buckinghamshire Railways at Oxford.
South Wales Railway Extension of Time Act 1850	13 & 14 Vict. c. vii	17 May 1850
An Act to extend the Time for the Purchase of certain Lands required for the South Wales Railway, and to amend the Acts relating thereto.
Wakefield Borough Market Amendment Act 1850	13 & 14 Vict. c. viii	17 May 1850
An Act to authorize the Wakefield Borough Market Company to purchase certain Lands for a Market Place, and to make Approaches thereto.
Clerical, Medical and General Life Assurance Act 1850 (repealed)	13 & 14 Vict. c. ix	17 May 1850
An Act for better enabling the Clerical, Medical, and General Life Assurance Society to sue and be sued; and to alter certain Provisions of their Deed of Constitution; and to give further Powers to the Society. (Repealed by Clerical, Medical and General Life Assurance Act 1974 (c. xi))
British Assurance Company's Act 1850	13 & 14 Vict. c. x	17 May 1850
An Act to change the Name of "The Architects, Civil Engineers, Builders, and General Fire and Life Insurance, Annuity, and Reversionary Interest Company;" and for other Purposes relating to the Company.
Dublin and Belfast Junction Railway Amendment Act 1850	13 & 14 Vict. c. xi	17 May 1850
An Act to extend the Time for the Purchase of Lands required for the Completion of the Dublin and Belfast Junction Railway, and to amend the Acts relating to such Railway.
Ramsey, Upwood and Great Raveley Drainage Act 1850	13 & 14 Vict. c. xii	17 May 1850
An Act for the more effectual Drainage and Improvement of certain Lands in the Parishes of Ramsey, Upwood, and Great Raveley, all in the County of Huntingdon.
Glasgow and Shott's Road Improvement Act 1850	13 & 14 Vict. c. xiii	17 May 1850
An Act for improving the Glasgow and Shotts Turnpike Roads.
Londonderry and Enniskillen Railway Amendment Act 1850 (repealed)	13 & 14 Vict. c. xiv	31 May 1850
An Act to enable the Londonderry and Enniskillen Railway Company to extend their Line of Railway from Strabane to Omagh; and to amend the Acts relating to the said Company. (Repealed by Londonderry and Enniskillen Railway Consolidation Act 1852 (15 & 16 Vict. c. xliv))
Walsall Improvement and Market Amendment Act 1850 (repealed)	13 & 14 Vict. c. xv	31 May 1850
An Act to amend the Walsall Improvement and Market Act, 1848, (Note: Walsall Improvement and Market Act 1848 (11 & 12 Vict. c. clxi)) and for other Purposes. (Repealed by Walsall Corporation Act 1969 (c. lviii))
Kew and Petersham Parishes Act 1850	13 & 14 Vict. c. xvi	31 May 1850
An Act for extinguishing the Vicarial Tithes in the Parishes of Kew and Petersham in the County of Surrey; for confirming and regulating the Pew Rents of the Churches of the said Parishes; for authorizing the Division of the Vicarage of Kew and Petersham; and for other Purposes relating to such Vicarage.
Londonderry and Coleraine Railway Amendment Act 1850 (repealed)	13 & 14 Vict. c. xvii	31 May 1850
An Act for completing the Line of the Londonderry and Coleraine Railway, with Branch to Newtownlimavady, and for amending the Acts relating thereto. (Repealed by Londonderry and Coleraine Railway Consolidation Act 1852 (15 & 16 Vict. c. xliii))
Monarch Fire and Life Assurance Company Act 1850	13 & 14 Vict. c. xviii	10 June 1850
An Act to change the Name of the Licensed Victuallers and General Fire and Life Assurance Company to the Monarch Fire and Life Assurance Company, and for better enabling the said Company to sue and be sued; and to give additional Powers to the said Company.
Carlisle Gas Act 1850	13 & 14 Vict. c. xix	10 June 1850
An Act to authorize a Transfer of the Undertaking and Powers of "The Carlisle Gaslight and Coke Company" to the Major, Aldermen, and Citizens of the City of Carlisle; to enable them to light the said City and the Environs thereof, and to raise Money for such Purposes; to repeal or amend and extend the Powers of the several Acts for lighting the said City and Environs; and for other Purposes.
Faculty of Physicians and Surgeons of Glasgow Act 1850	13 & 14 Vict. c. xx	10 June 1850
An Act for better regulating the Privileges of the Faculty of Physicians and Surgeons of Glasgow, and amending their Charter of Incorporation.
Colonization Assurance Corporation Act 1850	13 & 14 Vict. c. xxi	10 June 1850
An Act for incorporating the Colonization Assurance Company, and conferring certain Privileges on the said Company.
Elgin Guildry Fund Society Act 1850	13 & 14 Vict. c. xxii	10 June 1850
An Act to incorporate the Society of the Guildry Fund of Elgin; to enable the said Society to sue and be sued; to regulate the said Society; and for other Purposes relating thereto.
Royal College of Surgeons of Edinburgh Act 1850	13 & 14 Vict. c. xxiii	10 June 1850
An Act for enabling Her Majesty to grant a new Charter to the Royal College of Surgeons of Edinburgh, and for conferring further Powers on the said College.
Exeter and Crediton Railway Amendment Act 1850	13 & 14 Vict. c. xxiv	10 June 1850
An Act to enable the Exeter and Crediton Railway Company to enlarge their Cowley Bridge Station, and to raise a further Amount of Capital.
Guardian Assurance Company's Act 1850	13 & 14 Vict. c. xxv	25 June 1850
An Act for better enabling the Guardian Fire and Life Assurance Company to sue and be sued, and to alter certain Provisions of their Deed of Settlement, and to give further Powers to the Company.
Shrewsbury and Hereford Railway Amendment Act 1850	13 & 14 Vict. c. xxvi	25 June 1850
An Act to amend the Act (Note: Shrewsbury and Hereford Railway Act 1846 (9 & 10 Vict. c. cccxxv)) relating to the Shrewsbury and Hereford Railway Company.
Forth and Clyde Navigation Amendment Act 1850	13 & 14 Vict. c. xxvii	25 June 1850
An Act to extend the Time for the Sale of such Lands belonging to the Company of Proprietors of the Forth and Clyde Navigation as may not be required for the Purposes of the said Navigation, and to amend the Acts relating thereto.
Childwall Waterworks Act 1850	13 & 14 Vict. c. xxviii	25 June 1850
An Act for better supplying Childwall, Thingwall, Little Woolton, Much Woolton, and Gateacre, all in the County of Lancaster, with Water.
Waterford and Limerick Railway Amendment Act 1850	13 & 14 Vict. c. xxix	25 June 1850
An Act to amend the Acts relating to the Waterford and Limerick Railway, and for other Purposes.
London and Blackwall Railway Act 1850	13 & 14 Vict. c. xxx	25 June 1850
An Act for granting Facilities for the Use of certain Portions of the Eastern Counties Railways by the London and Blackwall Railway Company; and for amending the Acts relating to the London and Blackwall Railway.
South Eastern Railway (Increase of Capital) Act 1850	13 & 14 Vict. c. xxxi	25 June 1850
An Act to enable the South-eastern Railway Company to raise a further Sum of Money.
New North Road Amendment Act 1850 or the Marylebone and Finchley Turnpikes Extension Act 1850	13 & 14 Vict. c. xxxii	25 June 1850
An Act to explain and amend the New North Road Act, 1849. (Note: New North Road Act 1849 (12 & 13 Vict. c. lxvi))
Railway Clearing Act 1850 (repealed)	13 & 14 Vict. c. xxxiii	25 June 1850
An Act to incorporate the Committee of Railway Companies associated under the Railway Clearing System and to enlarge the powers vested in that Committee, and for other purposes. (Repealed by Railway Clearing House Scheme Order 1954 (SI 1954/139))
Dumfries and Maxwelltown Waterworks Act 1850	13 & 14 Vict. c. xxxiv	25 June 1850
An Act for supplying the Burghs of Dumfries and Maxwelltown and Suburbs with Water.
South Yorkshire, Doncaster and Goole Railway (Deviation and Extension of Elsecar Branch) Act 1850	13 & 14 Vict. c. xxxv	15 July 1850
An Act to authorize Deviations in the Line of the South Yorkshire, Doncaster, and Goole Railway, the Extension of the Elsecar Branch of the said Railway to Tankersley, and the Amendment of the Acts relating to the said Railway.
East and West India Docks and Birmingham Junction Railway Branches and Amendment Act 1850	13 & 14 Vict. c. xxxvi	15 July 1850
An Act to enable the East and West India Docks and Birmingham Junction Railway Company to make certain Branch Railways, and to amend the Act (Note: East and West India Docks and Birmingham Junction Railway Act 1846 (9 & 10 Vict. c. cccxcvi)) relating to the said Company, and to authorize the Lease of the said Undertaking, and for other Purposes.
Cambridge Corporation Act 1850 (repealed)	13 & 14 Vict. c. xxxvii	15 July 1850
An Act for regulating the Markets and Fairs held within the Borough of Cambridge, and at Reach in the County of Cambridge, and for enlarging the Market Place, and for rebuilding or altering the Guildhall of the said Borough, and for the Improvement of the said Borough, and the better Regulation of the Police within the same. (Repealed by Cambridge City Council Act 1985 (c. xl))
York and North Midland Railway Act 1850	13 & 14 Vict. c. xxxviii	15 July 1850
An Act to alter the Terms of Issue of the Shares in the Capital of the York and North Midland Railway Company, called the "Hull and Selby Purchase, &c. Shares;" to enable the said Company to hold Shares in the Hull and Selby Railway Company and in the Malton and Driffield Junction Railway Company; to alter, amend, and extend the Acts relating to the York and North Midland Railway Company; and for other Purposes.
Dundee and Perth and Aberdeen Railway Junction (Additional Capital) Act 1850	13 & 14 Vict. c. xxxix	15 July 1850
An Act to enable the Dundee and Perth and Aberdeen Railway Junction Company to raise a further Sum of Money, and for other Purposes.
Borough of Bolton Act 1850 (repealed)	13 & 14 Vict. c. xl	15 July 1850
An Act for establishing Markets in and otherwise improving the Borough of Bolton in the County Palatine of Lancaster, and for extending the Provisions of the Acts relating to the Bolton Waterworks, and for other Purposes. (Repealed by Bolton Improvement Act 1854 (17 & 18 Vict. c. clix))
Swansea Corporation Act 1850 (repealed)	13 & 14 Vict. c. xli	15 July 1850
An Act to enable the Corporation of Swansea, with the Consent of the Lords Commissioners of Her Majesty's Treasury, to subscribe for Shares in the Swansea Dock Company, and to raise Money for that Purpose, and to purchase the Interests of certain Lessees of Property belonging to the said Corporation; and for other Purposes. (Repealed by Swansea Harbour Act 1857 (20 & 21 Vict. c. cxlii))
Reading Cattle Market Act 1850 (repealed)	13 & 14 Vict. c. xlii	15 July 1850
An Act for providing, regulating, and maintaining a Cattle Market in the Borough of Reading in the County of Berks, and for constructing a convenient Market Place therein. (Repealed by Berkshire Act 1986 (c. ii))
Montrose Harbour Act 1850	13 & 14 Vict. c. xliii	15 July 1850
An Act to amend the Act (Note: Montrose Harbour Act 1837 (7 Will. 4 & 1 Vict. c. xcix)) relating to the Harbour of Montrose, and to enable the Trustees to borrow a further Sum of Money.
South Wales Railway (Capital) Act 1850 (repealed)	13 & 14 Vict. c. xliv	15 July 1850
An Act to grant further Powers to the South Wales Railway Company with reference to the Creation of Shares and the Regulation of their Capital; and for other Purposes. (Repealed by South Wales Railway Consolidation Act 1855 (18 & 19 Vict. c. xcviii))
Dublin and Drogheda Railway Act 1850	13 & 14 Vict. c. xlv	15 July 1850
An Act to grant further Powers to the Dublin and Drogheda Railway Company for raising Money by the Creation of Shares, in lieu of borrowing on Mortgage; and to amend the Acts relating to the Dublin and Drogheda Railway.
Stourbridge Union Rates Act 1850 (repealed)	13 & 14 Vict. c. xlvi	15 July 1850
An Act for belter assessing and collecting the Poor Rates; Highway Rates, and other Parochial Rates, the County, Shirehall, Police, and other County and local Rates, on Small Tenements in the several Parishes, Townships, and Hamlets of Stourbridge, Upper Swinford, Wollaston, the Lye, Wollescote, Cradley, the Borough of Halesowen, Hawn, Hasbury, Illy, Lutley, the Hill, Cakesmore, Ridgacre, and Lapal, in the County of Worcester, and Kingswinford and Amblecote in the County of Stafford, situate within and forming the Stourbridge Poor Law Union. (Repealed by Statute Law (Repeals) Act 2008 (c. 12))
Swansea Dock Amendment Act 1850 (repealed)	13 & 14 Vict. c. xlvii	15 July 1850
An Act for extending the Times limited by "The Swansea Dock Act, 1847," (Note: Swansea Dock Act 1847 (10 & 11 Vict. c. cxxiii)) for the compulsory Purchase of Lands and Execution of Works; and for other Purposes. (Repealed by Swansea Harbour Act 1857 (20 & 21 Vict. c. cxlii))
Snaith and Cowick Township Act 1850	13 & 14 Vict. c. xlviii	15 July 1850
An Act for uniting the Townships of Snaith and Cowick in the Parish of Snaith in the West Riding of the County of York, and for other Parochial or Township Purposes.
Croydon and Reigate Turnpike Road Act 1850 (repealed)	13 & 14 Vict. c. xlix	15 July 1850
An Act for managing and repairing the Rood leading from Foxley Hatch in the Pariah of Croydon to the Town of Reigate in the County of Surrey. (Repealed by Statute Law (Repeals) Act 2013 (c. 2))
Pontypridd Gas Act 1850	13 & 14 Vict. c. l	15 July 1850
An Act for lighting with Gas the Town of Pontypridd and the Neighbourhood thereof in the County of Glamorgan.
Victoria (London) Dock Act 1850 (repealed)	13 & 14 Vict. c. li	15 July 1850
An Act to authorize the Construction of a Dock on the North Side of the River Thames, to be called "The Victoria London Dock." (Repealed by Victoria (London) Docks Act 1853 (16 & 17 Vict. c. cxxxi))
City of Norwich Waterworks Act 1850 (repealed)	13 & 14 Vict. c. lii	15 July 1850
An Act for supplying the City of Norwich and the Neighbourhood thereof with Water. (Repealed by Norwich City Council Act 1984 (c. xxiii))
Great North of England Railway Company's Purchase Amendment Act 1850	13 & 14 Vict. c. liii	15 July 1850
An Act to amend "The Great North of England Railway Purchase Act, 1846," (Note: Great North of England Railway Company's Purchase Act 1846 (9 & 10 Vict. c. ccxlii)) and to enable the York, Newcastle, and Berwick Railway Company to complete the Purchase of the said Railway.
Eastern Union Railway Amendment Act 1850	13 & 14 Vict. c. liv	15 July 1850
An Act for extending the Time and continuing the Powers granted by "The Eastern Union and Harwich Railway and Pier Act, 1847," (Note: Eastern Union and Harwich Railway and Pier Act 1847 (10 & 11 Vict. c. ccxxv)) for the compulsory Purchase of Lands and Houses, and for the Completion of Works, and for enabling "The Eastern Union Railway Company" to create new Shares, with certain Privileges attached, for paying off their Mortgage Debt; and for other Purposes.
North Staffordshire Railway (Newcastle Branch Extension of Time) Act 1850	13 & 14 Vict. c. lv	15 July 1850
An Act to extend the Time for the Purchase of Lands required for certain Branches of the North Staffordshire Railway to Newcastle-under-Lyme, Silverdale, and the Apedale Ironworks.
London (City) Improvement Act 1850	13 & 14 Vict. c. lvi	15 July 1850
An Act for making a new Street from the West Side of Queen Street to the South Side of Saint Paul's Churchyard, in continuation of the new Street from Cannon Street to the East Side of Queen Street, and for effecting other Improvements in the City of London.
South Yorkshire Railway and River Dun Company Act 1850	13 & 14 Vict. c. lvii	15 July 1850
An Act to authorize the abandoning of certain Portions of the South Yorkshire, Doncaster, and Goole Railway, a Deviation thereof near Doncaster, and the Amendment of the Acts relating thereto.
South Staffordshire Railway Leasing Act 1850	13 & 14 Vict. c. lviii	15 July 1850
An Act to enable the South Staffordshire Railway Company to lease their Undertaking; and for other Purposes.
Kent Waterworks Amendment Act 1850	13 & 14 Vict. c. lix	15 July 1850
An Act to enable the Company of Proprietors of the Kent Waterworks to raise a further Sum of Money; and to alter and amend the former Acts relating thereto.
Southampton Waterworks Amendment Act 1850	13 & 14 Vict. c. lx	15 July 1850
An Act for amending and extending the Powers and Provisions of the Act of the Seventh Year of the Reign of King William the Fourth, (Note: Southampton Waterworks Act 1836 (6 & 7 Will. 4. c. xcvi)) relating to the Southampton Waterworks, and for other Purposes.
Great Northern Railway and East Lincolnshire Railway Act 1850	13 & 14 Vict. c. lxi	15 July 1850
An Act to amend the Acts relating to the Great Northern Railway to authorise a Deviation at Doncaster and Two short Curves at Peterborough, and to alter the Tolls of the Great Northern and East Lincolnshire Railways.
Waterford and Kilkenny Railway Amendment Act 1850	13 & 14 Vict. c. lxii	15 July 1850
An Act to enable the Waterford and Kilkenny Railway Company to raise further Capital; and for other Purposes.
River Tyne Improvement Act 1850	13 & 14 Vict. c. lxiii	15 July 1850
An Act for the Improvement and Regulation of the River Tyne and the Navigation thereof, and for other Purposes.
Heronsyke and Eamont Bridge Turnpike Road Act 1850	13 & 14 Vict. c. lxiv	15 July 1850
An Act to amend an Act passed in the Fifty-fifth Year of the Reign of King George the Third, intituled "An Act for more effectually repairing the Road leading from Heronsyke to Kirkby in Kendal, and from thence through Shap to Eamont Bridge, in the County of Westmoreland, and for making a new Road from the said Road at a Place called Far Cross Bank near Kirkby in Kendal, to communicate with the intended Canal from Lancaster to Kirkby in Kendal, and to join the said Road at or near a Place called the Lound near Kirkby in Kendal aforesaid;" (Note: Heronsyke, Kendal and Eamont Bridge Road Act 1815 (55 Geo. 3. c. xxxvii)) and to continue the Term by the same Act granted.
Ulverstone, Millthorp and Lancaster Turnpike Road Act 1850	13 & 14 Vict. c. lxv	15 July 1850
An Act to amend an Act passed in the Fifty-eighth Year of the Reign of King George the Third, intituled "An Act for making and maintaining a Turnpike Road from the Turnpike Road leading from Ulverstone to Kendal into the Turnpike Road leading from Millthorp to Kendal, and a Continuation of the said Road from the last-mentioned Turnpike Road to join the Turnpike Road leading from Lancaster to Kendal," (Note: Ulverstone, Millthorpe and Carnforth Turnpike Road Act 1818 (58 Geo. 3. c. lxx)) and to continue the Term thereby granted.
Tewkesbury Severn Bridge and Roads Extension Act 1850	13 & 14 Vict. c. lxvi	15 July 1850
An Act for continuing the Term of an Act passed in the Fourth Year of the Reign of His late Majesty King George the Fourth, intituled "An Act for building a Bridge over the River Severn, at or near to the Mythe Hill within the Parish and near to the Town of Tewkesbury in the County of Gloucester, to the opposite Side of the said River in the Parish of Bushley in the County of Worcester, and for making convenient Roads and Avenues to communicate with such Bridge within the Counties of Gloucester and Worcester," (Note: Tewkesbury Severn Bridge and Roads Act 1823 (4 Geo. 4. c. ii)) and of another Act passed in the Seventh Year of the Reign of His said late Majesty King George the Fourth, intituled "An Act for altering, amending, and enlarging the Powers and Provisions of an Act relating to the Tewkesbury Severn Bridge and Roads," (Note: Tewkesbury Severn Bridge and Roads Act 1826 (7 Geo. 4. c. lxi)) for the Purpose of paying off the Debt now due on the said Bridge and Roads.
Merionethshire Turnpike Roads Act 1850	13 & 14 Vict. c. lxvii	15 July 1850
An Act for continuing and enlarging the Term and Powers of Three Acts, passed in the Reign of His Majesty King George the Third, (Note: Merioneth, Montgomery, Denbigh and Salop Roads Act 1777 (17 Geo. 3. c. 100)) (Note: Bala and Dolgelly Roads Act 1796 (36 Geo. 3. c. 147)) (Note: Roads in Merioneth, Montgomery, Denbigh and Salop Act 1819 (59 Geo. 3. c. xcviii)) for repairing and widening several Roads leading to and from the Towns of Bala and Dolgelley in the County of Merioneth, and other Roads therein mentioned, in the Counties of Montgomery, Denbigh, and Salop, and for repairing several other Roads in the Counties of Merioneth and Denbigh.
Reading Union Waterworks Act 1850	13 & 14 Vict. c. lxviii	15 July 1850
An Act for the better supplying with Water the Town of Reading and the Hamlet of Whitley in the County of Berks.
Cardiff Waterworks Act 1850	13 & 14 Vict. c. lxix	15 July 1850
An Act for supplying with Water the Town and Port of Cardiff and the Neighbourhood thereof, in the County of Glamorgan.
Edinburgh Slaughterhouses Act 1850 (repealed)	13 & 14 Vict. c. lxx	15 July 1850
An Act to provide for the Erection of public Slaughterhouses for the City of Edinburgh, and for the Regulation of the same. (Repealed by Edinburgh Corporation Order Confirmation Act 1933 (24 & 25 Geo. 5. c. v))
Garstang and Heiring Syke Turnpike Road Act 1850	13 & 14 Vict. c. lxxi	15 July 1850
An Act to amend and extend the Provisions of the Act (Note: Road from Garstang to Lancaster and Heiring Syke Act 1823 (4 Geo. 4. c. xxiv)) relating to the Garstang and Heiring Syke Turnpike Road.
Newcastle-upon-Tyne and Carlisle Railway Act 1850	13 & 14 Vict. c. lxxii	29 July 1850
An Act to extend the Powers of the Newcastle-upon-Tyne and Carlisle Railway Company, and to amend Acts relating to their Railway.
Shipwrecked Fishermen and Mariners Royal Benevolent Society's Act 1850	13 & 14 Vict. c. lxxiii	29 July 1850
An Act to incorporate the Members of the Shipwrecked Fishermen and Mariners Royal Benevolent Society, and to enable them better to carry into effect their charitable Designs.
Wolverhampton Waterworks Amendment Act 1850	13 & 14 Vict. c. lxxiv	29 July 1850
An Act to extend the Wolverhampton Waterworks, and to amend the Act (Note: Wolverhampton Waterworks Act 1845 (8 & 9 Vict. c. cxxxv)) relating thereto.
Salford Waterworks and Improvement Act 1850	13 & 14 Vict. c. lxxv	29 July 1850
An Act for better supplying with Water the Borough of Salford, and for the further Improvement of the said Borough.
Dundalk and Enniskillen Railway Act 1850	13 & 14 Vict. c. lxxvi	29 July 1850
An Act to extend the Powers of the Dundalk and Enniskillen Railway Company for the Purchase of Lands and Completion of Works on Part of their Railway; and for other Purposes.
Newcastle-upon-Tyne Improvement Act 1850 (repealed)	13 & 14 Vict. c. lxxvii	29 July 1850
An Act for extending and amending the Acts for regulating and improving the Borough of Newcastle-upon-Tyne. (Repealed by Tyne and Wear Act 1980 (c. xliii))
Aberdeen Railway Act 1850	13 & 14 Vict. c. lxxviii	29 July 1850
An Act for enabling the Aberdeen Railway Company to raise a further Sum of Money, and to alter their Station and the Levy of their Railway at and near Aberdeen; for repealing "The Great North of Scotland Railway Act, 1847;" (Note: Great North of Scotland Railway Act 1847 (10 & 11 Vict. c. cxcv)) for altering, amending, and extending the Acts relating to the Aberdeen Railway; and for other Purposes.
Bradford Improvement Act 1850 (repealed)	13 & 14 Vict. c. lxxix	29 July 1850
An Act for repealing an Act (Note: Little Horton Improvement Act 1803 (43 Geo. 3. c. xc)) relating to the Borough of Bradford in the County of York, and for better paving, lighting, watching, draining, and otherwise improving the said Borough, and for the better Regulation and Management thereof. (Repealed by West Yorkshire Act 1980 (c. xiv))
Liverpool Corporation Waterworks (Amendment) Act 1850 (repealed)	13 & 14 Vict. c. lxxx	29 July 1850
An Act to extend the Time limited by the Liverpool Corporation Waterworks Act, 1847, (Note: Liverpool Corporation Waterworks Act 1847 (10 & 11 Vict. c. cclxi)) for purchasing Lands and constructing the Works authorized by such Act, and for other Purposes. (Repealed by Liverpool Corporation Act 1921 (11 & 12 Geo. 5. c. lxxiv))
Cromford and Newhaven Turnpike Road Continuation Act 1850	13 & 14 Vict. c. lxxxi	29 July 1850
An Act for continuing the Term of the Cromford and Newhaven Turnpike Road Act, (Note: Cromford and Newhaven Turnpike Road Act 1825 (6 Geo. 4. c. lxxxix)) and for other Purposes.
Commercial Gas Company Poplar Gaslight Purchase Act 1850	13 & 14 Vict. c. lxxxii	29 July 1850
An Act for confirming an Agreement for the Sale of the Freehold and, Leasehold Hereditaments and Premises, Works, Property, Gear, and Fixtures, of the Poplar Gaslight Company, to the Commercial Gas Company, and for the Dissolution of the Poplar Gaslight Company.
Lancashire and Yorkshire Railway Act 1850	13 & 14 Vict. c. lxxxiii	29 July 1850
An Act to enlarge the Powers of the Lancashire and Yorkshire Railway Company, and to amend the Acts relating to their Undertakings.
Godstone and Highgate Turnpike Trust Liquidation of Debt Act 1850 (repealed)	13 & 14 Vict. c. lxxxiv	29 July 1850
An Act for continuing the Godstone and Highgate Turnpike Trust for a limited Period, for the Purpose of paying off the Mortgage Debt. (Repealed by Statute Law (Repeals) Act 2013 (c. 2))
Surrey and Sussex Roads Act 1850 (repealed)	13 & 14 Vict. c. lxxxv	29 July 1850
An Act for repairing the Road leading from a certain Point in the Kennington Road in the Parish of Saint Mary Lambeth in the County of Surrey to Highgate in the County of Sussex, and thence to Witchcross in the same County, and several other Roads therein mentioned. (Repealed by Statute Law (Repeals) Act 2013 (c. 2))
British Electric Telegraph Company's Act 1850 (repealed)	13 & 14 Vict. c. lxxxvi	29 July 1850
An Act for forming and regulating the British Electric Telegraph Company, and to enable the said Company to work certain Letters Patent. (Repealed by British Electric Telegraph Company's Act 1853 (16 & 17 Vict. c. clix))
Rochdale and Bury Turnpike Road Act 1850	13 & 14 Vict. c. lxxxvii	29 July 1850
An Act for more effectually repairing and improving the Road from Rochdale,^ through Bamford and Birtle, to Bury, and several other Roads therein mentioned, all in the County Palatine of Lancaster.
Midland Great Western Railway of Ireland (Deviations and Amendment) Act 1850 (repealed)	13 & 14 Vict. c. lxxxviii	29 July 1850
An Act to enable the Midland Great Western Railway of Ireland Company to make certain Deviations in the Line of their Railway; and for other Purposes. (Repealed by Statute Law (Repeals) Act 2013 (c. 2))
Timber Preserving Company's Amendment Act 1850	13 & 14 Vict. c. lxxxix	29 July 1850
An Act for extending and amending the Powers of the Timber Preserving Company's Acts; and to enable the Company to buy, improve, and sell Substances to be preserved, and to work Mills and Machinery.
Birmingham and Pershore Turnpike Road Continuation Act 1850	13 & 14 Vict. c. xc	5 August 1850
An Act for continuing the Term of "The Birmingham and Pershore Turnpike Road Act," (Note: Birmingham and Pershore Turnpike Road Act 1825 (6 Geo. 4. c. cxlii)) and for other Purposes.
South Portland Street Suspension Bridge Act 1850 (repealed)	13 & 14 Vict. c. xci	5 August 1850
An Act for constructing a Bridge across the River Clyde, opposite to South Portland Street, Laurieston, Glasgow. (Repealed by Glasgow Bridges Consolidation Act 1866 (29 & 30 Vict. c. cccxxvii))
Gorbals Gravitation Water Company Act 1850	13 & 14 Vict. c. xcii	5 August 1850
An Act to amend "The Gorbals Gravitation Water Company Act, 1846," (Note: Gorbals Gravitation Water Company Act 1846 (9 & 10 Vict. c. cccxlvii)) to authorize the Extension of the Works, and the Construction of new Works to supply the Town or Royal Burgh of Rutherglen and other Places with Water.
Peterborough Improvement and Cemetery Act 1850	13 & 14 Vict. c. xciii	5 August 1850
An Act for better paving, lighting, watching, cleansing, and otherwise regulating and improving the City and Township of Peterborough in the Liberty of Peterborough in the County of Northampton, and for establishing a Cemetery therein.
Manchester, Sheffield and Lincolnshire Railway Act 1850	13 & 14 Vict. c. xciv	5 August 1850
An Act to make better Provision for raising Funds to complete the Railway and Dock Undertakings of the Manchester, Sheffield, and Lincolnshire Railway Company, and for other Purposes.
Liverpool, Crosby and Southport Railway Amendment Act 1850	13 & 14 Vict. c. xcv	5 August 1850
An Act to authorize certain Alterations in the Line of the Liverpool, Crosby, and Southport Railway, and for other Purposes.
Bilston Improvement Act 1850	13 & 14 Vict. c. xcvi	14 August 1850
An Act for paving, draining, cleansing, lighting, and otherwise improving the Township of Bilston in the County of Stafford, and for establishing a Local Board of Health in that Township; and also for better supplying with Water and Gas the said Township of Bilston, and for constructing Cemeteries there, and for purchasing, improving, maintaining, and regulating the Market and Market Place therein; and for other Purposes.
East of Fife Railway Dissolution Act 1850	13 & 14 Vict. c. xcvii	14 August 1850
An Act for the Dissolution of the East of Fife Railway Company, and for the Abandonment of the Railway.
West Cornwall Railway Amendment Act 1850	13 & 14 Vict. c. xcviii	14 August 1850
An Act to enable the West Cornwall Railway Company to make a Deviation in and a Branch Railway from their authorized Line of Railway; and for other Purposes.
Liverpool, Crosby and Southport Railway (Sale or Lease) Act 1850	13 & 14 Vict. c. xcix	14 August 1850
An Act to enable the Liverpool, Crosby, and Southport Railway Company to sell or lease their Railway to the Lancashire and Yorkshire Railway Company.
Birkenhead Dock Trustees Act 1850 (repealed)	13 & 14 Vict. c. c	14 August 1850
An Act to carry into effect Arrangements made between the Commissioners of Her Majesty's Woods and the Trustees of the Birkenhead Docks; to amend the Acts relating to the said Docks, and to extend the Time for Completion of Works; and for other Purposes. (Repealed by Mersey Dock Acts Consolidation Act 1858 (21 & 22 Vict. c. xcii))
Glasgow Markets and Slaughter-Houses Act 1850 (repealed)	13 & 14 Vict. c. ci	14 August 1850
An Act for the Extension and better Regulation and Management of the Markets and Slaughter-houses in City of Glasgow. (Repealed by Glasgow Markets and Slaughterhouses Act 1865 (28 & 29 Vict. c. lxiii))
Westminster Improvement Act 1850	13 & 14 Vict. c. cii	14 August 1850
An Act for amending and enlarging the Powers and Provisions of "The Westminster Improvement Act, 1845," (Note: Westminster Improvement Act 1845 (8 & 9 Vict. c. clxxviii)) and "The Westminster Improvement Act, 1847," (Note: Westminster Improvement Act 1847 (10 & 11 Vict. c. cxxxi)) to extend the Time for the compulsory Purchase of Lands, and for other Purposes.
Marylebone and Finchley Turnpike Roads Extension Act 1850	13 & 14 Vict. c. ciii	14 August 1850
An Act for continuing the Term of an Act passed in the Seventh Year of the Reign of His Majesty King George the Fourth, intituled "An Act for making a Turnpike Road from Saint John's Chapel in the Parish of Saint Marylebone to the North-east End of Ballard's Lane, abutting upon the North Road in the Parish of Finchley, with a Branch therefrom, in the County of Middlesex," (Note: St. Marylebone and Finchley Turnpike Road and Branch Act 1826 (7 Geo. 4. c. xc)) for the Purpose of paying off the Debt now due on the said Roads, and providing for the future Management thereof.
St. Michael's Church, Chester Square, London Act 1850	13 & 14 Vict. c. civ	14 August 1850
An Act for better constituting the District Church of Saint Michael, Chester Square, in the County of Middlesex.
Wolverhampton Improvement Act 1850 (repealed)	13 & 14 Vict. c. cv	14 August 1850
An Act to give Effect to certain Securities upon the Rates authorized to be levied under the Wolverhampton Improvement Act. (Note: Wolverhampton Improvement and Markets Act 1814 (54 Geo. 3. c. 106)) (Repealed by Wolverhampton Improvement Act 1869 (32 & 33 Vict. c. cxxxi))
Class A Shareholders of the St. Andrews and Quebec Railroad Company Act 1850	13 & 14 Vict. c. cvi	14 August 1850
An Act for incorporating "The Class A. Shareholders of the St. Andrew's and Quebec Railroad Company," and conferring on them certain Powers.
St. Gabriel Pimlico Church Act 1850	13 & 14 Vict. c. cvii	14 August 1850
An Act for facilitating the Erection of a Church to be called "St. Gabriels" in the District Parish of St. Peter Pimlico in the County of Middlesex, and for other Purposes.
Belfast Improvement Act 1850	13 & 14 Vict. c. cviii	14 August 1850
An Act for better improving the Borough of Belfast.
Lee Navigation Improvement Act 1850	13 & 14 Vict. c. cix	14 August 1850
An Act to alter and amend the Acts relating to the Navigation of the River Lee in the Counties of Hertford, Essex, and Middlesex; and to enable the Trustees further to improve the Navigation and to dispose of the surplus Water; and for other Purposes.
Oxford, Worcester and Wolverhampton Railway (Amendment) Act 1850	13 & 14 Vict. c. cx	14 August 1850
An Act to amend the Acts relating to the Oxford, Worcester, and Wolverhampton Railway company, and to confer additional Powers upon the same Company and upon certain other Companies, and for other Purposes.
Hartlepool West Harbour and Dock Act 1850	13 & 14 Vict. c. cxi	14 August 1850
An Act to enable the Hartlepool West Harbour and Dock Company to alter and improve their Harbour and construct additional Works; and for amending an Act passed in the Tenth Year of the Reign of Her present Majesty, called "The Hartlepool West Harbour and Dock Act, 1847." (Note: Hartlepool West Harbour and Dock Act 1847 (10 & 11 Vict. c. xvi))
Westminster Bridge Act 1850 (repealed)	13 & 14 Vict. c. cxii	14 August 1850
An Act to enable the Commissioners of Westminster Bridge to build a temporary Bridge across the River Thames from Bridge Street in the City of Westminster to the opposite Shore in the County of Surrey. (Repealed by Westminster Bridge Act 1853 (16 & 17 Vict. c. 46))

=== Private acts ===
Short title	Citation	Royal assent
Long title
Nottingham Freemen's Allotments Act 1850 (repealed)	13 & 14 Vict. c. 1 Pr.	10 June 1850
An Act for the Management of the Allotments made to the Freemen of Nottingham by virtue of certain Acts for inclosing Lands in the Parish of Saint Mary in the Town and County of the Town of Nottingham. (Repealed by Nottingham Corporation Act 1882 (45 & 46 Vict. c. ccxvii))
Brigstocke's (or Player's) Estate Act 1850	13 & 14 Vict. c. 2 Pr.	15 July 1850
An Act to authorize the granting of Building and Improvement Leases of the settled Estates of Elizabeth Lydia Brigstocke, situate in the Town of Ryde in the Isle of Wight.
Prussian Legation Act 1850 or the Prussian Minister's Residence Act 1850	13 & 14 Vict. c. 3 Pr.	15 July 1850
An Act to authorize the Purchase by the Prussian Minister of a Residence in England (Note: 9 Carlton House Terrace.) for the Use of the Prussian Legation, and to regulate the future holding of the same.
Cathrow's Estate Act 1850	13 & 14 Vict. c. 4 Pr.	15 July 1850
An Act to authorize the Sale of certain Real Estates situate at Hoddesdon in the County of Hertford, and in the Parish of Saint James Westminster in the County of Middlesex, and in Tottenham Court Road in the said County of Middlesex, which belonged to the late Renè Briand deceased.
Sir Hesketh Fleetwood's Estate Act 1850	13 & 14 Vict. c. 5 Pr.	15 July 1850
An Act for authorizing certain Agreements between the Chancellor and Council of Her Majesty's Duchy of Lancaster and Sir Peter Hesketh Fleetwood Baronet to be carried into effect; and for other Purposes.
Earl of Shrewsbury's and John Grace's Trustees' Estate Act 1850	13 & 14 Vict. c. 6 Pr.	29 July 1850
An Act for confirming and carrying into effect an Exchange heretofore made or attempted to be made between the Right Honourable George late Earl of Shrewsbury and John Grace of Whitby in the County of Chester, deceased.
St. Thomas's Hospital Estate Act 1850	13 & 14 Vict. c. 7 Pr.	29 July 1850
An Act for confirming certain Leases granted by the Mayor and Commonalty and Citizens of the City of London, Governors of the Possessions, Revenues, and Goods of the Hospital of Edward late King of England the Sixth, of St. Thomas the Apostle, commonly called St. Thomas's Hospital, and for enabling them to grant Building and other Leases of their Estates.
Somerville's or Mills's (Barford Rectory) Estate Act 1850	13 & 14 Vict. c. 8 Pr.	14 August 1850
An Act for carrying into effect a Contract for the Sale of Messuages and Lands situate in the Parish of Barford in the County of Warwick belonging to the Rectory of the same Parish, and for vesting in Trustees certain Cottages and Lands situate in the Parish of Barford aforesaid, being Part of the Real Estate devised by the Will of Jane Mills Widow, deceased, upon trust to complete a Contract for the Sale thereof.
Cavendish's (or Harcourt's) Estate Act 1850	13 & 14 Vict. c. 9 Pr.	14 August 1850
An Act for creating Powers of Sale in the Freehold and Copyhold Estates comprised in the Marriage Settlement of William Bernard Harcourt, deceased, with Elizabeth Georgiana Harriet his Wife.
School for Orphans of Freemen of the City of London Act 1850 or the London (City) School for Orphans of Freemen Act 1850 or the Foundation of a School for Orphans of Freemen of the City of London Act 1850	13 & 14 Vict. c. 10 Pr.	14 August 1850
An Act for establishing a School for Orphans of Freemen of the City of London.
Duke of Buckingham's Estate Act 1850	13 & 14 Vict. c. 11 Pr.	14 August 1850
An Act to authorize the Trustees of certain Estates called the Chandos Estates, settled by a Deed dated the Third Day of May One thousand eight hundred and twenty-eight on the Most Noble Richard Plantagenet Duke of Buckingham and Chandos and his Issue, to lay out the Monies produced by Sale of Parts of the same Estates in the Purchase of the Family Estates of the said Duke of Buckingham and Chandos called the Buckingham Estates, notwithstanding certain Family Charges thereon, either with an Indemnity against such Charges, to be approved by the Court of Chancery, or with a proportionate Deduction from the Purchase Money; to extend the Powers of re-investing a Part of the same Monies; and to authorize the granting of Building Leases of Parts of the first-mentioned Estates; and for other Purposes.
Sir John Johnstone's Estate Act 1850 or the Earl of Craven's Estate Act 1850	13 & 14 Vict. c. 12 Pr.	14 August 1850
An Act to enable the Trustees of the Will of the late Sir John Lowther Johnstone Baronet, deceased, to grant Building and Repairing Leases for Ninety-nine Years of the Estate devised by the said Will situate in the Boroughs of Weymouth and Melcombe Regis and in the Parish of Radipole in the County of Dorset, and for other Purposes.
Midleton's Estate Act 1850	13 & 14 Vict. c. 13 Pr.	14 August 1850
An Act for giving Effect to a Compromise relating to the Estate of the Bight Honourable George Alan Viscount Midleton, deceased, and, with a view thereto, for vesting the Estates IB England and Ireland late of the said Viscount Midleton in Trustees; and for other Purposes
Henry Earl of Thanet's Estate Act 1850 or the Tufton's Estate Act 1850	13 & 14 Vict. c. 14 Pr.	14 August 1850
An Act to enable the Trustees of the Will of the Bight Honourable Henry Earl of Thanet deceased to raise Money upon the Security of his Estates, for the Repair and Improvement of the Buildings thereon.
Earl of Effingham's Estate Act 1850	13 & 14 Vict. c. 15 Pr.	14 August 1850
An Act to enable the Bight Honourable Henry Earl of Effingham and others to grant Building, Mining, and other Leases of certain Freehold Estates in the Townships of Rotherham and Kimberworth in the County of York, devised by the Will of the Bight Honourable Richard late Earl of Effingham; mmd for other Purposes.
Sir Henry M. Vavasour's Estate Act 1850	13 & 14 Vict. c. 16 Pr.	14 August 1850
An Act for authorizing the Sale of Estates in the County of York devised by the Will of Sir Henry Maghul Mervin Vavasour Baronet, deceased; and for other Purposes.
Earl of Glengall's Estate Act 1850	13 & 14 Vict. c. 17 Pr.	14 August 1850
An Act to authorize the Trustees of the Will of William Mellish Esquire, deceased, to invest a Portion of the Funds subject to the Trusts of the Will of the said William Mellish in the Purchase of the Family Estates in Ireland of the Right Honourable Richard Earl of Glengall.
Earl of Strathmore's Estate Act 1850 or the Bowe's Estate Act 1850	13 & 14 Vict. c. 18 Pr.	14 August 1850
An Act to enlarge and consolidate the Provisions of Two Acts of Parliament (Note: Earl of Strathmore's Estate Act 1845 (8 & 9 Vict. c. 26 Pr.)) (Note: Earl of Strathmore's Estate Act 1847 (10 & 11 Vict. c. 14 Pr.)) relating to the Estates of John Bowes late Earl of Strathmore. (Note: John Bowes, 10th Earl of Strathmore and Kinghorne.)
Hartley's Divorce Act 1850 (Note: This act was not printed by the Queen's Printer.)	13 & 14 Vict. c. 19 Pr.	17 May 1850
An Act to dissolve the Marriage of John Bernard Hartley Esquire with Harriet Say Martlet, his now Wife, and to enable him to marry again; and for other Purposes.
Cobbe's Divorce Act 1850	13 & 14 Vict. c. 20 Pr.	25 June 1850
An Act to dissolve the Marriage of Thomas Cobbe Esquire with Azelie Anne Cobbe his now Wife, and to enable him to marry again; and for other Purposes.
Cautley's Divorce Act 1850	13 & 14 Vict. c. 21 Pr.	15 July 1850
An Act to dissolve the Marriage of Lieutenant-Colonel Proby Thomas Cautley and Frances (his now Wife), and to enable him to marry again; and for other Purposes.
Chippindall's Divorce Act 1850	13 & 14 Vict. c. 22 Pr.	5 August 1850
An Act to dissolve the Marriage of William Chippindall with Mary Anne Chippindall his now Wife, and to enable him to marry again; and for other Purposes.
Ashby's Divorce Act 1850	13 & 14 Vict. c. 23 Pr.	5 August 1850
An Act to dissolve the Marriage of the Reverend Edward Quenby Ashby with Elizabeth Sophia his now Wife, and to enable him to marry again; and for other Purposes.
Earl of Lincoln's Divorce Act 1850	13 & 14 Vict. c. 24 Pr.	14 August 1850
An Act to dissolve the Marriage of the Right Honourable Henry Pelham Pelham Clinton commonly called Earl of Lincoln with the Honourable Lady Susan Harriet Catherine Pelham Clinton commonly called Countess of Lincoln his now Wife, and to enable him to marry again; and for other Purposes therein mentioned.
Hall's Divorce Act 1850	13 & 14 Vict. c. 25 Pr.	14 August 1850
An Act to dissolve the Marriage of Georgina Hall with Henry Foley Hall her now Husband, and to enable the said Georgina Hall to marry again; and for other Purposes therein mentioned.

=== Sources ===
- The Statutes of the United Kingdom of Great Britain and Ireland, 13 & 14 Victoria. 1850. 1850 – via Internet Archive.
- The Statutes of the United Kingdom of Great Britain and Ireland, 13 & 14 Victoria. 1850. 1850 – via Google Books.
- A Collection of the Public General Statutes passed in the Thirteenth and Fourteenth Years of the Reign of Her Majesty Queen Victoria, 1850. London: Eyre and Spottiswoode. 1850 – via Internet Archive.
- A Collection of the Public General Statutes passed in the Thirteenth and Fourteenth Years of the Reign of Her Majesty Queen Victoria, 1850. London: Eyre and Spottiswoode. 1850 – via Internet Archive.
- Journal of the House of Commons. Vol. 105. London: His Majesty's Stationery Office. pp. 3–674 – via HathiTrust.
- Chronological Table of and Index to the Statutes. Vol. 1: To the End of the Session 59 Vict. Sess. 2 (1895) (13th ed.). London: Her Majesty's Stationery Office. 1896. pp. 346–351 – via Google Books.

== See also ==
- List of acts of the Parliament of the United Kingdom
