= List of pirates =

This is a list of known pirates, buccaneers, corsairs, privateers, river pirates, and others involved in piracy and piracy-related activities. This list includes both captains and prominent crew members. For a list of female pirates, see women in piracy. For pirates of fiction or myth, see list of fictional pirates.

== Ancient World: 1208 BC–197 AD ==
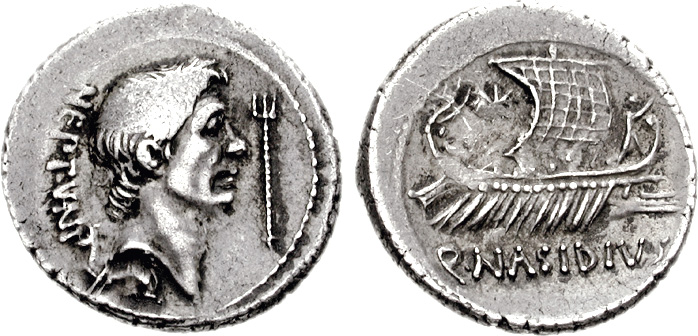
Denarius coin of Sextus Pompeius, Roman pirate and general from the Roman Republic era of 44–43 BC. AR Denarius (3.85 g, 3h). Massilia (Gaul) mint. Q. Nasidius, moneyer. Bare head of Pompey the Great right; trident before, dolphin below / Ship sailing right; star above.

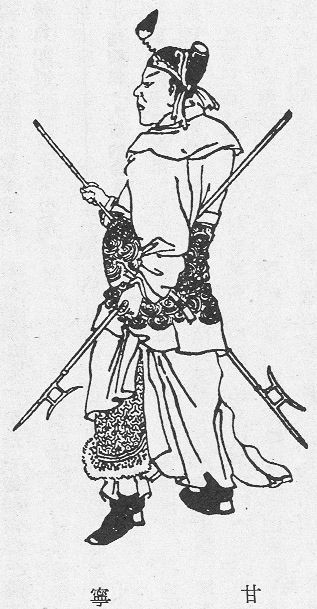
Gan Ning was a notorious pirate and marauder in the late 190s CE, who became a Chinese military general serving under the warlord Sun Quan during the late Eastern Han dynasty.

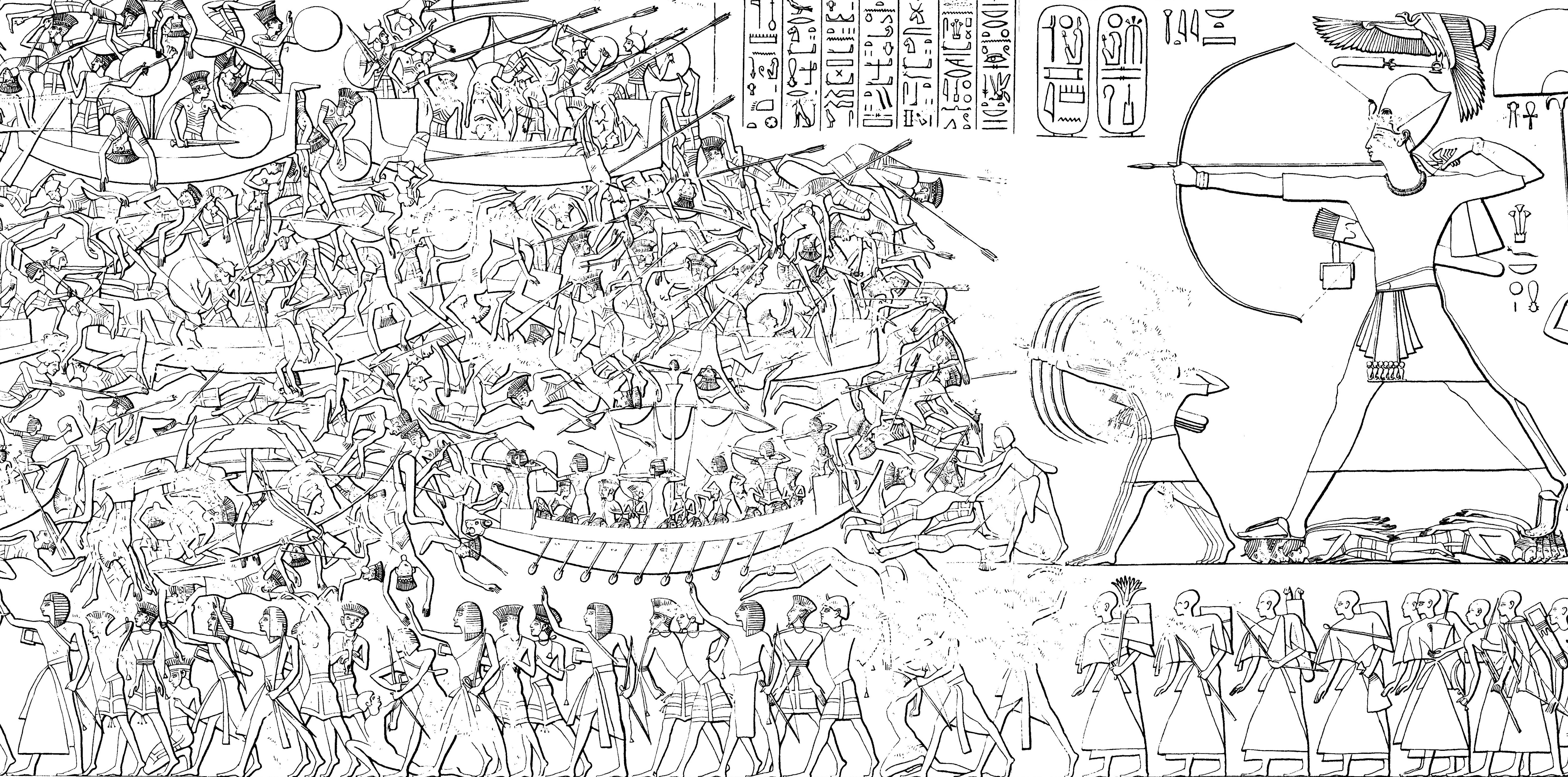
sea people attempting to raid Egypt's coast

Name	Life	Years active	Country of origin	Comments
Meryey	d. 1213-1203 BC		Ancient Libya	Lead the Libyans and the sea people in raiding Egypt's coast and the nile delta but was defeated by the Pharaoh Merneptah in the Battle of Perire.
Dionysius the Phocaean	fl. 494 BC	494 BC	Greece	Phocaean admiral active against Carthaginian and Tyrsenian merchants in the years following the Greco–Persian Wars.
Glauketas	fl. 315–300 BC	315–300 BC	Greece	Greek inscriptions of the Athenian navy raiding his base on Kynthnos Island and capturing him and his men read "making the sea safe for those that sailed thereon."
Teuta of Illyria	fl. 231–227 BC		Illyria	Queen regent, fostered the pirates among her people, and had a Roman diplomat killed by them.
Demetrius of Pharos	d. 214 BC		Pharos (Hellenic)	His actions precipitated the Second Illyrian War.
Gan Ning	fl. 180s–210s	190–197	China	His party carried bells as their trademark to frighten the commoners.
Genthus of Illyria	fl. 181–168 BC		Illyria	Was accused by the Romans of organizing and aiding pirate raids in Italy.
Sextus Pompeius	67–35 BC		Rome	He was the last focus of opposition to the Second Triumvirate.
Gannascus	d. 47	AD 41–47	Cananefates (Netherlands)	Deserted Cananefate soldier. Leading pirate raids of the Chauci into province Gallia Belgica (Belgium) between AD 41–47, when he was captured by the Romans.
Anicetus	d. 69		Pontus (Hellenic)	Was the leader of an unsuccessful anti-Roman uprising in Pontus in 69

== Middle Ages: 400–1585 ==
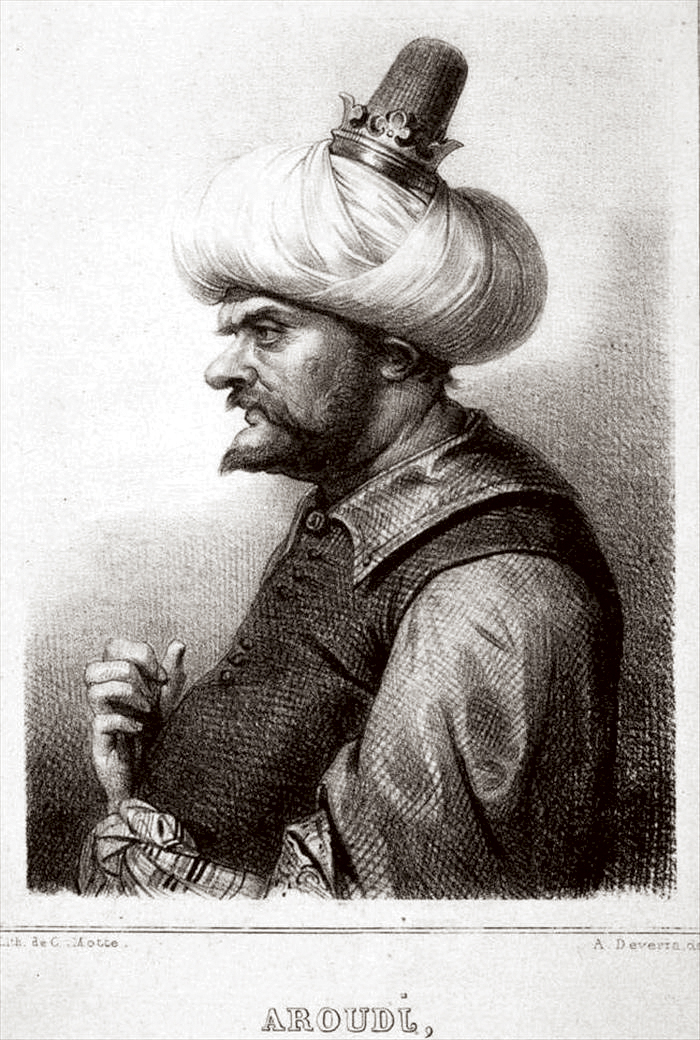
Aruj, or Oruç, Reis was a Barbary privateer and later Admiral in Ottoman service who became known as Barbarossa – or Redbeard – amongst Christians.

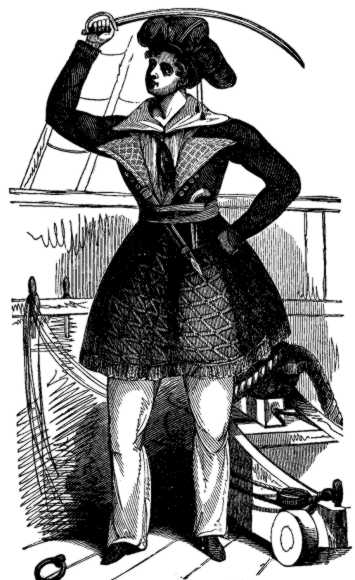
Awilda was a 5th-century pirate who, along with friends, dressed up as sailors and commandeered a ship.

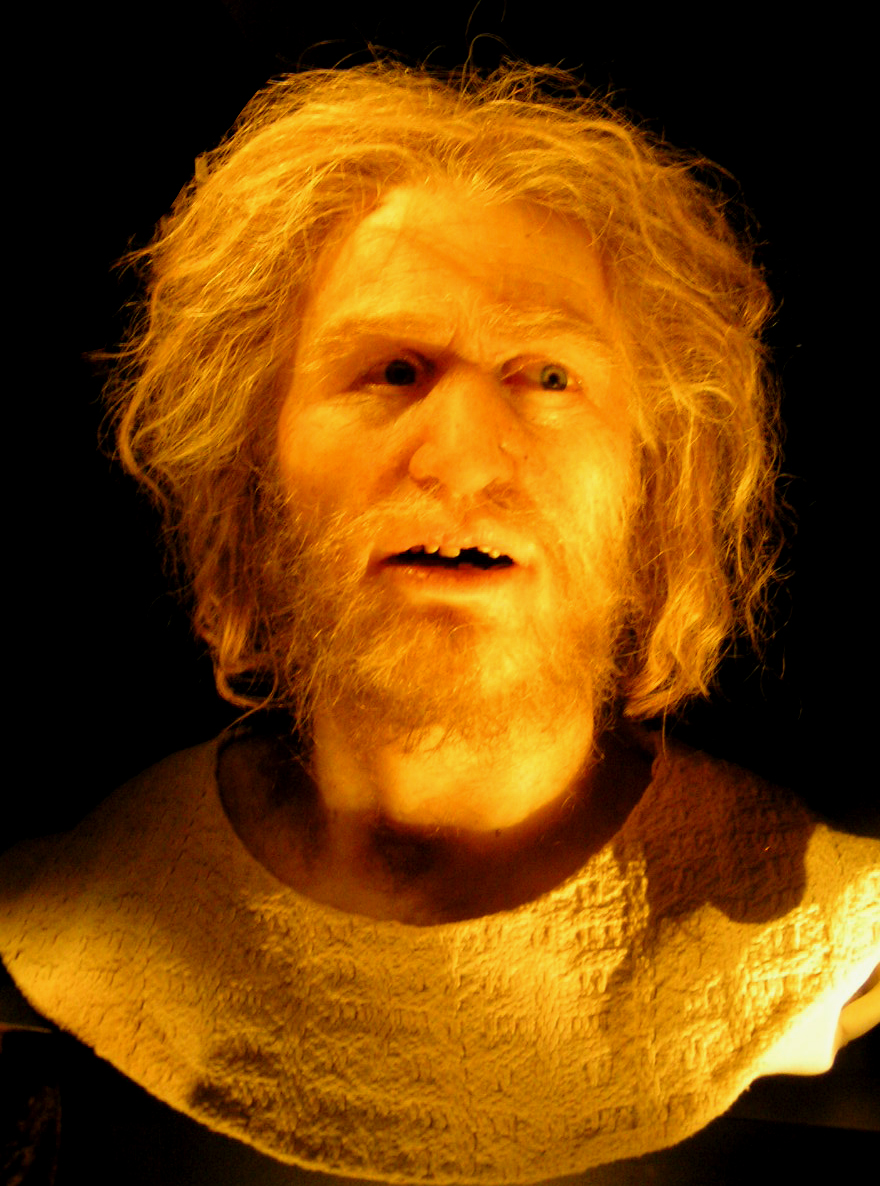
Klaus Störtebeker was a 14th–15th century German pirate and one of the leaders of the Likedeelers, a combination of former Victual Brothers (Vitalienbrüder) who roamed Northern European seas.

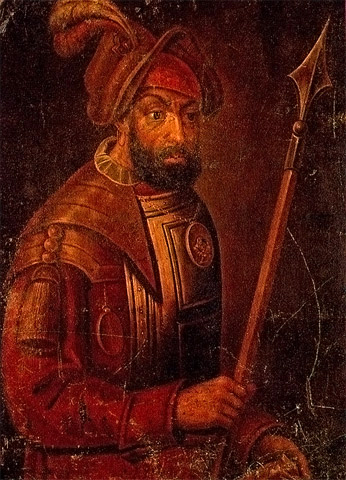
Yermak Timofeyevich, a 16th-century Cossack river pirate who started the Russian conquest of Siberia in the reign of Tsar Ivan the Terrible

Name	Life	Years Active	Country of origin	Comments
Awilda	5th century		Scandinavia	She and some of her female friends dressed like sailors and commandeered a ship.
Guynemer of Boulogne	fl. 1097	1080s–1090s	County of Boulogne	Boulognese pirate who played a role in the First Crusade.
Wimund	b. 1147		England	He was a bishop who became a seafaring warlord adventurer.
Kanakes		1190s	Cyprus	A Cypriot Greek pirate. Raided Cypriot coasts and abducted the royal family.
Eustace the Monk	c. 1170–1217		France	He was a mercenary for both England and France.
Alv Erlingsson	d. 1290		Norway	He was a favorite of the Queen, yet committed countless acts of piracy throughout his life
John Crabbe	d. 1352	1305–1332	Flanders	Flemish pirate known for his successful use of a ship-mounted catapult. Once won the favor of Robert the Bruce and acted as a naval officer for England during the Hundred Years' War (after being captured by King Edward III.)
Hennig Wichmann	1370–1402	1392–1402	Germany	A German pirate and one of the leaders of the Likedeelers, a combination of former Victual Brothers (Vitalienbrüder)
Jeanne de Clisson	1300–1359	1343–1356	Brittany	A French-Breton pirate. She raided French towns and ships in the English Channel.
Magister Wigbold	1365–1402	1392–1402	Germany	A German pirate and one of the leaders of the Likedeelers, a combination of former Victual Brothers (Vitalienbrüder)
John Hawley	1340–1408	1380s	England	An English mayor, privateer and alleged pirate. Raided in the English Channel.
Klaus Störtebeker	1360–1401	1392–1401	Germany	A German pirate and one of the leaders of the Likedeelers, a combination of former Victual Brothers (Vitalienbrüder)
Baldassare Cossa	1370–1415		Procida	Antipope during the Western Schism, John XXIII was accused of—among other crimes—piracy, incest and sodomy.
Eric of Pomerania		1394–1405	Germany (Pomerania)	A Pomeranian duke supporting privateers in the Baltic Sea region and later going on pirate raids himself.
Bartholomeus Voet	b. early 1400		Germany	Second leader of Victual Brothers, plundered and burned down the Norwegian city Bergen in 1429
Cord Widderich	d. 1447	1404–1447	Germany	A pirate active during political conflicts between Dithmarschen and North Frisia in the early 15th century.
Barnim VI, Duke of Pomerania	c. 1365–1405		Germany (Pomerania)	The first king of the Nordic Kalmar Union, he spent his last years living on the island of Gotland and "sent forth piratical expeditions against friend and foe alike".
William Aleyn	fl. 1448	1432–1448	England	English pirate active in the Thames and English Channel. Associate of William Kyd.
Aruj	1474–1518	1503–1518	Ottoman Empire	An Ottoman privateer and Bey (Governor) of Algiers and Beylerbey (Chief Governor) of the West Mediterranean.
Jean Ango	1480–1551		France	A French ship-owner who provided ships to Francis I for exploration of the globe.
Hayreddin Barbarossa	c. 1478–1546	1504–1545	Ottoman Empire	An Ottoman privateer and later Admiral who dominated the Mediterranean for decades.
James Alday	1516–1576	1540s	England	An English privateer. Raided Spanish ports with James Logan and William Cooke.
Pier Gerlofs Donia	c. 1480–1520		Netherlands (Frisia)	From Arum, Friesland. Known as Grutte Pier 'big Pier' because of his length. Another nickname was 'Cross of the Dutchmen'. A Frisian warrior, pirate, freedom fighter, folk hero and rebel. Mainly active with his band De Arumer Zwarte Hoop 'Arum's Black Heap' at the Zuyderzee, the Netherlands.
Erlend Eindridesson		1445–?	Norway	A nobleman from Norway, plundered German ships in the Sognefjord.
Jean Fleury	d. 1527	c. 1521–1527	France	French privateer and naval officer under Jean Ango. Seized three Spanish ships carrying Aztec treasure from Mexico to Spain in 1523.
Magnus Heinason	1545–1589		Faroe Islands	Faroese naval hero and privateer. Was executed for piracy, though charges were later dropped.
Klein Henszlein	d. 1573	1560–1573	Germany	A 16th-century pirate who raided shipping in the North Sea until his defeat and capture by a fleet from Hamburg
Wijerd Jelckama	c. 1490–1523		Germany (Frisia)	The nephew of Pier Gerlofs Donia (also known as Grutte Pier), fought along his side against the Saxon and Hollandic invaders.
William Kyd	fl. 1430–1453	1430s–1450s	England	English pirate active in South West England during the early-to-mid-15th century.
Gödeke Michels	d. 1402	1392–1402	Germany	A German pirate and one of the leaders of the Likedeelers, a combination of former Victual Brothers (Vitalienbrüder)
Martin Pechlin	1480–1526		Germany	Died in Mandal, Norway. One of the most feared pirates in his time
Turgut Reis	1485–1565		Ottoman Empire	A Turkish privateer and Ottoman admiral as well as Bey of Algiers; Beylerbey of the Mediterranean; and first Bey later Pasha of Tripoli.
Didrik Pining	c. 1430–1491		Germany	A pirate and privateer operating in the North Sea. Often partnered with Hans Pothorst.
Hans Pothorst	c. 1440–1490		Germany	A pirate and privateer operating in the North Sea. Often partnered with Didrik Pining.
Salih Reis	c. 1488–1568		Ottoman Empire	A Turkish privateer and Ottoman admiral.
Yermak Timofeyevich	c. 1532-42–1585	?–1582	Russia	A leader of a gang of river pirates, along the Don River region, of Russia and later, led an expedition, in the Russian conquest of Siberia, in the reign of Tsar Ivan the Terrible.
Kristoffer Trondson	c. 1500–1565	c. 1535–1542	Norway	A Norwegian nobleman-turned pirate and privateer. Operated in the North Sea and the Baltic Sea. Gave up piracy in 1542 and eventually, became admiral of the Danish-Norwegian Fleet.

== Rise of the English Sea Dogs and Dutch Corsairs: 1560–1650 ==
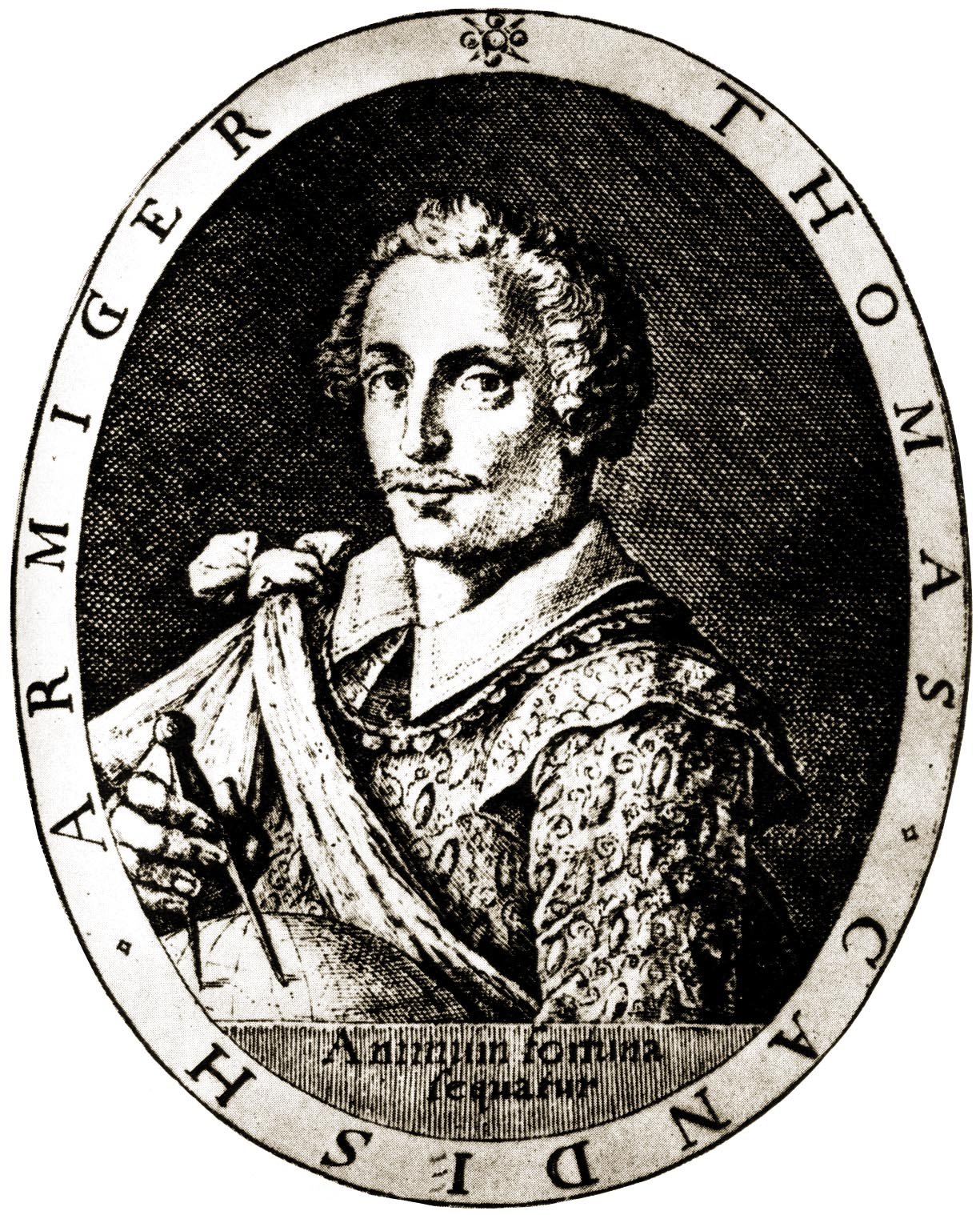
The first man to intentionally circumnavigate the globe, Thomas Cavendish also raided numerous Spanish towns and ships in the New World.

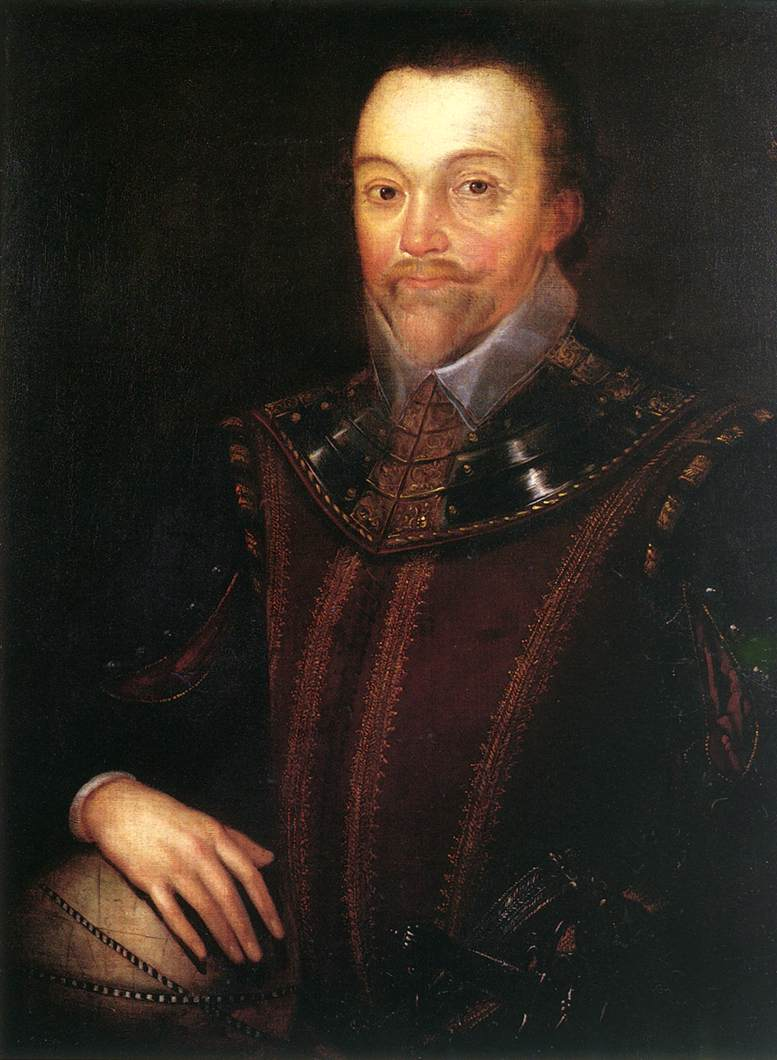
Known as "el Draque" (the Dragon) in Spain, Sir Francis Drake raided Spanish merchant shipping in the Atlantic.

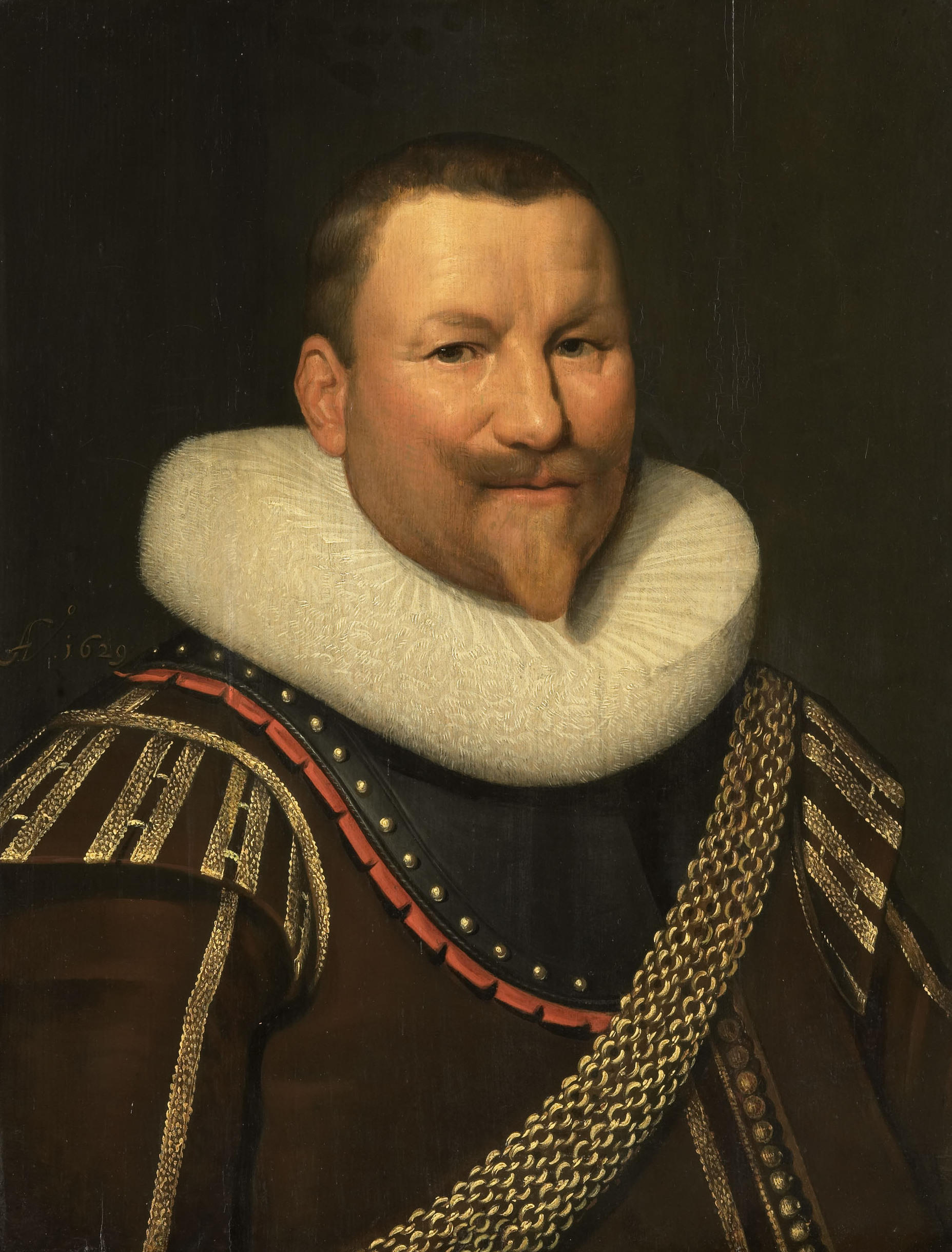
After serving as a Spanish galley slave for four years, Piet Hein later captured 11,509,524 guilders of cargo from the Spanish treasure fleet.

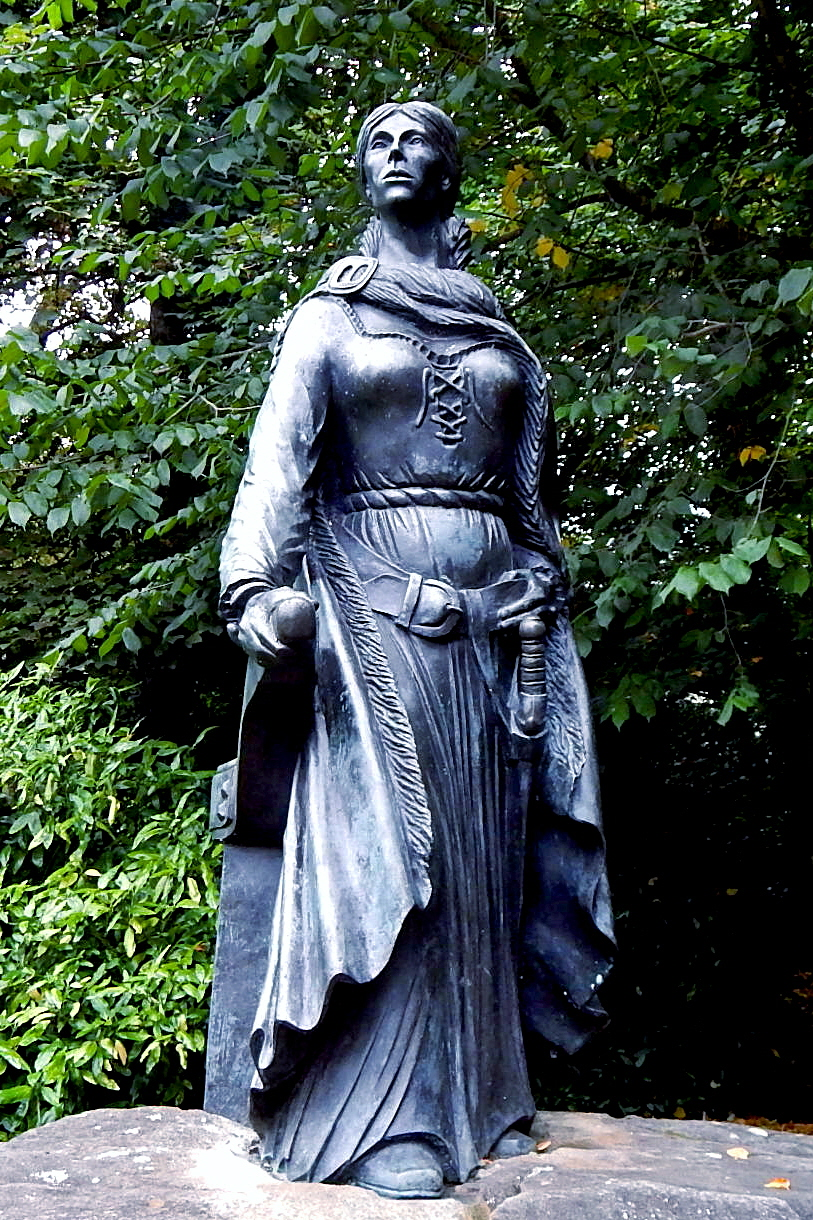
Grace O'Malley was an important figure in Irish legend who is still recognised in popular culture today.

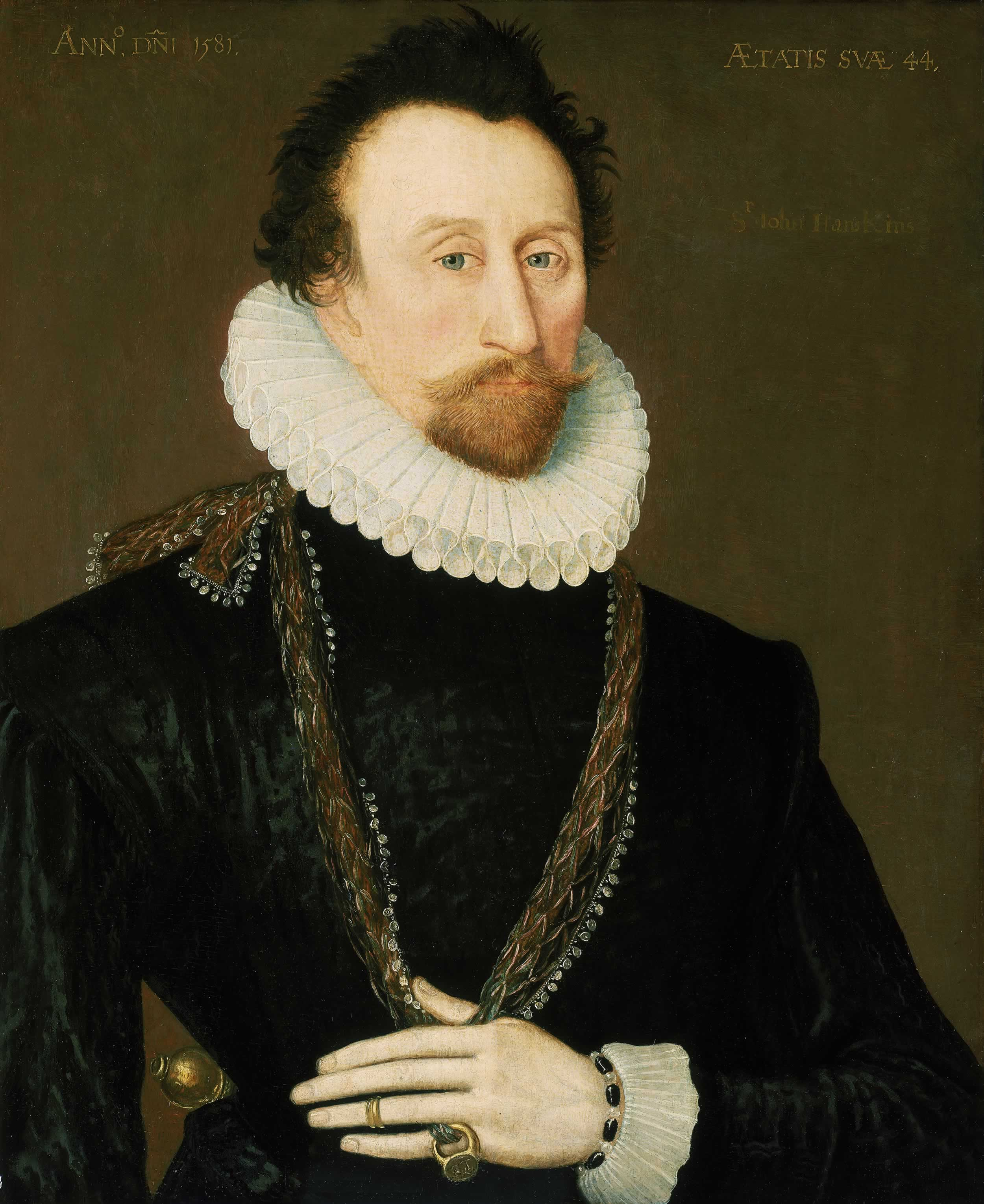
Sir John Hawkins. An Elizabethan corsair active off the coasts of West Africa and Venezuela

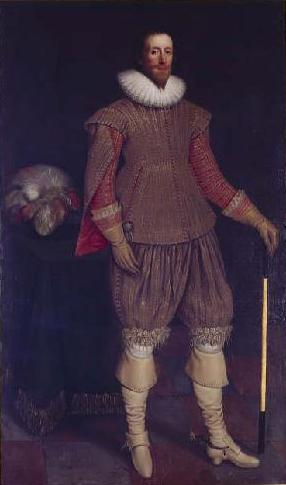
Sir Francis Verney was one of the most feared Barbary corsairs during the early 17th century.

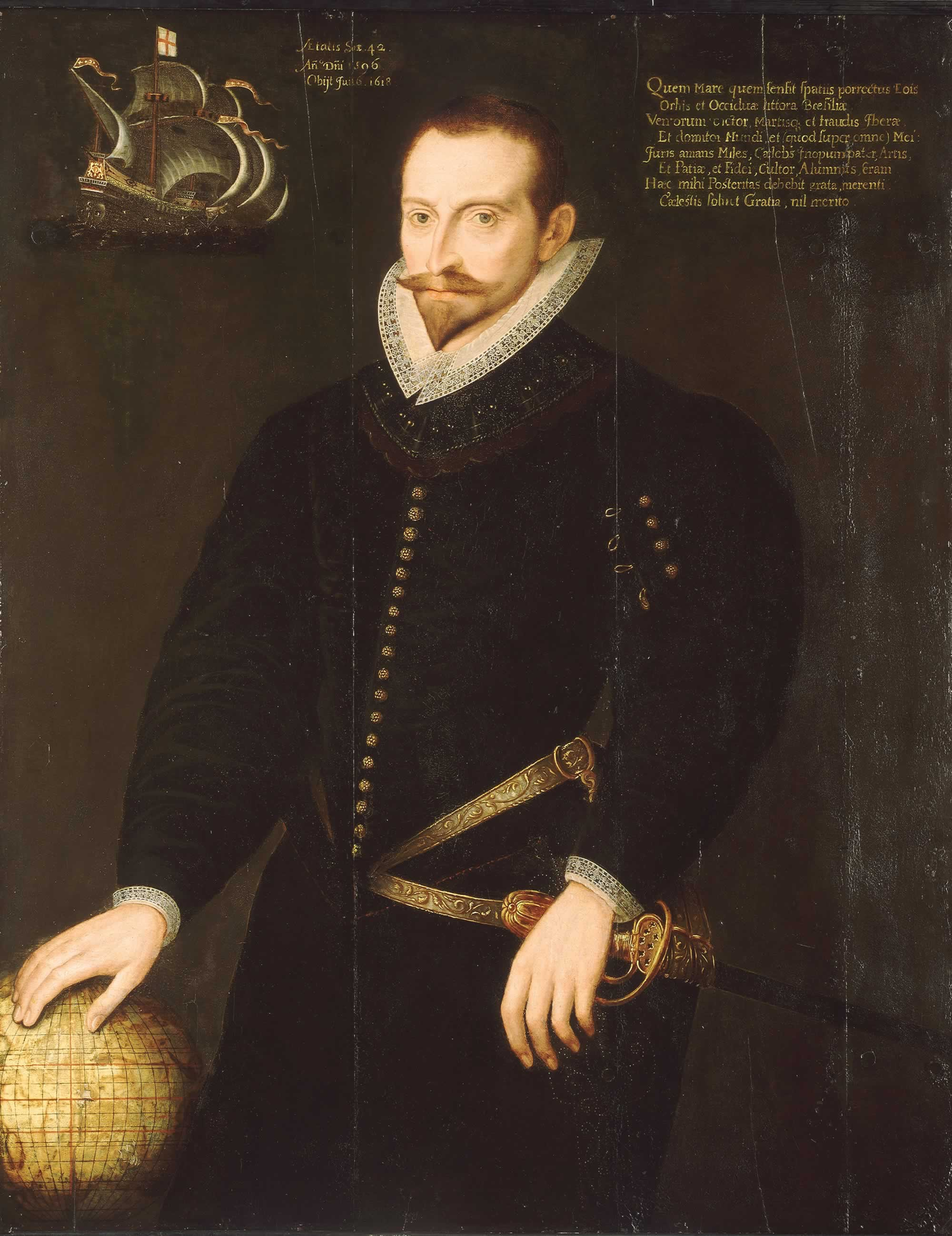
Sir James Lancaster VI commanded the first East India Company voyage in 1601

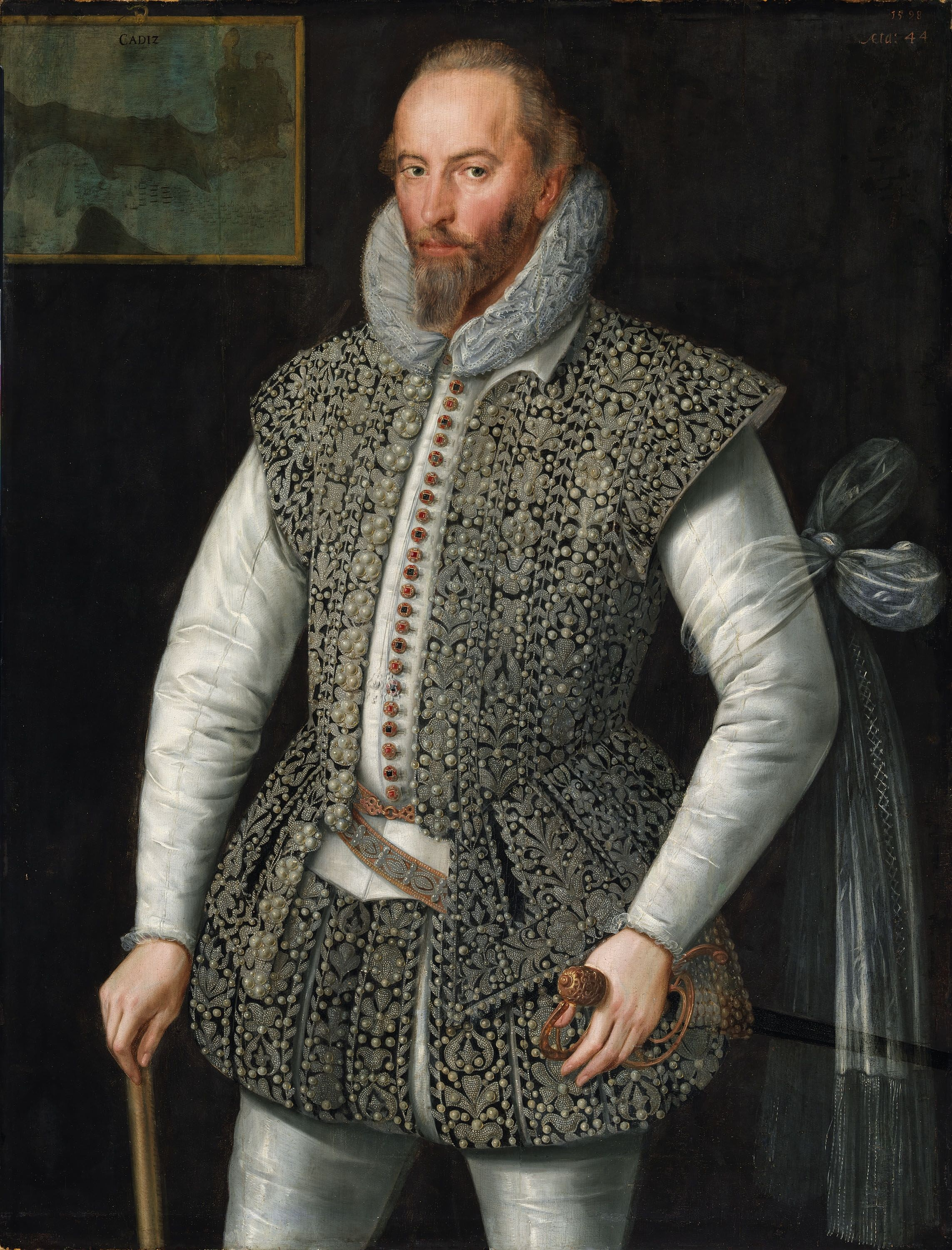
Sir Walter Raleigh who commanded two expeditions to search the golden city of El Dorado in Spanish colony of Guayana (actual Venezuela)

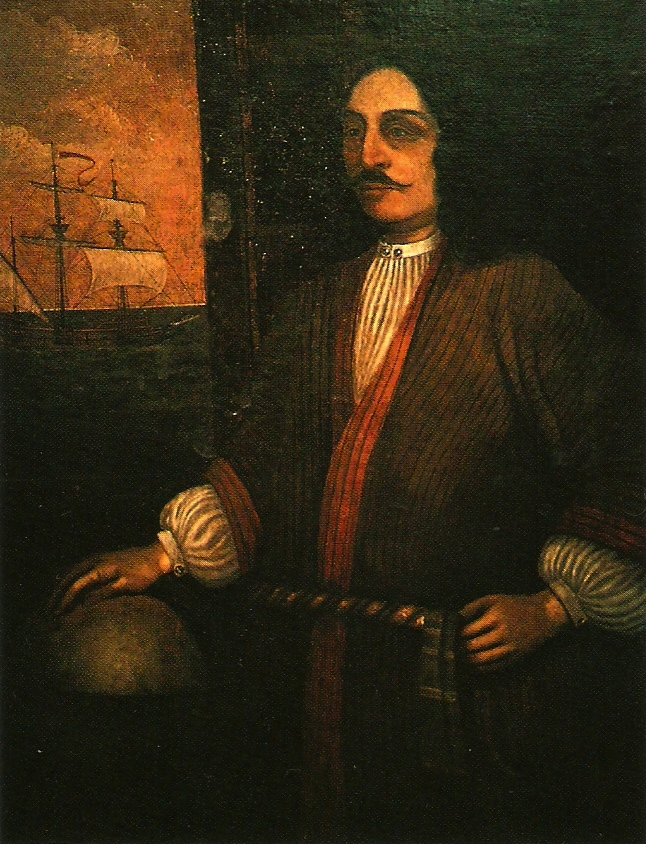
Sir George Somers. In 1595 co-led with Amyas Preston the raid on Caracas and Coro

Name	Life	Years Active	Country of origin	Comments
Uluj Ali	1519–1587	1536–1550	Turkey	An Italian-born Muslim corsair, who later became an Ottoman admiral and Chief Admiral (Kaptan-ı Derya) of the Ottoman Fleet in the 16th century.
Nicholas Alvel	early 17th century	1603	England	Active in the Ionian Sea.
Pedro Menéndez de Avilés	1519–1574	1565	Spanish	A Spanish Admiral and pirate hunter, de Aviles is remembered for his destruction of the French settlement of Fort Caroline in 1565.
Samuel Axe	early 17th century	1629–1645	England	An English privateer in Dutch service, Axe served with English forces in the Dutch Revolt against Habsburg rule.
Sir Andrew Barton	1466–1511	to 1511	Scotland	Served under a Scottish letter of marque, but was described a pirate by English and Portuguese.
Abraham Blauvelt	d. 1663	1640–1663	Netherlands	One of the last Dutch corsairs of the mid-17th century, Blauvelt mapped much of South America.
Jambe de Bois	d. 1563	1550s–1560s	France	Known for his sacking of Santiago de Cuba in 1554
Jean Bontemps	early 16th century	1559–1572	France	Active in the Caribbean Sea. He attacked Santa Marta, Cartagena de Indias, Rio de Hacha and Margarita island.
Jan de Bouff	early 17th century	1602	Netherlands	de Bouff served as a Dunkirker in Habsburg service during the Dutch Revolt.
Rock Brasiliano	c. 1630–1671?	c. 1654–1671	Netherlands, Brazilian	Pirate born in the town of Groningen, long residence of Dutch colony of Brasil. Active in the Caribbean and captain of pirates of Jamaica. Known for his fury and great cruelty and sadism, especially against Spaniards.
Hendrik Brouwer	1581–1643	1600, 1643	Netherlands	Brouwer was a privateer who fought the Habsburgs during the Dutch revolt, holding the city of Castro, Chile hostage for a period of two months.
Nathaniel Butler	b. 1578	1639	England	Despite a comparatively unsuccessful career as a privateer, Butler was later colonial governor of Bermuda.
John Callis	c. 1558–1587?	c. 1574–1587	Wales	Welsh pirate active along the southern coast of Wales.
Thomas Cavendish	1560–1592	1587–1592	England	The first man to intentionally circumnavigate the globe, Cavendish also raided numerous Spanish towns and ships in the New World.
Jacob Collaart	17th century	1625–1635	Netherlands	A Flemish admiral who served as privateer and one of the Dunkirkers in Spanish Habsburg service during the Dutch Revolt, responsible for the destruction of at least 150 fishing boats.
Claes Compaan	1587–1660	1621–1627	Netherlands	Former Dutch corsair and privateer, he later became a pirate and was successful in capturing hundreds of ships in Europe, the Barbary coast and West Africa.
Sebastião Gonçalves Tibau	1587–1616	1605–1616	Portugal	A Portuguese pirate active in Bay of Bengal and in the rivers of Bhati region of Bengal.He established Island of Sandwip in Bengal as his base and slaughtered and enslaved thousands of men and women in Bengal.
Baltazar de Cordes	d. 1601?	1598–1601	Netherlands	A Dutch corsair who fought against the Spanish during the early 17th century.
Simon Danziker	d. 1611	1600s–1610s	Netherlands	Dutch corsair and privateer who later became a Barbary corsair based in Algiers and Tunis during the early 17th century. He and John Ward dominated the Western Mediterranean during the early 17th century.
Sir Francis Drake	1540–1596	1563–1596	England	Known as "el Draque" (the Dragon), he was an Elizabethan corsair who raided Spanish merchant shipping on behalf of Queen Elizabeth I.
Peter Easton	1570–1619	1602	England	A privateer, then pirate, who was able to retire in Villefranche, Savoy with an estimated worth of two million pounds.
Juan Garcia	fl. 1622	1620s	Spain	One of the Spanish privateers who accompanied Jan Jacobsen on his last voyage in 1622.
Sir Michael Geare	c. 1565–?	c. 1584–1603	England	Elizabethan Sea Dog active in the West Indies up until the turn of the 17th century.
Piers Griffith	1568	1628	Wales	From 1600 to 1603, Griffith was active against Spanish shipping.
Sir John Hawkins	1532–1595	1554, 1564, 1567	England	An Elizabethan corsair active off the coasts of West Africa and Venezuela. His work in ship design was important during the threat of invasion from the Spanish Armada.
Piet Pieterszoon Hein	1577–1629	1628	Netherlands	After serving as a Spanish galley slave for four years, Hein later captured 11,509,524 guilders of cargo from the Spanish treasure fleet.
Moses Cohen Henriques	early 17th century	1620s and 1630s	Netherlands	Dutch pirate of Portuguese Sephardic Jewish origin active in the Caribbean against Spain and Brazil against Portugal
Richard Ingle	1609–1653	1644–1653	England	Maryland privateer and pirate. In an extension of the English Civil War in the Catholic colony of Maryland he and the Puritan settlers raided ships belonging to Catholics and the colonial governor Lord Baltimore. Ingle seized control of the Maryland capital briefly and was later hanged for piracy.
Pieter Adriaanszoon Ita	fl. 1628–1630	1620s	Netherlands	Dutch corsair and privateer. Commanded one of the earliest and largest expeditions against the Portugal and Spain in the Caribbean during 1628.
Jan Jacobsen	d. 1622	1610s–1620s	Netherlands	Flemish-born privateer in English service during the Eighty Years' War.
Willem Jacobszoon	fl. 1624–1625	1620s	Netherlands	Dutch corsair who accompanied Pieter Schouten on one of the first major expeditions to the West Indies.
Willem Jansen	fl. 1600	1600s	Netherlands	Dutch corsair based in Duinkerken and one time officer under Jacques Colaert.
Jan Janszoon	1570–after 1641		Republic of Salé	Known also as Murad Reis, originally Dutch, he was a fighter captured by the Algerian corsairs who converted to Islam in 1618. He began serving as a Navy fighter in Algiers, then after gaining experience there, he was invited to join the 17th-century "Salé Rovers".
Zheng Jing	1643–1682	1662–1682	China	Chinese pirate and warlord. The eldest son of Koxinga and grandson of Zheng Zhilong, he succeeded his father as ruler of Tainan and briefly occupied Fujian.
Cornelius Jol	1597–1641	1630s–1640s	Netherlands	Dutch corsair successful against the Spanish in the West Indies. One of the first to use a wooden peg leg.
Shirahama Kenki	16th-early 17th centuries		Japan	Japanese pirate and one of the first Japanese with whom the southern Vietnamese kingdom of the Nguyễn Lords made contact.
Lawrence Keymis	fl. –1618	1595/1596–1617	England	Lawrence Keymis was a seaman and companion of Sir Walter Raleigh in his expeditions to Spanish colony of Guayana in 1595 and 1617 to search for England El Dorado (actual Venezuela). In another expedition in 1596 led a force inland Guayana along the banks of the Essequibo River, reaching what he wrongly believed to be Lake Parime.
Sir James Lancaster	1554–1618	1591–1603	England	Elizabethan Sea Dog active in India during the late 16th century. Later a chief director for the East India Company.
Peter Love	d. 1610		England	An English pirate who set up base in the Outer Hebrides and was active around Ireland and Scotland. He was betrayed by the outlaw Neil MacLeod and executed in 1610.
Hendrick Jacobszoon Lucifer	1583–1627	1627	Netherlands	Hendrick captured 1.2 million guilders from a Honduran treasure fleet, but was mortally wounded in the process.
Sir Henry Mainwaring	1587–1653	1610–1616	England	English privateer and pirate hunter. His pirate fleet nearly broke the truce between England and Spain following the Anglo-Spanish War.
Arnaut Mami	mid-16th century	1572–1576	Albania	Active in the Narrow Sea (the modern day Adriatic Sea). He was the squadron admiral and the supreme commander of all Islamic vessels in North Africa and Pasha Algiers, known as the most formidable corsair of that period.
Jan Mendoza	b. Late 1500	Early 1600	Spain or Netherlands	Plundered the water between Iceland and Norway, and the coast of Finnmark and Nordland. Hunted down and captured by Admiral Jørgen Daa and explorer Jens Munk by order of King Christian IV of Denmark-Norway. Mendoza was executed by hanging in Copenhagen. The king recovered 8 treasure chests of gold coins, each chest requerd 10 man to lift.
Olivier van Noort	1558–1627	1598–1601	Netherlands	Despite his venture being of limited success, it was the inspiration that led to the formation of the Dutch East India Company.
Roger North	1585–1652	1617	England	Roger North was a seaman and companion of Sir Walter Raleigh in his expeditions to Spanish colony of Guayana in 1617 to search for England El Dorado (actual Venezuela). North in 1619 petitioned for letters patent authorising him to establish the king's right to the coast and country adjoining the River Amazon; to found a plantation or settlement there, and to open a direct trade with the natives.
John Nutt		1620–1623	England	An English pirate active in Newfoundland.
Grace O'Malley	1530–1603	1560s–1600s	Ireland	An important figure in Irish legend who is still present in popular culture today.
John Oxenham	1536–1580	1570s–1600s	England	Elizabethan Sea Dog and associate of Sir Frances Drake during the early years of the Anglo-Spanish War. First English privateer to enter the Pacific though Panama.
William Parker	d. 1617	1590s–1600s	England	Elizabethan Sea Dog active in the West Indies. Successfully captured Porto Bello and Margarita island in 1602 without firing a shot. He also captured and held for ransom the Cubagua pearl-boats and captured a Portuguese slave ship.
Ali Pegelin		c. 1605–1645	Netherlands	Also known as Pisselingh, from Vlissingen (hence his name Pisselingh). Was for 40 years one of the most prominent pirates of Algiers. Settled in 1645 in Algiers with great fortune.
Pedro de la Plesa	fl. 1622	1620s	Spain	He and Juan Garcia who joined Jan Jacobsen on his final voyage in 1622.
Sir Amyas Preston	c. ?–1609	c. 1595–1597	England	Elizabethan Sea Dog as part of expedition of Walter Raleigh in 1595 sacked Caracas and Coro with George Somers.
Sir Walter Raleigh	fl. 1554–1618	1595–1617	England	Elizabethan corsair who commanded two expeditions to search for England the fabled "El Dorado" in the Spanish colony of Guayana (modern-day Venezuela).
Assan Reis	fl. 1626	1620s	Netherlands	Former Dutch privateer turned Barbary corsair. He attacked the Dutch ship St. Jan Babtista under Jacob Jacobsen of Ilpendam on March 7, 1626.
Murat Reis the Elder	1506–1608	1534–1608	Rhodes	An Ottoman Albanian privateer and Ottoman admiral who took part in all of the early naval campaigns of Turgut Reis.
James Riskinner	17th century	1630s	England	A lieutenant on the ship Warwick, then part of a fleet under the command of Nathaniel Butler, he later took part in a privateering expedition between May–September 1639.
Jean-François de La Rocque de Roberval	1500–1560	1623–1645	France	French nobleman and adventurer who, through his friendship with King Francis, became the first Lieutenant General of New France. As a corsair he attacked towns and shipping throughout the Spanish Main, from Cuba to Colombia. He died in Paris as one of the first Huguenot martyrs.
Ben Robins	1607–1640		England	English privateer in the English West Indies.
Isaac Rochussen	1631–1710	1660s–1670s	Netherlands	A Dutch corsair active against the English during the Second and Third Anglo-Dutch War. His capture of The Falcon, an East India Company merchantman, was one of the most valuable prizes captured during the late-17th century.
Mahieu Romboutsen	fl. 1636	1630s	Netherlands	Dutch corsair in the service of Spain. Was part of a three ship squadron under Jacques Colaert and was captured with him after a five-hour battle with Jan Evertsen.
William Rous	fl. 1636–1645	1630s–1640s	Netherlands	Dutch corsair and privateer based on Providence Island. He was involved in privateering expeditions for the Providence Island Company and later commander of Fort Henry.
Jan van Ryen	d. 1627	1620s	Netherlands	Dutch corsair active in the West Indies. Reportedly killed with a number of colonists attempting to establish one of the first colonies on the Wiapoco in Dutch Guiana.
Pieter Schouten	fl. 1624–1625	1620s	Netherlands	Dutch corsair who led one of the Dutch expeditions to the West Indies.
Sir George Somers	c. 1564–1610	c. 1595–1607	England	Elizabethan Sea Dog in 1595 sacked Caracas and Coro with Amyas Preston. Active in the West Indies up until the turn of the 17th century.
Jacques de Sores	16th century	1555	France	A French pirate whose sole documented act was his attack and burning of Havana in 1555.
Matsura Takanobu	1529–1599		Japan	One of the most powerful feudal lords of Kyūshū and one of the first lords to allow trading with Europeans
Guillaume Le Testu	1509–1573	1560s–1570s	France	French privateer, explorer and cartographer. First navigator to chart Australia in 1531.
Dirck Simonszoon van Uitgeest	fl. 1628–1629	1620s	Netherlands	Dutch corsair who commanded a Dutch West India Company expedition to Brazil bringing back over 12 Portuguese and Spanish prizes.
Nicholas Valier	middle 16th century	1567	France	A French hugonote privateer that plundered Borburata, Coro and Curazao
De Veenboer	d. 1620	1600s–1610s	Netherlands	De Veenboer meaning the Peat Bog Farmer. Former Dutch corsair and privateer. Later became a Barbary corsair under Simon the Dancer and eventually commanded the Algiers corsair fleet.
Sir Francis Verney	1584–1615	1608–1610	England	English nobleman who left behind his inheritance to become a Barbary corsair.
Johannes van Walbeeck	fl. 1634	1620s–1630s	Netherlands	Dutch admiral and corsair. Captured Curaçao in 1634 and later served as governor.
John Ward	1552–1622	1603–1610s	England	A notorious English pirate around the turn of the 17th century who later became a Barbary Corsair operating out of Tunis during the early 1600s.
Jacob Willekens	1571–1633	1590s–1630s	Netherlands	Dutch admiral who led Dutch corsairs on the first major privateering expedition to the West Indies.
Cornelis Wittebol	fl. 1622	1620s	Netherlands	Dutch corsair in Spanish service. In February 1622, attacked a fishing fleet from the Veere and Maasmond sinking several ships and bringing back the survivors to ransom in Duinkerken.
Hendrik Worst	fl. 1624	1620s	Netherlands	Dutch corsair who accompanied Pieter Schouten in his expedition to the West Indies.
Wang Zhi	16th century	1551–1555	China	One of the chief figures among the wokou of the 16th century.
Zheng Zhilong	1604–1662	1623–1645	China	A convert to Christianity, Zhilon collaborated with Dutch forces, helping to create a monopoly on trade with Japan.
Filips van Zuylen	fl. 1624	1620s	Netherlands	Dutch corsair active against the Portuguese in West Africa.

== Age of the Buccaneers: 1650–1690 ==
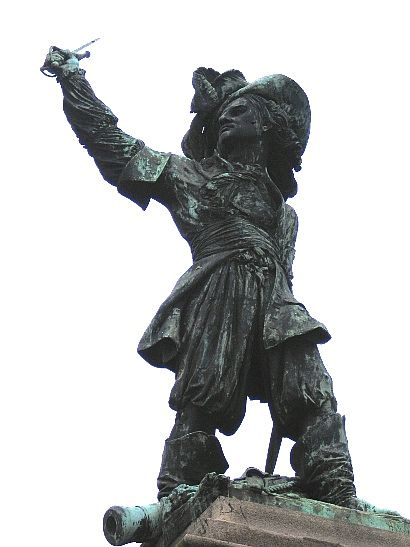
Although Jean Bart was born the son of a fisherman, he was able to retire as an admiral in French service on the strength of his captures during his time as a privateer.

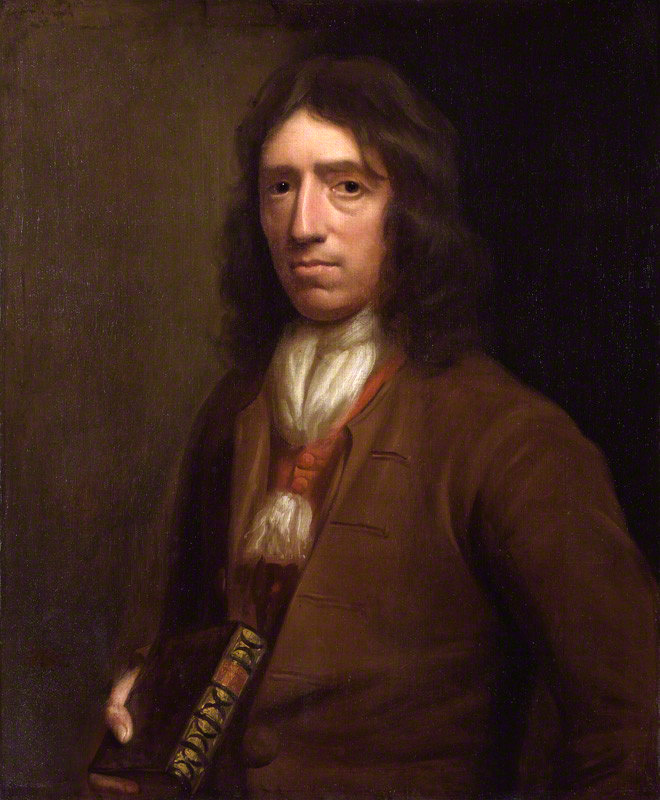
William Dampier was the first Englishman to explore or map parts of New Holland (Australia) and New Guinea, and was also the first person to circumnavigate the world three times.

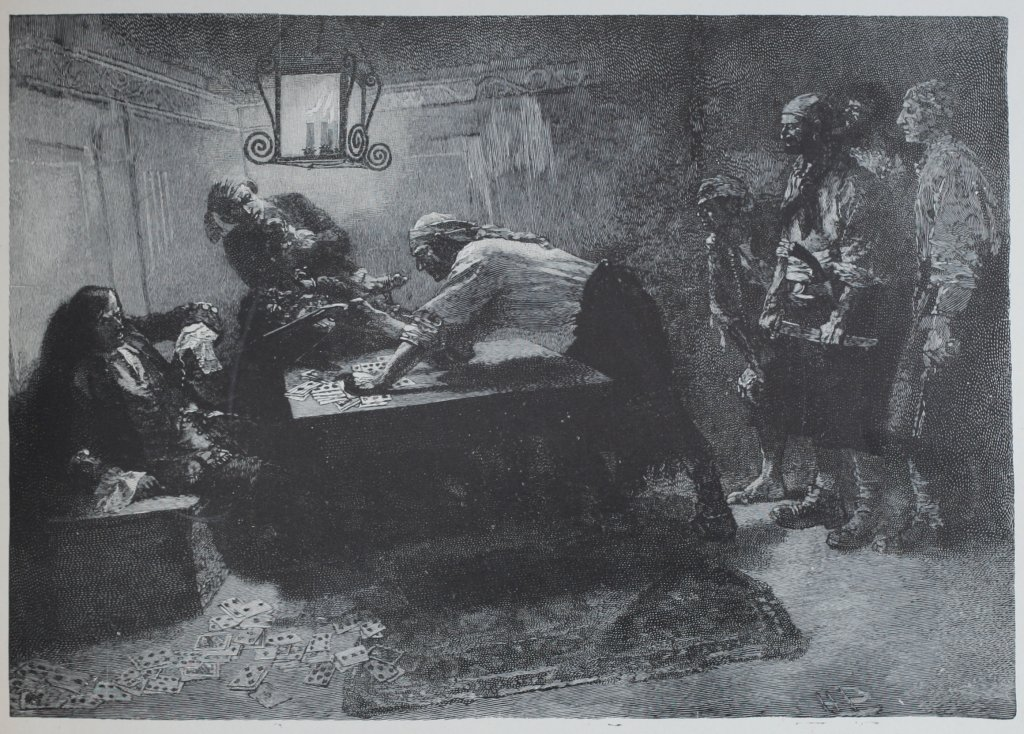
Known only for a single attack against a Spanish galleon (pictured), Pierre le Grand's existence is disputed.

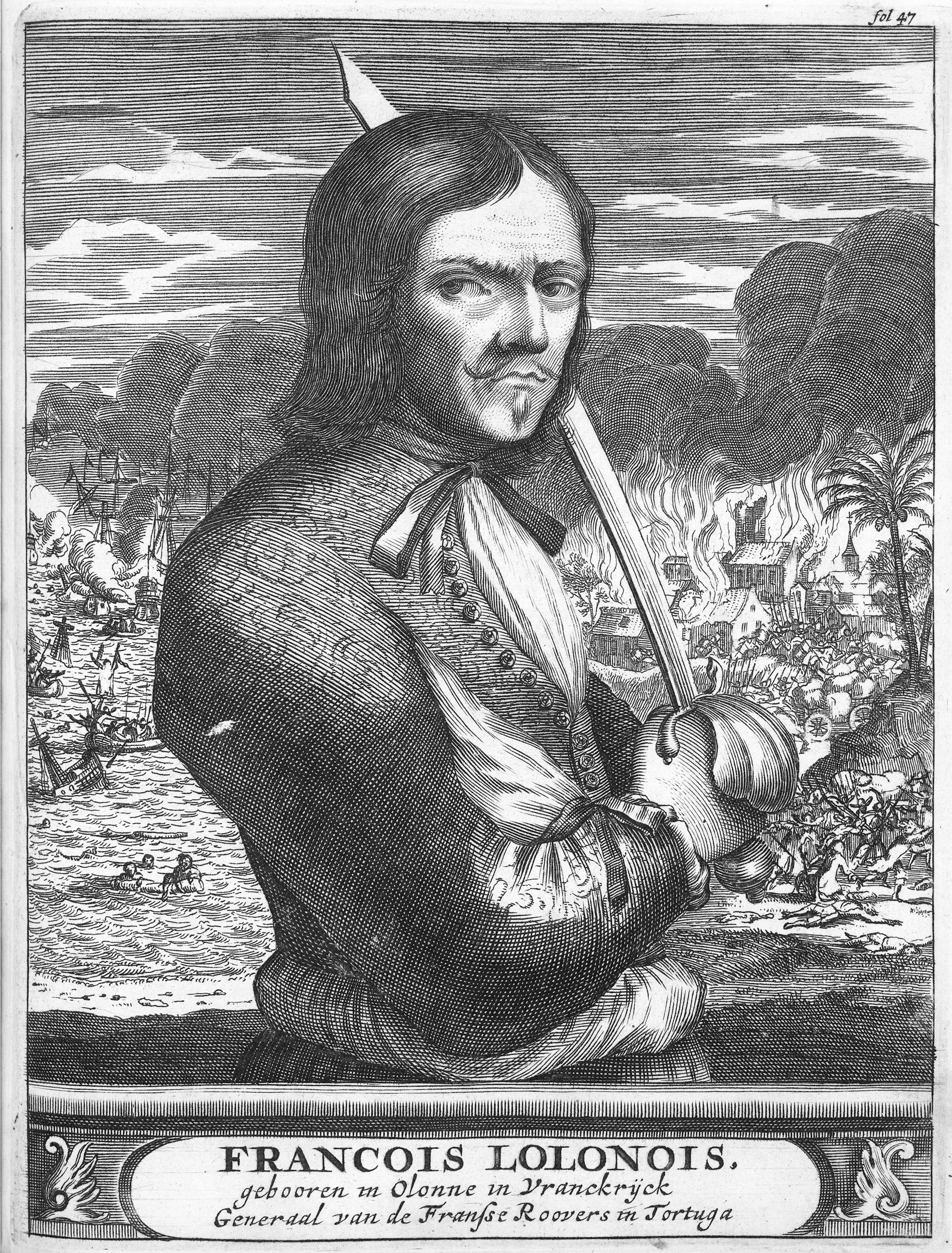
François l'Ollonais was nicknamed "Flail of the Spaniards" and had a reputation for brutality – offering no quarter to Spanish prisoners.

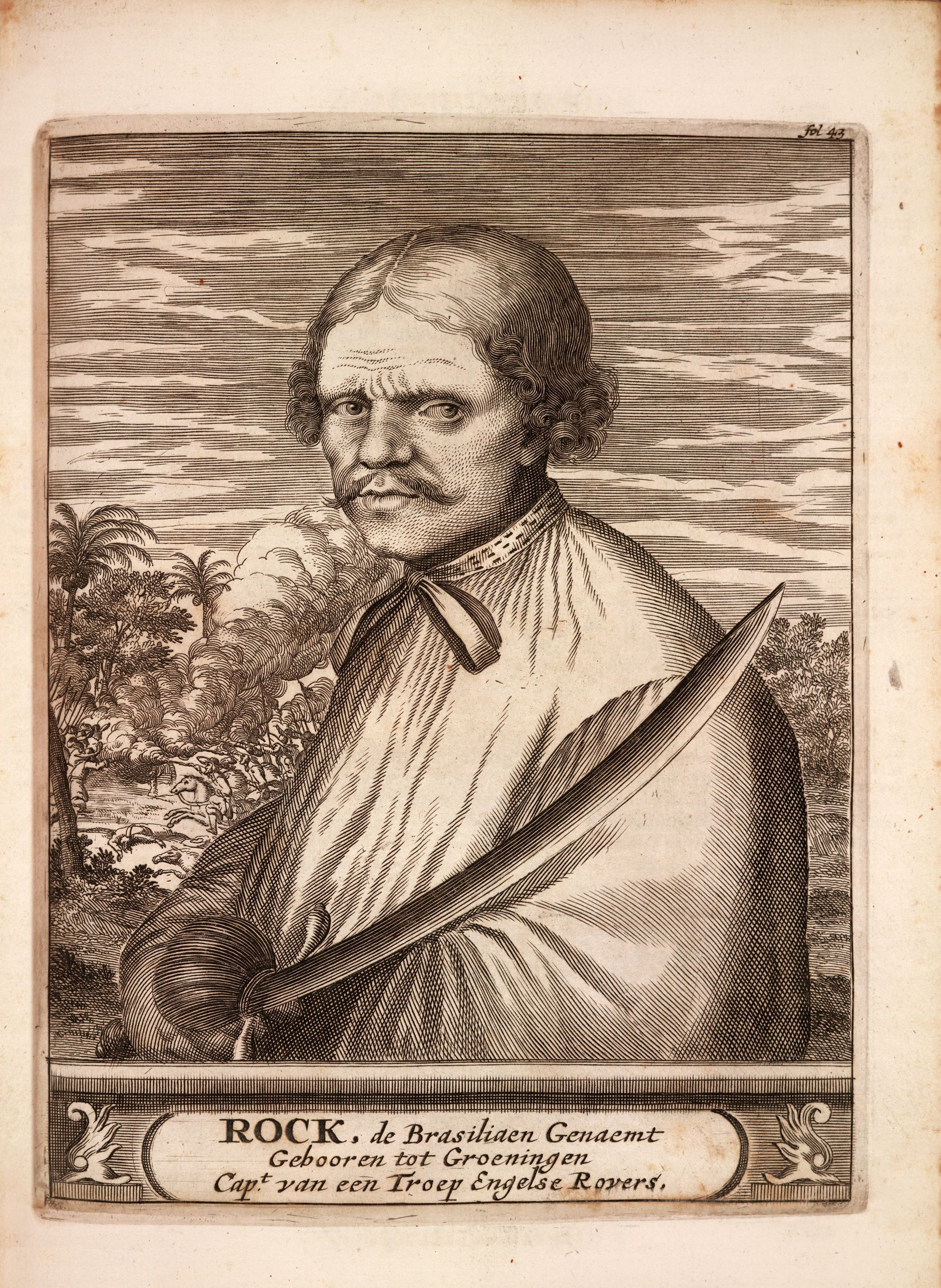
Roche Braziliano had a reputation for violence, and once roasted two Spanish farmers when they refused to hand over their pigs.

Name	Life	Years active	Country of origin	Comments
Vincenzo Alessandri	d. 1657		Italy	Originally a Knight of Malta, Alessandri was captured and enslaved.
Robert Allison	17th century	1679–1699	England	Buccaneer who attacked Puerto Bello and Panama, became a merchant captain, aided the Scottish at Darien.
Cornelius Andreson		1674–1675	Netherlands	He is best known for attacking English traders off Acadia and for serving in King Philip's War.
Michiel Andrieszoon	17th century	1680s	Netherlands	Dutch merchant-pirate. Associated with Thomas Paine and Laurens de Graff.
John Ansell	d. 1689		England	Sailed with Henry Morgan and participated in his raids against Maracaibo and Gibraltar, Venezuela.
Joseph Bannister	d. 1687	1680–1687	England	Former merchant captain who operated in the Caribbean and defeated two Royal Navy ships in battle.
Jean Bart	1651–1702	1672–1697	France	Born the son of a fisherman, Bart retired an admiral in French service.
Michel le Basque	17th century	1666–1668	France	Pirate and flibustier (French buccaneer) from the Kingdom of Navarre in the southwest of France. He is best known as a companion of François L'Olonnais, with whom he sacked Maracaibo and Gibraltar.
John Bear		1684–1689	England	English pirate active in the Caribbean who also served with the Spanish and French.
Philippe Bequel	17th century	1650–1669	France	Was one of the first foreign privateers awarded a letter of marque by the governor of Jamaica
Jacob Janssen van den Bergh	fl. 1660	1650s–1660s	Netherlands	Dutch corsair and slave trader for the Dutch West India Company.
Jean Bernanos	d. 1695	1677–1695	France	Raided Spanish settlements in Central and South America, later sailed as a privateer. Used "L'essone" as a pseudonym.
Charlotte de Berry	17th century	1660s	England	A female pirate, she later commanded her own ship. Her story first appeared in 1836 and she may have been fictional.
Lancelot Blackburne	1653–1743	1680–1684	England	Blackburne was an English clergyman, who became Archbishop of York, and – in popular belief – a pirate.
Eduardo Blomar	d. 1679	1670s	Spain	Spanish renegade active in the Spanish Main during the 1670s. Tried in absentia and convicted of piracy with Bartolomé Charpes and Juan Guartem in Panama in 1679.
George Bond	17th century	1683–1684	England	Active in the Caribbean, known for acting in league with the pirate-friendly Governor of St. Thomas, Adolph Esmit.
Pierre Bot	17th century	1680s	France	French buccaneer active in the Caribbean.
Alexandre Bras-de-Fer	17th century	mid-17th century	France	A flibustier (French buccaneer) in the latter half of the mid-17th century. He is best known for capturing a Spanish ship after being shipwrecked, though his story is possibly apocryphal.
Nicolas Brigaut	1653–1686	1679–1686	France	French pirate and buccaneer active in the Caribbean. He was closely associated with fellow corsair Michel de Grammont.
James Browne	17th century	1676–1677	Scotland	Scottish pirate and privateer active in the Caribbean. He is best known for his hasty execution and the effects it had on colonial Jamaican government.
Manuel Butiens	fl. 1645	1640s	Netherlands	Dutch renegade and Dunkirker in the service of Spain.
Jean du Casse	1646–1715	168?–1697	France	Born to Huguenot parents, du Casse was allowed to join the French navy on the value of his prizes taken while a buccaneer.
Bartolomé Charpes	d. 1679	1680s	Spain	Spanish renegade who was tried in absentia and convicted of piracy with Eduardo Blomar and Juan Guartem in Panama by Governor Don Dionicio Alceda in 1679.
Jean Charpin		1688–1689	France	French pirate and buccaneer active in the Caribbean and off the coast of Africa. He is best known for sailing alongside Jean-Baptiste du Casse as well as for his Articles, or "Pirate Code."
Nicholas Clough		1682–1683	England	Active in the Caribbean and off the coast of Africa. He is best remembered for leaving behind a well-documented Pirate Code, his "Articles of Agreement".
Edward Collier	17th century	1668–1671	England	Served as Sir Henry Morgan's second-in-command throughout much of his expeditions against Spain during the mid-17th century.
Edmund Cooke	17th century	1673–1683	England	Merchant captain, buccaneer, and pirate. He is best known for sailing against the Spanish alongside Bartholomew Sharp, John Coxon, Basil Ringrose, Lionel Wafer, and other famous buccaneers. Cooke's flag was red-and-yellow striped and featured a hand holding a sword.
John Cook	d. 1683	1680s	England	English buccaneer who led an expedition against the Spanish in the early 1680s.
John Cornelius		1687–?	Ireland	Irish pirate supposedly active in the Red Sea and off the west coast of Africa. He succeeded William Lewis, who was killed after announcing he'd made a pact with the Devil. Lewis and Cornelius are likely the fictional creations of Captain Charles Johnson, who presented their stories among those of real historical pirates.
Juan Corso	d. 1685	1680–1685	Spain	Corsican guarda costa, hunted logwood cutters, known for his brutality.
John Coxon	d. 1689	1677–1682	England	One of the most famous of the Brethren of the Coast, a loose consortium of pirates and privateers who were active on the Spanish Main.
George Cusack	d. 1675	1668–1675	Ireland	Cruised both northern Europe and the West Indies, during and after the Anglo-Dutch Wars.
William Dampier	1651–1715	1670–1688	England	Was the first person to circumnavigate the world three times.
Edward Davis	17th century	1680–1688	England	Led the last major buccaneer raid against Panama.
John Davis	18th century		England	Davis was one of the earliest and most active buccaneers on Jamaica.
Jacquotte Delahaye	17th century	1660s	France	Delahaye was a French Buccaneer, likely fictional; if real, would have been one of the very few female buccaneers.
Edward Dempster	17th century	1667–1669	England	A buccaneer and privateer active in the Caribbean. He is best known for his association with Henry Morgan.
Anne Dieu-Le-Veut	b. 1650	1650–1704	France	Was originally one of the women – "Filles de Roi" – sent by the French government to Tortuga to become wives to the local male colonists.
John Eaton	17th century	1682–1686	England	Looted Brazil and Spanish South America, crossed the Pacific, raided in East Indies, crew split up in the Indian Ocean.
Cornelius Essex	d. 1680	1670s	England	An English buccaneer who took part in Captain Bartholomew Sharp's privateering expedition, the "Pacific Adventure", during the late 1670s.
Jacob Evertson	died 1695?	1681–1688	Netherlands	He escaped Henry Morgan and sailed with Jan Willems for several years.
Alexandre Exquemelin	1645–1707	1669–1674; 1697	France	A French writer, most known as the author of one of the most important sourcebooks of 17th century piracy, De Americaensche Zee-Roovers.
Jacob Fackman	17th century	1662–1666	England	English buccaneer and pirate active in the Caribbean. He is best known for attacking the Spanish alongside Henry Morgan, John Morris, and David Marteen.
Jean Fantin		1681–1689	France	French pirate active in the Caribbean and off the coast of Africa. He is best known for having his ship stolen by William Kidd and Robert Culliford.
Philip Fitzgerald	17th century	1672–1675	Ireland	Irish pirate and privateer who served the Spanish in the Caribbean.
Jean Foccard	17th century	1680s	France	Associate of Laurens de Graaf and Michel de Grammont. He later joined them in their attack on Tampico in 1682.
Pierre Francois	17th century	mid-17th century	France	Mid-17th-century flibustier, or French buccaneer, active in the Caribbean. He is best known for a single attack on a Spanish pearl-diving fleet. His story appears only in Alexandre Exquemelin's History of the Buccaneers and the truth of his account is uncertain.
Thomas Freeman	17th century	1655–1680	England	English buccaneer and pirate active in the Caribbean. He is best known for attacking the Spanish alongside Henry Morgan, David Marteen, and John Morris.
Louis Le Golif	17th century	1660–1675	France	Known from his Memoirs; supposedly a real buccaneer active against the Spanish, Golif's Memoirs were a forgery and he is now assumed to be entirely fictional.
Laurens de Graaf	1653–1704	1672–1697	Netherlands	Also known as Lorencillo and active in the Caribbean. Characterised as "a great and mischievous pirate" by Henry Morgan, de Graaf was a Dutch pirate, mercenary, and naval officer in the service of the French colony of Saint-Domingue. Sacked Veracruz. His companion was pirate Nicholas van Hoorn.
John Graham	17th century	1683–1686	England	English pirate active off New England and the African coast. May have been a doctor as well.
Michel de Grammont	1645–1686	1670–1686	France	A French buccaneer, de Grammont primarily attacked Spanish holdings in Maracaibo, Gibraltar, Trujillo, La Guaira, Puerto Cabello, Cumana and Veracruz
Pierre le Grand	17th century		France	Known only for a single attack against a Spanish galleon, his existence is disputed.
"Red Legs" Greaves	17th century	1670s–1690?	Scotland	Greaves's nickname was based on a commonly used term for reddened legs often seen among the Scottish and Irish who took to wearing kilts in almost any weather. Noted for his raid of Margarita Island. He may have been fictional; his story first appeared in 1924.
Francois Grogniet	17th century	1683–1687	France	French buccaneer and pirate active against the Pacific coast of Spanish Central America.
Juan Guartem	17th century	1670s	Spain	A Spanish renegade pirate who raided Spanish settlements in New Spain during the late 17th century with his most notable raid being against Chepo in 1679.
Jacob Hall	17th century	1683–1684	England	Joined a buccaneer raid on Veracruz then sailed to Carolina.
Jean Hamlin	17th century	1682–1684	French	French buccaneer active in the Caribbean and off the coast of Africa. He was often associated with St. Thomas' pirate-friendly Governor Adolph Esmit.
Peter Harris	d. 1680	1670s	England	English buccaneer and member of Captain Bartholomew Sharp's "Pacific Expedition". Killed at Panama in 1680.
Richard Hawkins	1562–1622	1593–1594	England	A buccaneer and explorer who was later knighted.
Thomas Hawkins	d. 1690	1689	Unknown	Pirate briefly active off New England. He was known for sailing with Thomas Pound.
Thomas Henley		1683–1685	Colonial America	A pirate and privateer active in the Red Sea and the Caribbean.
Henry Holloway		1687	Colonial America	A pirate active off the American east coast, from South Carolina to Maine. Aided by a member of Governor James Colleton's Grand Council.
Nicholas van Hoorn	1635–1683	1663–1683	Netherlands	Merchant, privateer and later pirate, van Hoorn was hugely successful before dying of wound infection. Active in the Caribbean and based at the island Hispaniola. Sacked in 1683 Veracruz. Worked together with Laurens de Graaf aka Lorencillo.
William Jackson	17th century	1639–1645	England	It was the fleet under his command that captured Jamaica for England.
Bartholomeus de Jager	fl. 1655	1650s	Netherlands	Dutch corsair active against the Portuguese. He attacked a small merchant fleet at Fernando de Noronha, capturing one merchant ship and driving off the other.
Daniel Johnson	1629–1675	1657–1675	England	Became known as "Johnson the Terror" among the Spanish.
Peter Johnson	d. 1672	1661–1672	Netherlands	Dutch pirate, raided off Havana, put to trial twice and confessed before his execution.
William Knight	17th century	1684–1686	England	Along with Edward Davis, he took part in the final large buccaneer attack on Spanish holdings.
Jean L'Escuyer	17th century	1685	France	French pirate active on the Pacific coast of Central America. He sailed and fought alongside a number of prominent buccaneers such as Edward Davis, Francois Grogniet, William Dampier, and others.
François l'Olonnais	1635–1668	1660–1668	France	Nicknamed "The Bane of Spaniards" (French: Fléau des Espagnols). l'Ollonais had a reputation for brutality, offering no quarter to Spanish prisoners. Famous by his raids against Maracaibo and Gibraltar, Venezuela.
Jelles de Lecat	17th century	1668–1674	Netherlands	Sacked Spanish territories alongside Brasiliano, Reyning, Bradley, and Morgan. Often called "Yellahs," "Yallahs," or "Captain Yellows."
William Lewis		1687–?	Unknown	Pirate supposedly active in the Caribbean, off the American east coast, and the west coast of Africa. He was known for sparing his victims, and for being killed after announcing he had made a pact with the Devil. He is likely the fictional creation of Captain Charles Johnson, who presented his story among those of real historical pirates.
Raveneau de Lussan	b. 1663	1684–1688	France	An impoverished nobleman. Attacked targets in Central America. Known for a "long march" in 1688.
Thomas Magott	17th century	1680s	England	English buccaneer who sailed with Bartholomew Sharp and others on the "Pacific Adventure".
Marquis de Maintenon	1648–1691	1672–1676	France	A French nobleman who became a buccaneer in the Caribbean, selling his castle and title to Madame de Maintenon. Remarkable for his raid of Margarita Island.
Edward Mansvelt / Mansfield	d. 1666	1650s–1660s	Curaçao	Dutch buccaneer in English service. Known as the Admiral of the "Brethren of the Coast", Mansvelt was a mentor to Sir Henry Morgan who succeeded him following his death.
David Marteen	17th century	1663–1665	Netherlands	Known primarily as the sole non-English Captain who participated in the raids against Spanish strongholds in present-day Mexico and Nicaragua.
Montbars the Exterminator	1645–1701?	1660s–1670s	France	A former French naval officer and gentleman adventurer, he engaged in a violent and destructive war against Spain in the Caribbean and the Spanish Main. His hatred of the Spanish earned him the name "Montbars the Exterminator".
Sir Henry Morgan	1635–1688	1663–1674	Wales	A privateer who later retired to become Lieutenant Governor of Jamaica. he participated in his raids against Panama, Maracaibo, Gibraltar, Porto Bello.
John Morris	17th century	1663–1672	England	A skilled pilot, he served with both Christopher Myngs and Henry Morgan before becoming a pirate hunter.
Sir Christopher Myngs	1625–1666	1650s–1660s	England	Described as "unhinged and out of tune" by the governor of Jamaica, Myngs nevertheless became a Vice-Admiral of the Blue in the Royal Navy. In 1658, raided the coast of South-America; failing to capture a Spanish treasure fleet, he destroyed Tolú and Santa Marta in present-day Colombia instead. In 1659, he plundered Cumaná, Puerto Cabello and Coro in present-day Venezuela.
Edward Neville	17th century	1675–1678	England	Privateer, joined a buccaneer raid on Campeche then sailed to Jamaica.
Thomas Paine	17th century	1680s	England	A colonial American privateer who raided several settlements in the West Indies with Jan Willems, most notably against Rio de la Hacha in 1680. He also drove the French from Block Island.
Manuel Ribeiro Pardal	d. 1671	1668–1671	Portugal	Portuguese privateer in the service of Spain. One of the few successful privateers active against the buccaneers of the Caribbean during the late 17th century.
George Peterson	17th century	1686–1688	England	Part of his crew consisted of the remnants of the crews of Jean Hamlin and two recently deceased pirates, Jan "Yankey" Willems and Jacob Evertson.
Pierre Le Picard	fl. 1666–1690	1660s–1690s	France	An officer under l'Ollonais and Henry Morgan, he and Moise Vauquelin left to pursue a career on their own. He later served in King William's War. He may have been one of the first buccaneers to raid shipping on both the Caribbean and Pacific coasts.
Chevalier du Plessis	d. 1668	1660s	France	French privateer active in the West Indies. He was succeeded by Moise Vauquelin following his death.
Baron Jean de Pointis	1635–1707	1690s	France	His greatest venture was the 1697 Raid of Cartagena.
Bartolomeu Português	b. 1630	1666–1669	Portugal	One of the earliest pirates to use a pirate code.
Thomas Pound	d. 1703	1689	England	Briefly commanded a small ship near Massachusetts before being captured.
Lawrence Prince	fl. 1659–1672	1650s–1670s	Netherlands	Dutch buccaneer in English service. An officer under Sir Henry Morgan, he and John Morris led the vanguard at Panama in 1671.
Philip Ras	fl. 1652–1655	1650s	Netherlands	Captured several English ships as both a corsair and privateer during the First Anglo-Dutch War.
Stenka Razin	1630–1671		Russia	A Cossack pirate who operated on the Volga and later expanded into the Caspian Sea.
John Read (pirate)	?	1683-1688	England	English buccaneer, privateer, and pirate active from South America to the East Indies to the Indian Ocean.
Peter Roderigo		1674–1675	Netherlands	He is best known for attacking English traders off Acadia and for serving in King Philip's War.
Jean Rose	17th century	1680–1688	France	Raided Spanish settlements in Central and South America, including Panama, used Tortuga as a base.
Richard Sawkins	d. 1680	1679–1680	England	Participated, along with John Coxon and Bartholomew Sharp, in the surprise attack on Santa Maria in Panama.
Lewis Scot	fl. 1663	1660s	England	Known for his attack on the city of Campeche, on the Yucatan Peninsula.
Robert Searle	17th Century	1660s	England	Jamaican-based buccaneer known for his sacks of Tobago and St. Augustine, Florida and occasional compatriot of Henry Morgan.
Bartholomew Sharp	1650–1690	1679–1682	England	Plundered 25 Spanish ships and numerous small towns.
Gustav Skytte	1637–1663	1657–1663	Sweden	Attacked ships in the Baltic Sea, along with other accomplices of noble descent.
Bernard Claesen Speirdyke	fl. 1663–1670	1660s–1670s	Netherlands	Dutch buccaneer active in the Caribbean, he was captured by Captain Manuel Ribeiro Pardal near Cuba and later executed.
George Spurre	17th century	1678–1683	England	Privateer, joined a buccaneer raid on Veracruz then sailed to Saint-Domingue.
Charles Swan	17th century		England	A reluctant pirate, he begged for a pardon even as he looted his way around South America.
Jacques Tavernier / Le Lyonnais	1625–1673	1664–1673	France	French buccaneer who took part in expeditions with Laurens de Graaf, Michel de Grammont, Pierre le Grand, François l'Ollonais and Sir Henry Morgan before his execution in 1673. His existence is disputed as the only pre-20th century reference to him appears in Appleton's Cyclopedia of American Biography.
Francis Townley	d. 1686	1685–1686	England	Raided Nicaragua, sacked Panama, held Spanish hostages to extort ransom.
Jean Tristan	d. 1693	1681–1693	France	Attacked Costa Rica and Colombia, joined a raid on Veracruz, became an English subject.
Moïse Vauquelin / Moses Vanclein	fl. 1650–1672	1650s–1670s	France	An officer under l'Ollonais, he also had a partnership with Pierre le Picard. In his later years, he wrote a book detailing the coastline of Honduras and the Yucatan along with fellow buccaneer Philippe Bequel.
Captain Veale	17th century	1685	England	Attacked ships along New England from Virginia to Boston with pirate John Graham.
Thomas Veale	17th century	mid-1600s	England	Known for legends of his buried treasure.
Cornelis Janszoon van de Velde	fl. 1655	1650s	Netherlands	Dutch corsair active near the Antillen, he was briefly associated with Bartholomeus de Jager.
Lionel Wafer	1640–1705	1679–1688	Wales	An explorer whose work helped inspire the Darien Scheme.
Janke / Yankey Willems	fl. 1681–1687	1680s	Netherlands	Dutch buccaneer active in the Caribbean.
Francis Witherborn	17th century	1670–1672	England	English buccaneer, privateer, and pirate active in the Caribbean. He is best known for his brief association with Henry Morgan.
Thomas Woolerly		1683–1687	Colonial America	A pirate and privateer active in the Caribbean and the Indian Ocean.
William Wright	17th century	1675–1682	England	Despite being English, Wright was active as a privateer under a French commission. He later became a buccaneer.

== Golden Age of Piracy: 1690–1730 ==
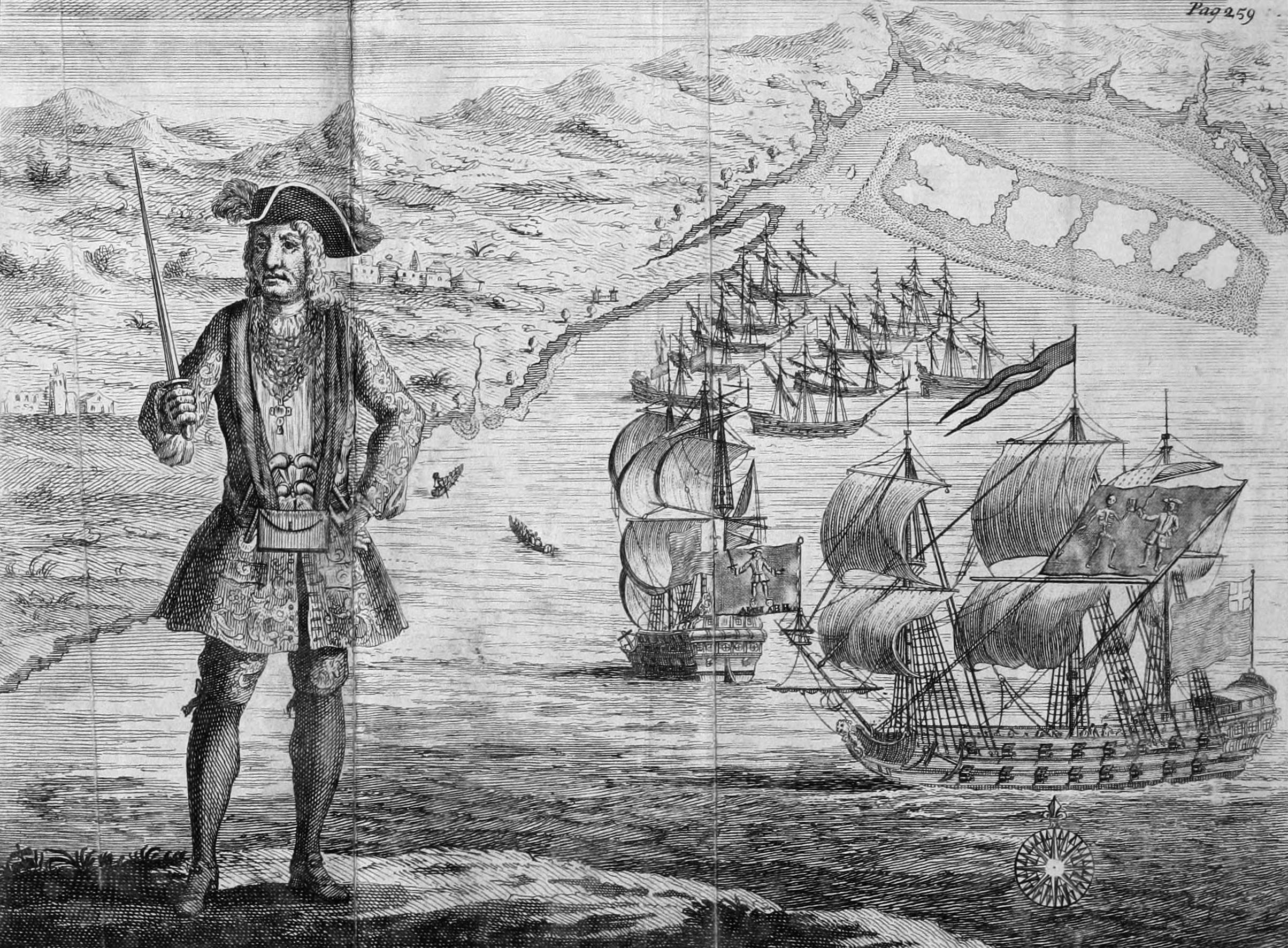
The most successful pirate of the Golden Age of Piracy, Bartholomew Roberts was estimated to have captured more than 470 vessels.

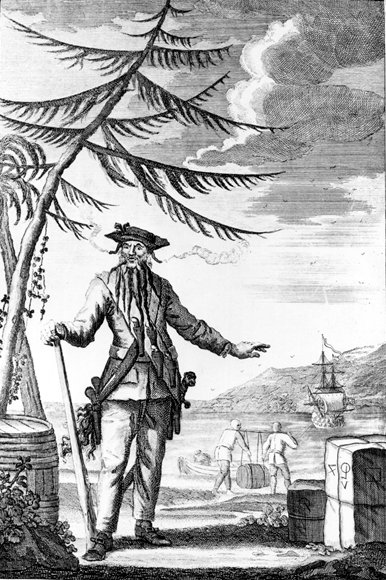
With his fearsome appearance, Blackbeard is often credited with the creation of the stereotypical image of a pirate.

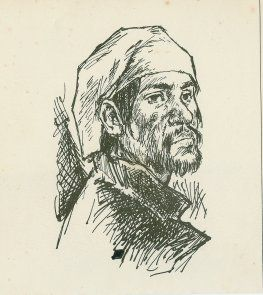
Miguel Enríquez was the most longeve and the wealthiest of the privateers born in the Caribbean colonies.

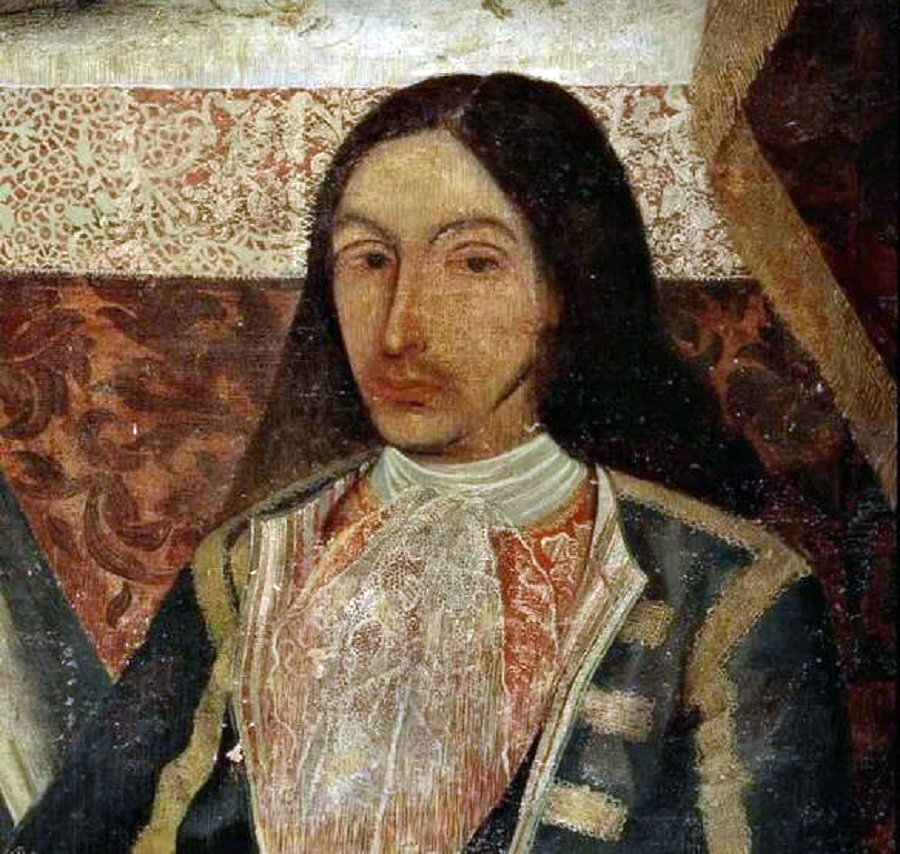
Amaro Pargo. He was one of the most famous pirates of the golden age of piracy, and one of the most important personalities of the 18th century of Spain.

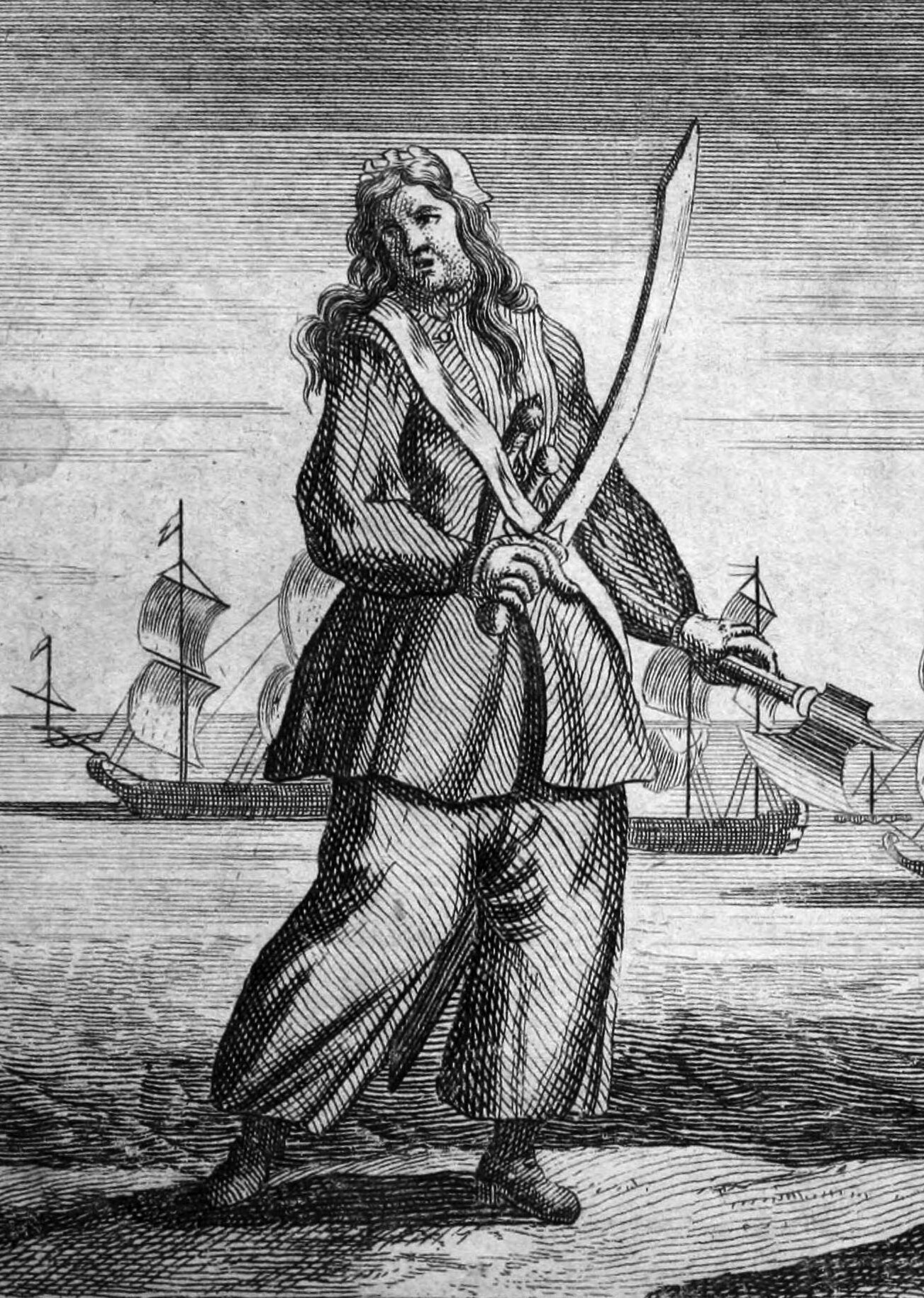
Despite never commanding a ship herself, Anne Bonny is remembered as one of few known female pirates.

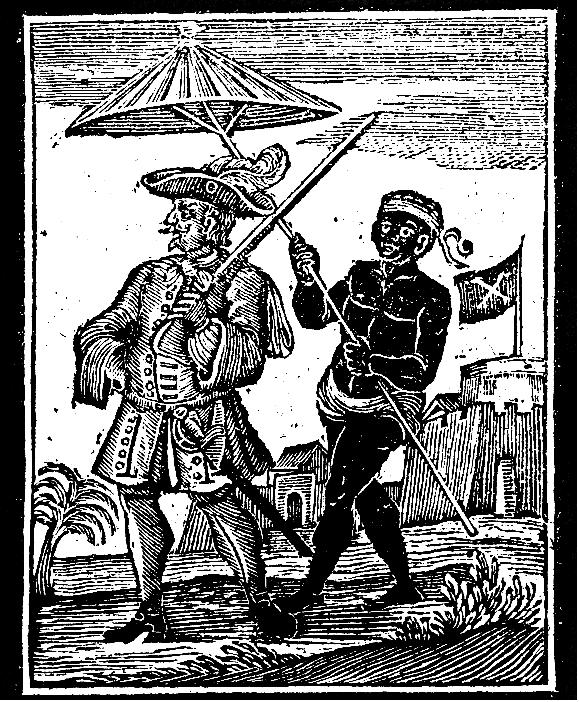
Henry Every (or Avery) is famous as one of the few pirates of the era who was able to retire with his takings without being either arrested or killed in battle.

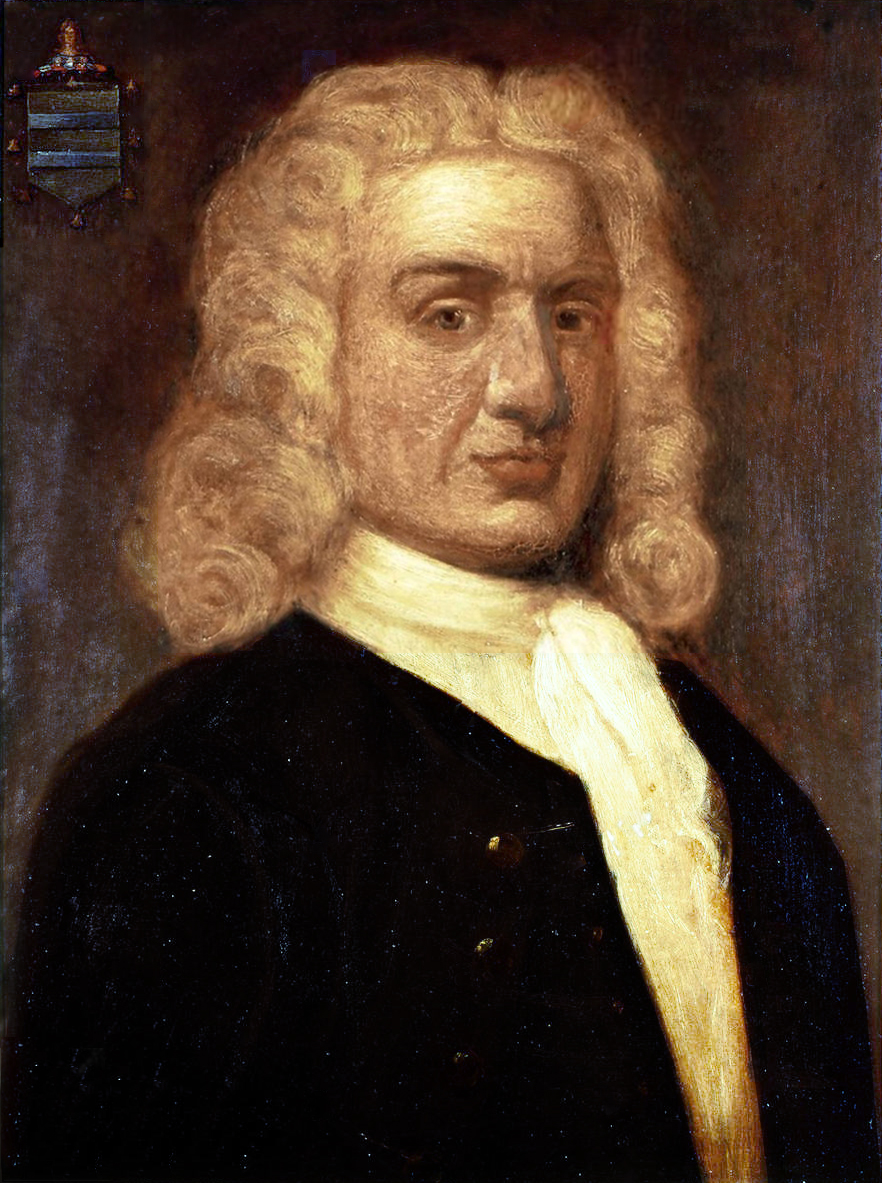
Although modern historians dispute the legitimacy of his trial and execution, the rumour of Captain Kidd's buried treasure has served only to build a legend around the man as a great pirate.

Name	Life	Years active	Country of origin	Comments
Capt. Edmond Du Chastel James Allison	1662-1713 ?	1680-1713 1689–1691	France-United states Colonial America	Capt. Edmond Chastel was active during Queen annes war and sailed up and down the east coast into the tropical islands & active around charlestón SC. He was commissioned to command a sloop called the “Resolution” during Queen Annes war & he was a privateer and had warrant for being a pirate around Philadelphia. Active near Cape Verde and the Bay of Campeche. Almost the entire record of Allison's piracy comes from trial records of a single incident, the seizure of the merchantman Good Hope.
Thomas Anstis	d. 1723	1718–1723	England	Was mainly active in the Caribbean, and served under first Howell Davis and later Bartholomew Roberts.
Leigh Ashworth	?	1716–1719	Unknown	A pirate and privateer operating in the Caribbean in the early 1700s.
John Auger	1678–1718	1718	Unknown	Active in the Bahamas around 1718. He is primarily remembered for being captured by pirate turned pirate-hunter Benjamin Hornigold.
Adam Baldridge	?	fl. c. 1685–1697	England	English pirate and one of the early founders of the pirate settlements in Madagascar.
Jonathan Barnet	?	1715–1720	England	English privateer active in the Caribbean. He is best known for capturing pirates John Rackham, Anne Bonny, and Mary Read.
Thomas Barrow	d. 1726	1702–1718	Unknown	Pirate active in the Caribbean. He is best known for proclaiming himself Governor of New Providence.
Don Benito	?	1725	Spain	Real name possibly Benito Socarras Y Aguero, he was a Spanish pirate and guarda costa privateer active in the Caribbean.
Charles Bellamy	?	1717–1720	England	English pirate who raided colonial American shipping in New England and later off the coast of Canada. He is often confused with the more well-known Samuel Bellamy, as they operated in the same areas at the same time.
Samuel Bellamy	1689–1717	1716–1717	Hittisleigh, Devonshire, England	Despite having a career of only 16 months, Bellamy was extraordinarily successful, capturing more than 50 ships before his death at age 28. His acquired wealth of five tons of treasure from his short career is speculated at US$120 million in 2008 dollars. Bellamy began his pirate career under the command of Henry Jennings, a Buccaneer that turned pirate; but double-crossing Jennings, Bellamy fled to the Bahamas and joined Jennings' nemesis, Benjamin Hornigold of the Mary Anne. But quickly growing wearisome of Hornigold's refusal to attack English ships, Bellamy called for a vote of no confidence, and the crew ousted Hornigold and Blackbeard by a majority vote, electing Bellamy as captain. Bellamy's prize flagship, Whydah Galley, discovered by underwater explorer Barry Clifford in 1984, is currently the world's only fully authenticated Golden Age pirate shipwreck ever found.
Blackbeard (Edward Teach)	1680–1718	1716–1718	England	With his fearsome appearance, Blackbeard is often credited with the creation of the stereotypical image of a pirate. Although his real name remains unknown, he began his pirate career as the first officer of Buccaneer-turned-pirate Captain Benjamin Hornigold of the Mary Anne. When a young crewman, Samuel Bellamy, called for a vote of no confidence in Hornigold for his refusal to attack English ships, the crew by a vote ousted Hornigold and Blackbeard, leaving the Mary Anne to Bellamy whom the crew elected their new captain. His legend solidified after he took command of the Queen Anne's Revenge.
Black Caesar	d. 1718	1700s–1718	Africa	A captured slave turned pirate, legend held that Black Caesar had been a well-known pirate active off the Florida Keys during the early 18th century. Historically, he was part of Blackbeard's crew and was one of five Africans serving on his flagship.
Augustin Blanco	?	1700–1725	Cuba	He was noted for attacking in open boats, and for having a mixed-race crew.
Richard Bobbington	d. 1697	1695–1696	Unknown	Active in the Red Sea, Indian Ocean, and Persian Gulf. Sailed with Thomas Tew's crew after Tew's death. One of several captains of the Charming Mary.
Jean Bonadvis	?	1717–1720	France	He is best known for his involvement with Benjamin Hornigold.
Stede Bonnet	1688–1718	1717–1718	Barbados	Nicknamed "The Gentleman Pirate", Bonnet was born into a wealthy family before turning to piracy.
Anne Bonny	d. 1733	1720	Unknown	Despite never commanding a ship herself, Anne Bonny is remembered as one of few known female pirates.
George Booth	d. 1700	1696–1700	England	One of the earliest pirates active in the Indian Ocean and Red Sea.
John Bowen	d. 1704	1700–1704	Bermuda	Was active in the Indian Ocean, his contemporaries included George Booth and Nathaniel North.
Joseph Bradish	d. 1700	1698–1700	Unknown	A pirate best known for a single incident involving a mutiny.
John Breholt	17th–18th centuries	1697–1711	England	Pirate and salvager active in the Caribbean, the Carolinas, and the Azores. He is best known for organizing several attempts to get the pirates of Madagascar to accept a pardon and bring their wealth home to England.
Nicholas Brown	d. 1726	to 1726	England	Active off the coast of Jamaica, Brown was eventually killed – and his head pickled – by childhood friend John Drudge.
Phineas Bunce	d. 1718	1717–1718	Unknown	Pirate active in the Caribbean. He was pardoned for piracy but reverted to it immediately afterwards and was killed by a Spanish pirate hunter.
Nathaniel Burches	?	1705–1707	Unknown	A privateer who operated out of New England. He was known for sailing alongside Regnier Tongrelow and Thomas Penniston, and for single-handedly defeating a huge Spanish ship.
Josiah ("Thomas") Burgess	1689–1719	1716–1719	England	He is best known as one of the heads of New Providence's "Flying Gang."
Samuel Burgess	1650–1716	1690–1708	England	Member of Captain William Kidd's crew in 1690 when the Blessed William was seized by Robert Culliford and some of the crew.
William Burke	d. 1699	1699	Ireland	Pirate and trader active in the Caribbean and near Newfoundland, best known for aiding William Kidd.
James Carnegie	?	1716	Unknown	Sailed in consort with Henry Jennings.
Canoot	?	1698	France	French pirate active off the coast of New England.
Dirk Chivers	early 18th century	1694–1699	Netherlands	Active in the Red Sea and Indian Ocean, Chivers later retired from piracy and returned to the Netherlands.
Adrian Claver	?	1704–1705	Netherlands	A Dutch privateer based out of New England. He sailed alongside other prominent privateers such as John Halsey, Regnier Tongrelow, and Thomas Penniston.
Edward Coates	?	1689–1694	Colonial America	A colonial American privateer in English service during the King William's War and later a pirate operating in the Red Sea and Indian Ocean during the mid-1690s.
Thomas Cocklyn	early 18th century	1717 to death	England	Primarily known for his association with Howell Davis and Oliver La Buze, Cocklyn's activities after 1719 are unknown.
John Cockram	?	1713–1718	England	Pirate, trader, and pirate hunter in the Caribbean, best known for his association with Benjamin Hornigold.
John Cole	d. 1718	1718	England	Associated with Richard Worley and William Moody. He is known more for the unusual cargo of his pirate ship than for his piracy.
Robert Colley	d. 1698	1695–1698	Colonial America	An American pirate active near Newfoundland and the Indian Ocean.
Thomas Collins	d. 1719	1690s–1719	Unknown	Active in the Indian Ocean. He is best known for leading a pirate settlement and trading post on Madagascar.
Christopher Condent	d. 1734	1718–1720	England	After entering into piracy in 1718, Condent later took a prize of £150,000 with his ship Fiery Dragon and retired to France, becoming a wealthy merchant. Known by many names, including Condent, Congdon, Connor or Condell; and by given names including William, Christopher, Edmond or John.
Joseph Cooper	d. 1725	1718–1725	Colonial America	Active in the Caribbean and the American East Coast. He was best known for sailing alongside Francis Spriggs, and for the manner of his death.
William Cotter	b.1670 d.1702	1690–1692	England	He was mainly active in Jamaica and the Red Sea sailing under George Raynor.
William Coward	?	1689–1690	Unknown	A minor pirate active off the coast of Massachusetts. He is known for a single incident involving the seizure of one small vessel, largely thanks to events surrounding his trial.
Captain Crapo	18th century	1704–1708	France	French privateer active in the Caribbean and off the American east coast during the War of Spanish Succession. He was highly successful, capturing a large number of English vessels which he sent back to his home ports in Martinique and Port Royal.
Mary Critchett	?	1729	Colonial America	She is best known for being one of only four female pirates from the Golden Age of Piracy.
Robert Culliford	Early 18th century	1690–1698	England	The former first mate of William Kidd, Culliford led a first mutiny against Kidd, stealing his ship Blessed William. One of the few pirates documented as participating in matelotage, with John Swann.
Alexander Dalzeel	1662–1715	1685–1715	Scotland	Served under Henry Every. Was captured four times before finally being hanged.
Howell Davis	1690–1719	1718–1719	Wales	Having a career that lasted only 11 months, Davis was ambushed during an attempt to kidnap the governor of Príncipe.
Captain Davy	early 18th century	1704–1705	France	French privateer active off New England during Queen Anne's War. He is best known for repeatedly evading capture by rival English and Dutch privateers such as Adrian Claver and Thomas Penniston.
Thomas Day	?	1697	Unknown	Pirate and privateer active off the American East Coast. He is known for being one cause of increasing tensions between the Governors of Maryland and Pennsylvania.
Robert Deal	d. 1721	1718–1721	England	He is best known for his association with Charles Vane.
Nicholas de Concepcion	?	1720	Unknown	Pirate active off the New England coast. An escaped slave, he was one of the few black or mulatto pirate captains.
Mathurin Desmarestz	1653–1700	1685–1697	France	French pirate and buccaneer active in the Caribbean, the Pacific, and the Indian Ocean.
Étienne de Montauban	?	1691–1695	France	French flibustier (buccaneer), privateer, and pirate active in the Caribbean and off the west African coast. Frequently referred to as Sieur de Montauban (last name occasionally Montauband), he wrote an account of his later voyages, including surviving a shipwreck.
Francis Demont	?	1716–1717	Colonial America	Pirate active in the Caribbean. His trial was important in establishing Admiralty law in South Carolina.
John Derdrake	?	Early 1700s	Denmark	Known as "Jack of the Baltic." Danish pirate active in the 1700s. His story, if true, makes him one of the few pirates known to force his victims walk the plank.
George Dew	1666–1703	1686–1695	England	He once sailed alongside William Kidd and Thomas Tew, and his career took him from Newfoundland to the Caribbean to the coast of Africa.
Jean Thomas Dulaien	?	1727-1728	France	French pirate active in the Caribbean. He is known for preserved copies of his Articles and black flag.
Edward England	1690–1720	1717–1720	Ireland	Differing from many other pirates of his day, England did not kill captives unless necessary.
John Evans	d. 1723	1722–1723	Wales	After an unsuccessful career as a legitimate sailor, Evans turned to piracy – initially raiding houses from a small canoe.
Henry Every (Avery)	?	1694–1695	England	Famous as one of the few pirates of the era who was able to retire with his takings without being either arrested or killed in battle.
Mary Farley, alias Mary / Martha Farlee / Harley / Harvey		1725–1726	Irish	In 1725, Mary Harvey and her husband Thomas were transported to the Province of Carolina as felons. In 1726, Mary and three men were tried for piracy. Two of the men were hanged (their leader John Vidal was convicted and later pardoned), but Mary was released. Her husband Thomas was never caught.
Joseph Faro	?	1694–1696	Colonial America	Active in the Indian Ocean. He is best known for sailing alongside Thomas Tew to join Henry Every's pirate fleet which captured and looted the fabulously rich Mughal ship Gunsway.
John Fenn	d. 1723	to 1723	England	Sailed with Bartholomew Roberts and, later, Thomas Anstis.
Lewis Ferdinando	?	1699–1700	Unknown	Active near Bermuda during the Golden Age of Piracy.
Francis Fernando	?	1715–1716	Jamaica	Jamaican pirate and privateer active in the Caribbean. He was one of the few confirmed mixed-race captains in the Golden Age of Piracy.
James Fife	d. 1718	1718	Unknown	Active in the Caribbean. Murdered by forced men on his crew.
William Fly	d. 1726	to 1726	England	Raided off the New England coast before being captured and hanged at Boston, Massachusetts.
William Fox	?	1718–1723	Unknown	Pirate active in the Caribbean and off the African coast. He was indirectly associated with a number of more prominent pirates such as Bartholomew Roberts, Edward England, and Richard Taylor.
Richard Frowd	?	1718–1719	England	He is best known for sailing with William Moody. He was one of a number of pirates to have both white and black sailors in his crew.
Ingela Gathenhielm	1692–1729	1718–1721	Sweden	Widow of Lars Gathenhielm, active on the Baltic Sea.
Lars Gathenhielm	1689–1718	1710–1718	Sweden	Active on the Baltic Sea
Captain Gincks	?	1705–1706	Unknown	A privateer based in New York. He is best known for sailing alongside Adrian Claver, and for a violent incident involving his sailors while ashore.
Richard Glover	d. 1698	1694–1698	Colonial America	A pirate and slave trader active in the Caribbean and the Red Sea in the late 1690s.
Robert Glover	d. 1698	1693–1698	Ireland / Colonial America	An Irish-American pirate active in the Red Sea area in the late 1690s.
Christopher Goffe	?	1683–1691	Colonial America	A pirate and privateer active in the Red Sea and the Caribbean. He was eventually trusted to hunt down his former comrades.
John Golden	d. 1698	1696–1698	England	A Jacobite pirate and privateer active in the waters near England and France. His trial was important in establishing Admiralty law, differentiating between privateers and pirates, and ending the naval ambitions of the deposed James II.
Thomas Goldsmith	d. 1714	1714	England	Chiefly remembered not for his piracy but for retiring and dying peacefully in his bed, and for his gravestone inscription.
Thomas Griffin (pirate)	?	1691	Colonial America	A pirate and privateer active off New England. He is known for his association with George Dew.
Captain Grinnaway	?	1718	Unknown	A pirate from Bermuda, best known for being briefly and indirectly involved with Edward Teach (or Thatch, alias Blackbeard).
Nathaniel Grubing	17th century	1692–1697	England	English pirate who sailed in service to the French. He is best known for leading several raids on Jamaica before his capture.
Jean Baptiste Guedry	d. 1726	1726	Acadia	Took over a small ship off Acadia and was tried for piracy. The trial was publicized to Indians as an example of English law.
Charles Harris	1698–1723	1722–1723	England	He is best known for his association with George Lowther and Edward Low.
John Halsey	d. 1708	1705–1708	Colonial America	Active in the Atlantic and Indian oceans, Halsey is remembered by Defoe as "brave in his Person, courteous to all his Prisoners, lived beloved, and died regretted by his own People."
John Ham (pirate)	?	1699-1720	England	Pirate and privateer operating in the Caribbean in the early 18th century. He is best known for his involvement with Samuel Bellamy, Paulsgrave Williams, John Rackham, and the female pirates Anne Bonny and Mary Read.
Israel Hands	?	1700s–1718	Colonial America	Also known as Basilica Hands. He is best known for being second in command to Edward Teach, better known as Blackbeard. Hands' first historical mention was in 1718, when Blackbeard gave him command of David Herriot's ship Adventure after Herriot was captured by Teach in March 1718.
Don Miguel Enríquez (Henríquez)	1674–1743	1701–1735	Puerto Rico	Although born a shoemaker, Enríquez was later awarded a letter of marque by Spain, going on to become knighted and gathering a fortune of over 500,000 pieces of eight. Considered the "most accomplished" of the Hispanic privateers.
David Herriot	?	1700s–1718	Jamaica	Captain of the Jamaican sloop Adventure, captured by Edward Teach, alias Blackbeard, in 1718. He joined Blackbeard's crew, and later when Stede Bonnet separated from Blackbeard, Herriot became his sailing master. During the Battle of Cape Fear River Herriott was taken by Col. Rhet, of the sloop Royal James, on September 27, 1718. Herriot and boatswain, Ignatius Pell, turned King's evidence at their trial but escaped their Charleston prison on October 25. Herriot was shot and killed on Sullivan Island a few days later.
John Hoar	d. 1697	1694–1697	Colonial America	A pirate and privateer active in the late 1690s in the Red Sea area.
Benjamin Hornigold	1680–1719	1717–1719	England	Known for being less aggressive than other pirates, Hornigold once captured a ship for the sole purpose of seizing the crew's hats.
Thomas Howard	early 18th century	1698–1703	England	Howard served under both George Booth and John Bowen and later commanded the Prosperous.
Samuel Inless	?	1698–1699	Unknown	Active in the Indian Ocean, best known for serving as Captain over Nathaniel North and George Booth.
John Ireland	?	1694–1701	Colonial America	A pirate active in the Indian Ocean. He is best known for sailing with Thomas Tew. One of several captains of the Charming Mary.
John James	?	1699–1700	Wales	A Welsh pirate active near Madagascar, Nassau, and the American east coast.
Henry Jennings	d. 1745	1715	England	Jennings was a later governor of the pirate haven of New Providence. Although the Governor of Jamaica personally commissioned Jennings' privateering in 1715, after Jennings' began attacking salvage camps and Spanish, English and French vessels, Jennings was declared a pirate in April 1716. Jennings and his fleet of pirates and privateers subsequently moved to Nassau. Jennings was one of 400 pirates who took advantage of the British amnesty in 1718, and afterwards retired to Bermuda to live the rest of his life "as a wealthy, respected member of society."
Henry Johnson	?	1730	Ireland	Irish pirate active in the Caribbean. He shared captaincy with a Spaniard, Pedro Poleas. Johnson was best known thanks to an autobiography written by a sailor he captured and marooned.
Evan Jones	?	1698–1699	Wales	Welsh-born pirate from New York active in the Indian Ocean, best known for his indirect connection to Robert Culliford and for capturing a future Mayor of New York.
John Julian	d. 1733	1716–1717	Miskito origins	Recorded as the first black pirate to operate in the New World.
James Kelly (James Gilliam)	d. 1701	to 1699	England	Active in the Indian Ocean, Kelly was a long-time associate of William Kidd.
William "Captain" Kidd	1645–1701	1695–1699	Scotland	Although modern historians dispute the legitimacy of his trial and execution, the rumor of Captain Kidd's buried treasure has served only to build a legend around the man as a great pirate. His property was claimed by the crown and given to the Royal Hospital, Greenwich, by Queen Anne.
Henry King (pirate)	?	1700	Unknown	He is best known for attacking the slave ship John Hopewell, whose captured crew turned the tables and took his ship from him.
John King (pirate)	c. 1706/9–1717	1716–1717	England	Although not ever a captain, King joined the crew of Samuel Bellamy when they boarded the ship he was on, and is one of the youngest known pirates on record. His age is disputed at anywhere from 8–11 years.
Montigny la Palisse	?	1720–1721	France	Sailed in consort with Bartholomew Roberts.
Robert Lane	d. 1719	1719	Unknown	Was given command of a prize ship by Edward England, which was lost off Brazil with all hands.
Thomas Larimore	?	1677–1706	Colonial America	Active in the Caribbean and off the eastern seaboard of the American colonies. After helping suppress Bacon's Rebellion and serving as a militia leader he turned to piracy, operating alongside John Quelch.
Peter Lawrence	?	1693–1705	Netherlands	Dutch pirate and privateer active off New England and Newfoundland, and in the Caribbean. His and other pirates' dealings with Rhode Island's governors nearly led to the colony losing its charter.
John Leadstone / "Old Captain Crackers"	?	1704–1721	Unknown	A pirate and slave trader active off the west coast of Africa. Often called "Captain Crackers" or "Old Captain Cracker," he is best known for his actions against the English Royal African Company and for his brief involvement with Bartholomew Roberts.
Francois Le Sage	d. 1694	1682–1694	France or Netherlands	Pirate and buccaneer active in the Caribbean and off the coast of Africa. He is primarily associated with fellow buccaneers Michiel Andrieszoon and Laurens de Graaf.
Francis Leslie (pirate)	?	1717–1718	England	He is best known as one of the leaders of the "Flying Gang" of pirates operating out of New Providence.
Olivier Levasseur (Oliver La Buse)	1688–1730	1716–1730	France	Nicknamed "la Buse" (the Buzzard) for the speed with which he attacked his targets, Levasseur left behind a cryptic message that has yet to be deciphered fully today.
Samuel Liddell	?	1716	Unknown	A pirate, privateer, and merchant active in the Caribbean. He is best known for sailing alongside Henry Jennings.
Edward "Ned" Low	1690–1724	1721–1724	England	A pirate known for his vicious torture, his methods were described as having "done credit to the ingenuity of the Spanish Inquisition in its darkest days".
George Lowther	d. 1723	to 1723	England	Active in the Caribbean and the Atlantic, one of Lowther's lieutenants included Edward Low.
Matthew Luke (Matteo Luca)	d. 1722	1722	Italy	A pirate and Spanish Guarda Costa active in the Caribbean.
Philip Lyne	d. 1726	1725–1726	Unknown	Known for his cruelty and his association with Francis Spriggs.
Duncan Mackintosh	d.1689	1686-1689	England	Pirate who cruised the East Indies, the Indian Ocean, and the coast of Africa, Captain to some of William Dampier's former crew.
John Martel	?	1716–1718	England	English pirate active in the Caribbean.
Simon Mascarino	?	1701–1721	Portugal	A Portuguese pirate active in the Caribbean. He was also a privateer in service of the Spanish.
John Massey (pirate)	d.1723	1708-1723	England	Royal African Company military officer. He is best known for leaving his post in Gambia along with his soldiers to sail with pirate George Lowther.
William May	?	1689–1700	Unknown	Active in the Indian Ocean. He was best known for taking over William Kidd's ship Blessed William and sailing with Henry Every.
Edward Miller	?	1718–1720	England	English pirate active in the Caribbean.
Christopher Moody	d. 1718	1713–1718	England	Active off North and South Carolina, Moody offered no quarter to captured crews, signified by his flying of a red standard. Often conflated with William Moody.
William Moody (pirate)	d. 1718	1717–1718	England	He is best known for his association with Olivier Levasseur and Thomas Cocklyn, crewmembers who succeeded him as captains in their own right. Often conflated with Christopher Moody.
Thomas Mostyn (sea captain)	?	1695-1716	England	Sea trader between Madagascar and New York, Captain to Robert Allison and Hendrick van Hoven.
Captain Napin	?	1717–1718	Unknown	A pirate active in the Caribbean and off the American east coast. He is best known for sailing alongside Benjamin Hornigold.
Thomas Nichols	?	1717–1718	Unknown	A pirate active in the Caribbean and off the American east coast. He is best known as a leader among the "Flying Gang" of pirates operating out of New Providence.
Richard Noland	?	1717–1724	Ireland	He was best known for sailing with Samuel Bellamy before working for the Spanish.
John Norcross	1688–1758	1715–1727	England	English Jacobite pirate and privateer who sailed in service to Sweden.
Nathaniel North	b. 1672	1689–1709	Bermuda	Active in the Indian Ocean and Red Sea, North served with other famous contemporaries, including John Bowen and George Booth.
Amaro Pargo	1678–1695	1703–1737	Spain	He was one of the most famous pirates of the golden age of piracy, and one of the most important personalities of the 18th century Spain.
Ignatius Pell	?	1718-1724	England	Pirate who served as boatswain to Stede Bonnet, later commanded his own vessel.
Major Penner	?	1718	Unknown	Pirate captain active in the Caribbean. Kept his title of "Major" instead of "Captain."
Thomas Penniston	d. 1706	1704–1706	Unknown	A privateer who operated out of New England. He was known for sailing alongside Adrian Claver and Regnier Tongrelow.
James Plantain	early 18th century	1725–1728	Jamaica	Plantain ruled the island of Madagascar between 1725 and 1728, primarily through fear, and was known as the "King of Ranter Bay".
Daniel Porter	?	1718–1721	Unknown	Pirate and trader active in the Caribbean. He is best known for his associations with Benjamin Hornigold and Bartholomew Roberts.
John Prie	d. 1727	1727	Unknown	A mutineer and minor pirate in the Caribbean.
John Pro	d. 1719	1690s–1719	Netherlands	Best known for leading a pirate trading post near Madagascar.
John Quelch	1666–1704	1703–1704	England	Quelch was the first person tried for piracy outside England under Admiralty Law and therefore without a jury.
John Rackham	d. 1720	1720	England	Short lived pirate best known for sailing with Anne Bonny and Mary Read.
George Raynor	1665–1743	1683–1694	Colonial America	Active in the Red Sea. Before he was briefly a pirate captain, he was a sailor on the Batchelor's Delight which circumnavigated the globe with William Dampier.
Mary Read	d. 1721	1720	England	Along with Anne Bonny, one of few known female pirates. When captured, Read escaped hanging by claiming she was pregnant, but died soon after of a fever while still in prison.
William Read	d. 1701	1701	England	Active in the Indian Ocean near Madagascar. He is best known for rescuing fellow pirate captains John Bowen and Thomas White.
Lieutenant Richards (pirate)	?	1718	Unknown	Active in the Caribbean and off the Carolinas. He is best known for sailing alongside Blackbeard (Edward Teach / Thatch).
John Rivers (pirate)	d. 1719	1686–1719	England	A pirate best known for leading a settlement and trading post on Madagascar.
Bartholemew Roberts ("Black Bart")	1682–1722	1719–1722	Wales	The most successful pirate of the Golden Age of Piracy, estimated to have captured more than 470 vessels.
Philip Roche (pirate)	1693–1723	1721	Ireland	Active in the seas of northern Europe, best known for murdering the crews and captains of ships he and his men took over.
Tempest Rogers	1672–1704	1693–1699	England	A pirate trader active in the Caribbean and off Madagascar. He is best known for his association with William Kidd.
Woodes Rogers	1679–1732	1709–1710	England	Played a major role in the suppression of pirates in the Caribbean.
John Russell	18th century	1722–1723	Unknown	Pirate active from Nova Scotia to the Caribbean to the African coast. He is best known for his association with Edward Low and Francis Spriggs, and for his involvement with two well-known and well-documented maroonings.
Jasper Seagar	d. 1721	1719–1721	England	Active in the Indian Ocean, best known for sailing with Edward England, Olivier Levasseur, and Richard Taylor.
Robert Semple (Richard Sample)	d. 1719	1719	Unknown	Was given command of a prize ship by Edward England, which was run ashore and captured off Brazil.
Abraham Samuel	d.1705	1696-1705	Madagascar	Known as "Deaan Tuley-Noro" or "Tolinar Rex," a mulatto pirate of the Indian Ocean. Briefly led a combined pirate-Antanosy kingdom from Fort Dauphin, Madagascar (modern Tôlanaro).
Giles Shelley	d.1710	1690s-1699	England	A pirate trader active between New York and Madagascar. His trips greatly enriched colonial merchants while angering officials.
Richard Shipton	d. 1726	1723–1726	Unknown	Active in the Caribbean, best known for sailing alongside Edward Low and Francis Spriggs.
James Skyrme	d. 1722	1720–1722	Wales	A Welsh pirate best known for captaining two of Bartholomew Roberts' prize ships.
Francis Spriggs	d. 1725	to 1725	England	Along with George Lowther and Edward Low, Spriggs was primarily active in the Bay of Honduras during the early 1720s.
Daniel Stillwell	?	1715–1718	England	A minor pirate in the Caribbean, best known for his association with Benjamin Hornigold.
Ralph Stout	d. 1697	1692–1697	Unknown	Active in the Indian Ocean. He is best known for rescuing fellow pirate Robert Culliford after each of them spent separate 4-year periods in Mughal Empire prisons.
Thomas Sutton	1699–1722	1719–1722	Scotland	Active off the coast of Africa. He was best known for sailing alongside Bartholomew Roberts.
John Swann (pirate)	?	1698–1699	Unknown	A minor pirate in the Indian Ocean, known almost entirely for speculation about his relationship with Robert Culliford.
John Taylor	early 18th century		England	At Reunion Island, Taylor is reputed to have captured the most valuable prize in pirate history.
Thomas Tew	d. 1695	1692–1695	England	Despite only going on two pirate voyages, Tew pioneered a route later known as the Pirate Round.
Captain Thompson	d. 1719	1719	Cuba	Active in the Caribbean. He is primarily known for a single incident involving grenades.
John Thurber	1649–1717 (or 1625–1705)	1685–1693	Unknown	Last name also Churcher, he was a pirate trader and slave trader active off Madagascar. He is best known for his role in introducing rice to America as a staple crop and export commodity.
Regnier Tongrelow	?	1704–1705	France or Netherlands	A prolific privateer who operated out of New England. He captured a large number of ships over a short career, sending most back to New York, and was known for attacking the largest ships he could find.
Richard Tookerman	1691–1723	1718–1723	England	As a pirate, smuggler, and trader active in the Caribbean and the Carolinas, he became best known for involvement with pirates Stede Bonnet and Bartholomew Roberts.
Rais Hamidou	1770–1815	1790–1815	Algiers	An Algerian privateer, later admiral who captured several ships during his career.
Turn Joe	?	1717	Ireland	Irish pirate and privateer who left English service and sailed for Spain instead as a guarda costa privateer in the Caribbean.
Charles Vane	1680–1721	1716–1721	England	Disliked due to his cruelty, Vane showed little respect for the pirate code, cheating his crew out of their shares in the takings.
Hendrick van Hoven	d. 1699	1698–1699	Netherlands	A buccaneer and pirate active in the Caribbean. He was known as "the grand pirate of the West Indies."
Thomas Vaughan (pirate)	d.1696	1692-1696	Ireland	Irish pirate and privateer who sailed for France during the Nine Years' War. His trial was notable as a test of English common law against admiralty law.
John Vidal	?	1727	Ireland / Colonial America	A minor Irish-American pirate briefly active near Ocracoke Inlet off North Carolina. He is best known for bringing the Farley family with him, causing Martha Farley to be one of the few women tried for piracy.
Thomas Wake	d. 1696	1694–1696	Colonial America	Best known for sailing alongside Thomas Tew to join Henry Every in the Indian Ocean, hunting the Moghul treasure fleet.
Richard Want	?	1692–1696	Colonial America	Active in the Indian Ocean. He is best known for sailing alongside Thomas Tew and Henry Every.
James Weatherhill	d. 1703	1693	Caribbean	A privateer and pirate active in King William's War.
Brigstock Weaver	?	1720–1725	Unknown	He is best known for his association with fellow pirates Thomas Anstis and Bartholomew Roberts.
Edward Welch (pirate)	d.1708	1691-1708	American colonies	Best known for leading a pirate settlement and trading post at Madagascar.
John West (pirate)	?	1713–1714	Unknown	A minor pirate in the Caribbean, best known for his association with Benjamin Hornigold.
Joseph Wheeler (pirate)	?	1696–1698	Unknown	He is best known for sailing alongside Dirk Chivers and Robert Culliford.
Thomas White	d. 1708	1698–1708	England	He was only briefly a captain on his own but served under several more prominent captains such as George Booth, John Bowen, Thomas Howard, John Halsey, and Nathaniel North.
David Williams (pirate)	d. 1709	1698–1709	Wales	Welsh sailor who turned pirate after being abandoned on Madagascar. He was only briefly a captain, and is best known for sailing under a number of more prominent pirate captains.
Paulsgrave Williams	?	1716–1723	Colonial America	A pirate who sailed the Caribbean, American eastern seaboard, and off West Africa. He is best known for sailing alongside Samuel Bellamy.
Christopher Winter	?	1716–1723	England	English pirate active in the Caribbean. He is best known for sailing in Spanish service and launching the career of Edward England.
Nicholas Woodall	?	1718	Unknown	He is best known for his involvement with Charles Vane and Benjamin Hornigold.
Edward Woodman	?	1692–1706	Colonial America	A pirate active in the Indian Ocean and the Caribbean.
Richard Worley	d. 1719	to 1719	England	Credited as one of the first pirates to fly the skull and crossbones pirate flag.
Emanuel Wynn	early 18th century		France	Was the first pirate to fly the "skull and crossbones" Jolly Roger. His design also incorporated an hourglass below the skull.
Charles Yeats	?	1718	Unknown	He is best known for sailing alongside and then abandoning Charles Vane.

== Post Golden Age: pirates, privateers, smugglers, and river pirates: 1730–1885 ==
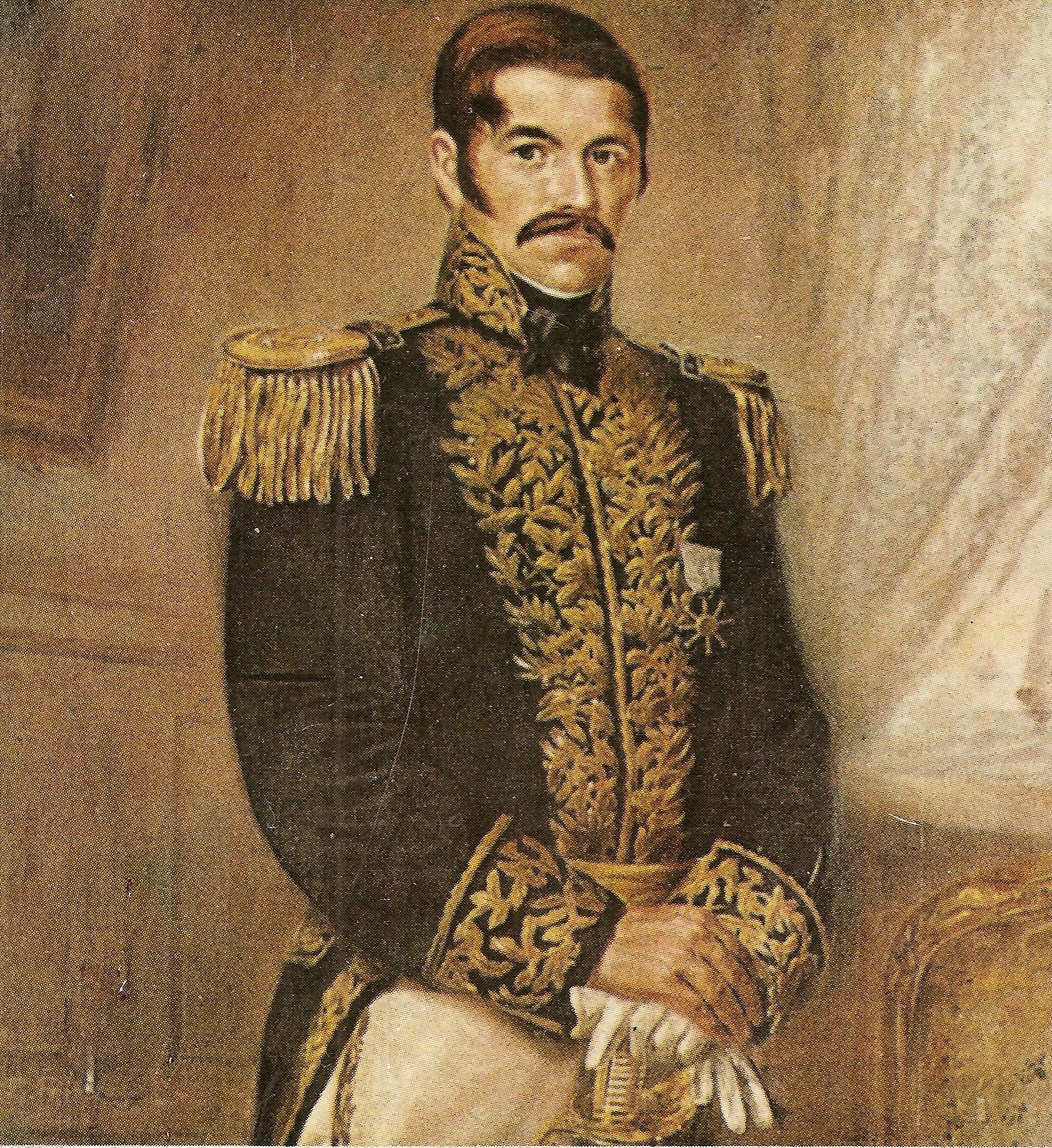
Luis Brion, Dutch privateer active in the Caribbean before joining as admiral of Simon Bolivar army

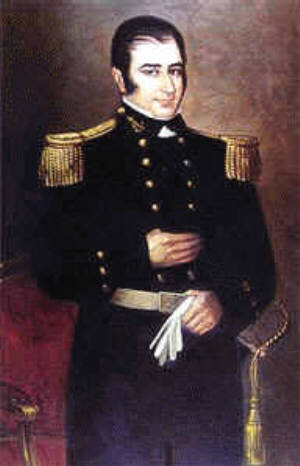
Hippolyte Bouchard, oil on canvas by José Gil de Castro

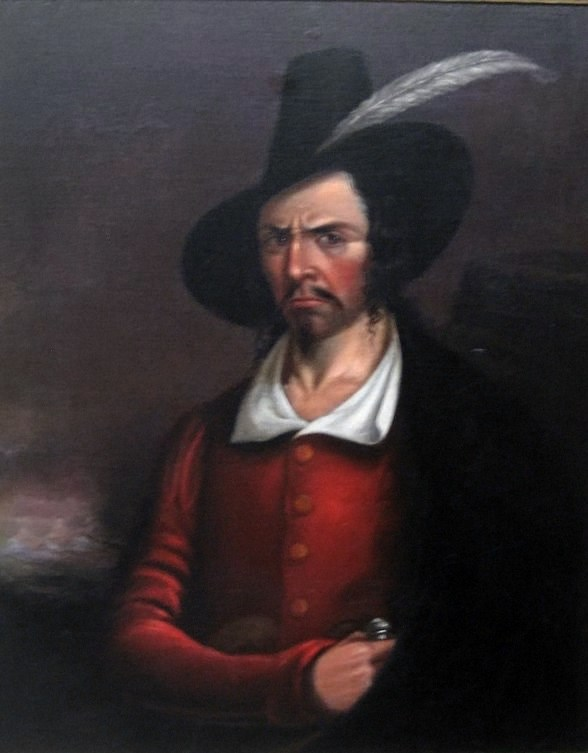
Jean Lafitte

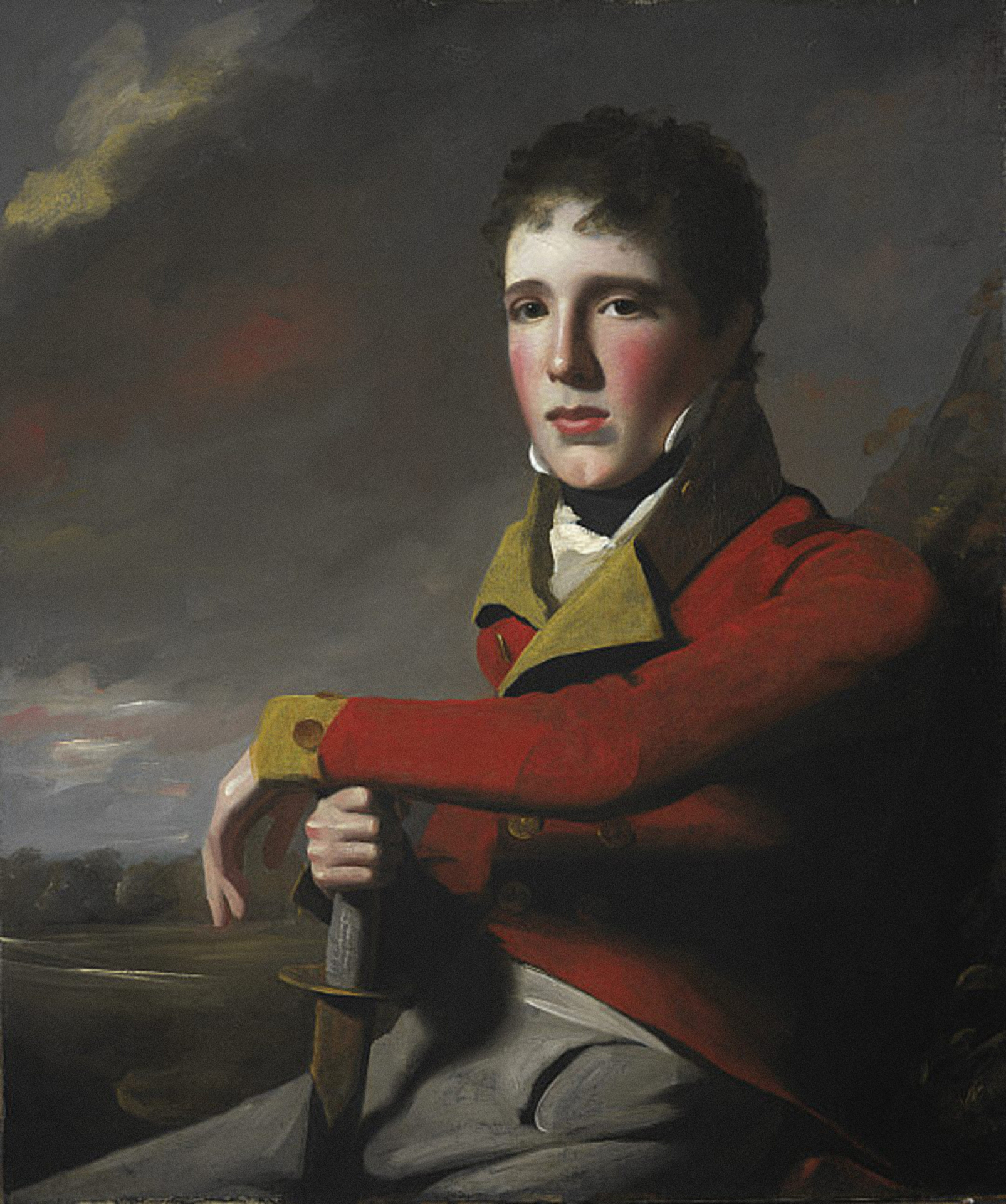
Gregor MacGregor in the British Army, painted by George Watson, 1804

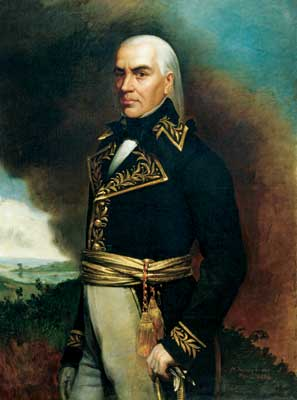
Francisco de Miranda by Martin Tovar y Tovar

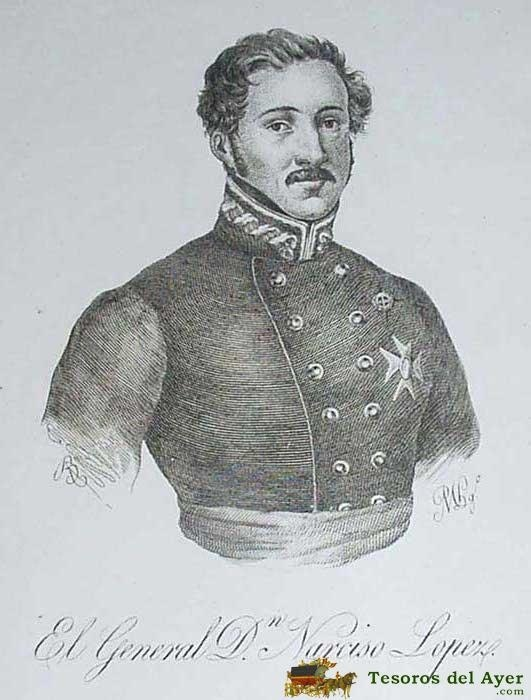
Narciso Lopez, Venezuelan filibuster

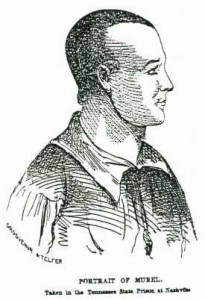
John A. Murrell, known as the "Great Western Land Pirate," ran an American gang of river pirates and highwaymen along the Mississippi River

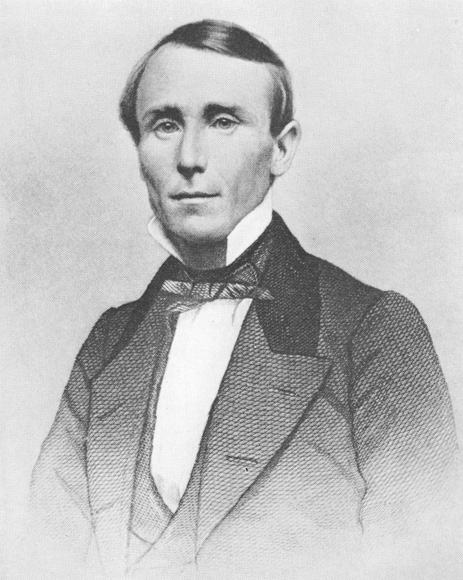
William Walker, American filibuster

Name	Life	Years Active	Country of origin	Comments
José Joaquim Almeida	1777–1832	1812–1832	Portugal	Portuguese Barbary corsair who fought in the Anglo-American War of 1812 and the Argentine War of Independence.
Peter Alston	1765–1804	1797–1804	United States	River pirate, highwayman, and counterfeiter, son of counterfeiter, Philip Alston, alias James May, who was believed to be an associate of the Samuel Mason and Micajah "Big" Harpe and Wiley "Little" Harpe.
Philip Alston	1740 or 1741–after 1799	1770?–1799?	United States	River pirate and counterfeiter, an associate of the counterfeiter John Duff and father of river pirate, highwayman, and counterfeiter, Peter Alston.
François Aregnaudeau	1774–1813	1810–1821	France	Breton who commanded a number of privateers, most notably Blonde, and Duc de Dantzig. In them he captured numerous prizes. He and Duc de Dantzig disappeared without at trace around the end of 1812. Their disappearance gave rise to an unsubstantiated gruesome ghost ship legend.
Louis-Michel Aury	1788–1821	1810–1821	France	French privateer, served the Republics of Venezuela and Mexico. In Amelia island Aury created an administrative body called the "Supreme Council of the Floridas", directed his secretaries Pedro Gual Escandón and Vicente Pazos Kanki to draw up a constitution, and invited all Florida to unite in throwing off the Spanish yoke.
Joseph Baker	d. 1800	1800	Canada	The single piratical action of his career consisted of an unsuccessful attempt to commandeer the sloop Eliza.
Renato Beluche	1780–1860	1803–1823	Louisiana, New Spain	A known associate of the Lafitte Brothers active in the Caribbean before joining Simon Bolivar army in his fight for South American independence.
Hippolyte Bouchard	1780–1837	1817–1819	France	A French and Argentine sailor who fought for Argentina, Chile and Peru.
Luis Brion de Trox	1782–1821	1806–1821	Curaçao	Dutch privateer, served to the Republics of Venezuela and Great Colombia.
Flora Burn	fl. 1741	1740s–1750s	England	Female pirate active mainly off the East coast of North America from 1741.
Cabeza de Perro	1800 – ?	?	Spain	Was a Spanish pirate. His physical characteristics earned him his nickname, which translates to Dog Head.
Henri Caesar	early 19th century	1805–1830	Haiti	Haitian pirate supposedly active in the Caribbean during the early 19th century. Historical existence is doubtful.
Eric Cobham and Maria Lindsey	1700–1760	1720s–1740s	England	Cobham and his wife, Maria, were primarily active in the Gulf of St. Lawrence.
James Copeland	1823–1857	1830s–1857	United States	A leader of a gang of pirates, smugglers, and outlaws in southern Mississippi and southern Alabama, around Mobile, known as the Wages and Copeland Clan.
Richard Coyle	d. 1738	1738	England	He is known for a single incident involving the murder of the Captain of the ship St. John.
Joaquin Crespo	1841–1898	1888	Venezuela	In 1888 A group of Crespo revolutionaries entered the steamer Bolívar, anchored in Port of Spain, Trinidad, to capture it and invade Venezuela to overthrow the President Rojas Paúl, but were discovered and forced to disembark. Another group, waiting on land, began an assault and battle against the crew. British soldiers, with fixed bayonets, boarded and subdued the Venezuelan revolutionaries. From Trinidad, Crespo fled to Saint Thomas, then a Danish Virgin Island. In Charlotte Amalie, Crespo attempted to invade Venezuela aboard the schooner Ana Jacinta. Defeated by the government off shore of Curaçao, he was imprisoned in La Rotunda prison, later pardoned by President Rojas Paúl with the promise of a temporary retirement from politics. He devoted himself to tending his ranch, before going into exile in Peru.
Jacob Pettersson Degenaar	1692–1766	1740s	Sweden	
Sadie Farrell (Sadie The Goat)	?	1869	United States	An Irish American New York City river pirate and the criminal leader of the Charlton Street Gang in 1869; likely a folklore story.
James Ford	1770?–1833	1799?–1833	United States	A civic leader and business owner in western Kentucky and southern Illinois, secretly, was the leader of a gang of river pirates and highwaymen, along the Ohio River, known as the "Ford's Ferry Gang."
Hezekiah Frith	Early 19th century	1790s–1800s	Bermuda	British ship owner and smuggler known as Bermuda's "gentleman privateer". Alleged to have used his business as a cover to withhold cargo sized in privateering expeditions and amass a small fortune.
Vincent Gambi	d. 1820		Italy	A pirate based out of New Orleans, he was an associate of Jean Lafitte.
José Gaspar (Gasparilla)	1756–1821	1783–1821	Spain	Spanish naval officer who turned to piracy and operated from a base in southwest Florida. Although Gaspar is a popular figure in local folklore and was the inspiration for Tampa's Gasparilla Pirate Festival, there is no evidence of his existence.
Leoncio Prado Gutiérrez	1853–1883	1876–1877	Peru	Prado a Peruvian mariner with Cuban revolutionaries seized the Spanish ship Moctezuma in the Caribbean sea at North of La Hispaniola. Renamed as Cespedes failed to liberate Cuba under Spanish rule. Realizing how the ship remained in the hands of the royalist navy, Prado ordered his men to leave and lit a barrel of gunpowder inside of the ammunition storage facilities.
Catherine Hagerty and Charlotte Badger	early 19th century	1806	England	Australian convicts. Among a group of convicts taken on board a shorthanded ship as crew. The convicts commandeered the ship and sailed for New Zealand. Hagerty was put ashore and died, Badger was never seen again.
Micajah and Wiley Harpe	Before 1768–1799 (Micajah); Before 1770–1799 (Wiley)	1775?–1799 (Micajah); 1775?–1804 (Wiley)	United States	America's first known serial killers, were Loyalists in the American Revolution, as well as, river pirates and highwaymen, who preyed on travelers along the Ohio River and the waterways of Tennessee, Kentucky, and Illinois. The Harpe Brothers were associates of Samuel Mason and Peter Alston.
Pugsy Hurley	1846–after 1886	1865?–after 1886	United States	English-born American burglar, river pirate and underworld figure in New York City during the mid-to late 19th century. An old time thief from the old Seventh Ward, he was also a well-known waterfront thug whose criminal career lasted over two decades. He especially gained notoriety as a member of the Patsy Conroy Gang.
Rahmah ibn Jabir al-Jalahimah	1760–1826	1780–1826	Kuwait	The most famous pirate in the Persian Gulf, he ruled over Qatar and Dammam for short periods and fought alongside the Wahhabis against the Al-Khalifa tribe of Bahrain.
Bill Johnston	1782–1870	1810–1860	United States	Nicknamed "Pirate of the Thousand Islands".
Edward Jordan	1771–1809	1794–1809	Canada	Irish rebel, fisherman and pirate of Nova Scotia.
Jørgen Jørgensen	1780–1841	1807–1808	Denmark	Danish adventurer and writer, he was captured by the British as a privateer during the Napoleonic Wars.
Jean Lafitte	c. 1776–1826?	1803–1815; 1817–1820s	France	French pirate (or privateer) active in the Gulf of Mexico during the early 1800s. A wanted fugitive by the United States, he later participated, during the War of 1812, in the Battle of New Orleans on the side of Andrew Jackson and the Americans. In 1822, Lafitte approached the navy of Gran Colombia and Simon Bolivar granted a commission and given a new ship, a 40-ton schooner named General Santander.
Pierre Lafitte	1770–1821	1803–1821	France	French pirate, and lesser-known brother of Jean Lafitte, active mainly in the Gulf of Mexico.
Narciso Lopez	1797–1851	1850–1851	Venezuela	Venezuelan adventurer, enlisted in United States about six hundred filibusters and successfully reached Cuba in May 1850 to liberate the island from Spanish Crown rule. His troops took the town of Cárdenas, carrying a flag that López had designed, which later became the banner of modern Cuba. After another failed attempt to free Cuba he was executed in Havana by the royalists in 1851.
Sam Hall Lord	1778–1844	1800s–1840s	Barbados	Sam Lord was one of the most famous buccaneers on the island of Barbados.
Kazimierz Lux	1780–1846	1803–1819	Poland	The Polish Pirates of the Caribbean. After fighting against a slave rebellion in Haiti, Lux started a career of piracy – shooting and boarding an American brig was one of his more spectacular successes; the vessel was later sold for 20,000 francs in Havana.
John Macferson	?	1731-1732	England	Minor English pirate active in the Atlantic. He is best known for a single incident involving a Portuguese ship, and for being one of the last pirates of the Golden Age.
Gregor MacGregor	1786–1845	1810–1830	Scotland	A Scottish adventurer, soldier and land speculator who fought in the Venezuelan and New Granadan struggle for independence. In 1817, led an army of only 150 men in an assault on Amelia Island, Florida. After his return to Britain in 1820, he claimed to be cacique of Poyais a fictional Central American country that MacGregor had invented which, with his promotional efforts, drew investors and eventually colonists.
Francisco de Miranda	1750–1816	1806	Venezuela	Venezuelan militar and adventurer, who organized in 1806 a private expedition from New York with the intention of liberate Venezuela from Spanish rule. On April 28 of 1806 the small fleet was overtaken by Spanish warships off the coast of Venezuela. Only the Leander escaped escorted by HMS Lilly. The Backus and Bee were captured with all the revolutionaries. Sixty men were put on trial for piracy and Ten were sentenced to death in Puerto Cabello. The Leander and the expeditionary force regrouped on the British islands of Barbados and Trinidad. The new expedition assisted by Royal Navy ships landed at La Vela de Coro on August 3, captured the fort and raised the tricolor flag for the first time on Venezuelan soil. Before dawn the next morning the expeditionaries occupied Coro, but found no support from the city residents and Miranda returned to England.
Samuel Mason	1739–1803	to 1803	United States	Initially, a Revolutionary War Patriot captain in the Ohio County, Virginia militia and an associate judge and squire in Kentucky, Mason later, ran a gang of highway robbers and waterways river pirates.
John A. Murrell	1806?–1844	to 1834	United States	Near-legendary bandit, known as the "Great Western Land Pirate," ran a gang of river pirates and highwaymen along the Mississippi River.
José Antonio Páez	1789–1873	1849	Venezuela	General José Antonio Páez exiled in Curazao invades Venezuela from La Vela de Coro on July 2, 1849, and penetrates as far as Cojedes plains with the support of León de Febres Cordero and his son Ramón Páez with the aime of overhthron the Jose Tadeo Monagas government. Santiago Mariño and José Gregorio Monagas surround Páez's forces. Juan Antonio Sotillo defeats Lorenzo Belisario and Nicasio Belisario at the Manapire Pass on July 17, has their bodies decapitated, and sends the heads to President José Tadeo Monagas. Sotillo also defeated Felipe Macero and José Antonio Páez's rearguard was attacked at the Battle of Casupo, forcing him to capitulate in Macapo to General José Laurencio Silva. In violation of the capitulation, Páez and his men were arrested by Joaquín Herrera. Páez was exiled in 1850 and did not return until 1858 from New York to involve in the Federal War. In 1861, Páez returned to power as president and supreme dictator, but ruled for only two years before again returning to exile in New York.
Robert Surcouf	1779–1823	1789–1808	France	French privateer and slave trader who operated in the Indian Ocean between 1789 and 1801, and again from 1807 to 1808, capturing over 40 prizes, while amassing a large fortune as a ship-owner, both from privateering and from commerce.
Rachel Wall	1760–1789	1781–1782	Province of Pennsylvania	Rachel and her husband George Wall were active off the New Hampshire coast until George and the crew were washed out to sea. She was hanged in Boston on 8 October 1789.
William Walker	1824–1860	1852–1860	United States	American lawyer, journalist and adventurer, who organized several private military expeditions into Latin America, with the intention of establishing English-speaking colonies under his personal control. Walker became president of the Republic of Nicaragua in 1856 and ruled until 1857, when he was defeated by a coalition of Central American armies. He was executed in Trujillo by the government of Honduras in 1860.
Alexander White	1762–1784	1784	East Coast of America	Hanged for piracy in Cambridge, Massachusetts in November 1784.
Dominique You	1775–1830	1802–1814	Haiti	Acquired a reputation for daring as a pirate. Retired to become a politician in New Orleans.

== Renegades of the West Indies: 1820–1830 ==
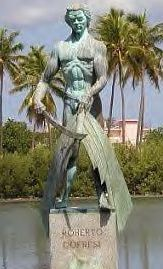
The last of the successful Caribbean pirates, Roberto Cofresí underwent one of the broadest mythifications among Hispanic pirates.

Name	Life	Years active	Country of origin	Comments
Mansel Alcantra (Alcantara)	fl. 1829	1820s	Spain	In 1829, he captured the Topaz off St. Helena and had the entire crew murdered.
Roberto Cofresí	1791–1825	1818–1825	Puerto Rico	Considered the "last of the [successful] West India pirates", Cofresí avoided capture by the navies of six nations for years and became the final target of the West Indies Anti-Piracy Operations. After being captured by the Puerto Rican militia, he claimed to have a stash of 4,000 pieces of eight hidden, which he tried to use as a bribe.
Diabolito (Little Devil)	d. 1823		Cuba	Cuban-born pirate active in the Caribbean during the early 19th century. He was one of the first pirates to be hunted down by Commodore David Porter and the Mosquito Fleet during the early 1820s.
Charles Gibbs	1798–1831	1816–1831	United States	One of the last pirates active in the Caribbean, and one of the last people executed for piracy by the United States.
"Don" Pedro Gilbert	1800–1834	1832–1834	Colombia	Took part in the last recorded incident of piracy in Atlantic waters.
Benito de Soto	1805–1830	1827–1830	Spain	The most notorious of the last generation to attack shipping on the Atlantic Ocean.
Jacque Alexander Tardy	1767–1827	1817–1827	France	

== Piracy in East and Southeast Asia: 1400–1860 ==
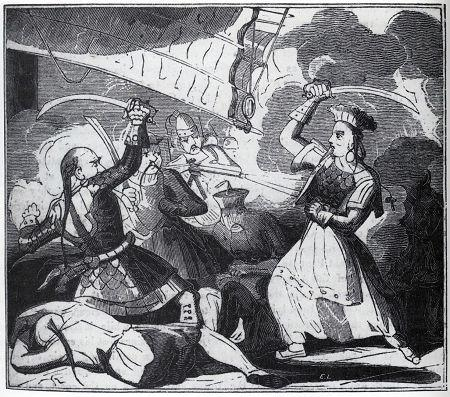
Ching Shih, from China, the most successful female pirate and one of the world's most powerful pirates in history.

Chui A-poo, a powerful 19th-century Qing Chinese pirate

Name	Life	Years Active	Country of origin	Comments
Chen Zuyi	−1407	15th century	China	Based operations in Palembang, Sumatra and raided the Malacca Strait. Eventually captured by Ming admiral Zheng He.
Limahong	1499–1575	16th century	China	Pirate-warlord who raided the coast of Southern China, the northern Philippine Islands and Manila in 1574.
Wang Zhi	−1560	16th century	China	Smuggler turned head of pirate syndicate, raided from Japan to Thailand.
Lin Daoqian	−1580s	16th century	China	Led pirate attacks along the coast of Guangdong and Fujian. Driven to Taiwan by the Ming navy commander Yu Dayou.
Tuanku Abbas	early 19th century	to 1844	Malay Archipelago	The brother of a rajah of Achin, known for his sponsoring and leading of pirate raids.
Eli Boggs	1810–1857	1830–1857	United States	Pirate who sailed in Chinese junk for smuggling.
Cheng I	d. 1807	to 1807	China	A pirate on the Chinese coast in the 18h and 19th centuries.
Cheung Po Tsai	early 19th century	to 1810	China	Active along the Guangdong coast and is said to have commanded a fleet of 600 junks.
Ching Shih	d. 1844	1807–1810	China	A prominent female pirate in late Qing China. She was a prostitute who married a pirate and rose to prominence after his death. Regarded as one of the most powerful pirates in human history, she commanded her husband's fleet after his death. While the fleet she inherited was already large, she further increased the number of ships and crew. At its height, her fleet was composed of more than 1,500 ships and 80,000 sailors. She controlled much of the waters of the South China Sea. After years of piracy during which she defeated several attempts to capture her, the Qing government offered her peace in 1810 and she was able to retire. She married her second-in-command.
Chui A-poo	d. 1851?	1840s–1850	China	Based in Bias Bay east of Hong Kong, Chui preyed on merchant ships in the South China Sea until his fleet was defeated by the Royal Navy in 1849.
Abdulla al-Hadj	d. 1843	1800s	England/Arabia	English pirate primarily known for his activity in the South China Sea
Shap Ng-tsai	fl. 1840s	1845–1849	China	Commanded around 70 junks in the South China Sea before retiring and accepting a pardon from the Chinese government.

== Blackbirders, Shanghaiers, Crimps and African Slave Traders: 1860–1900 ==
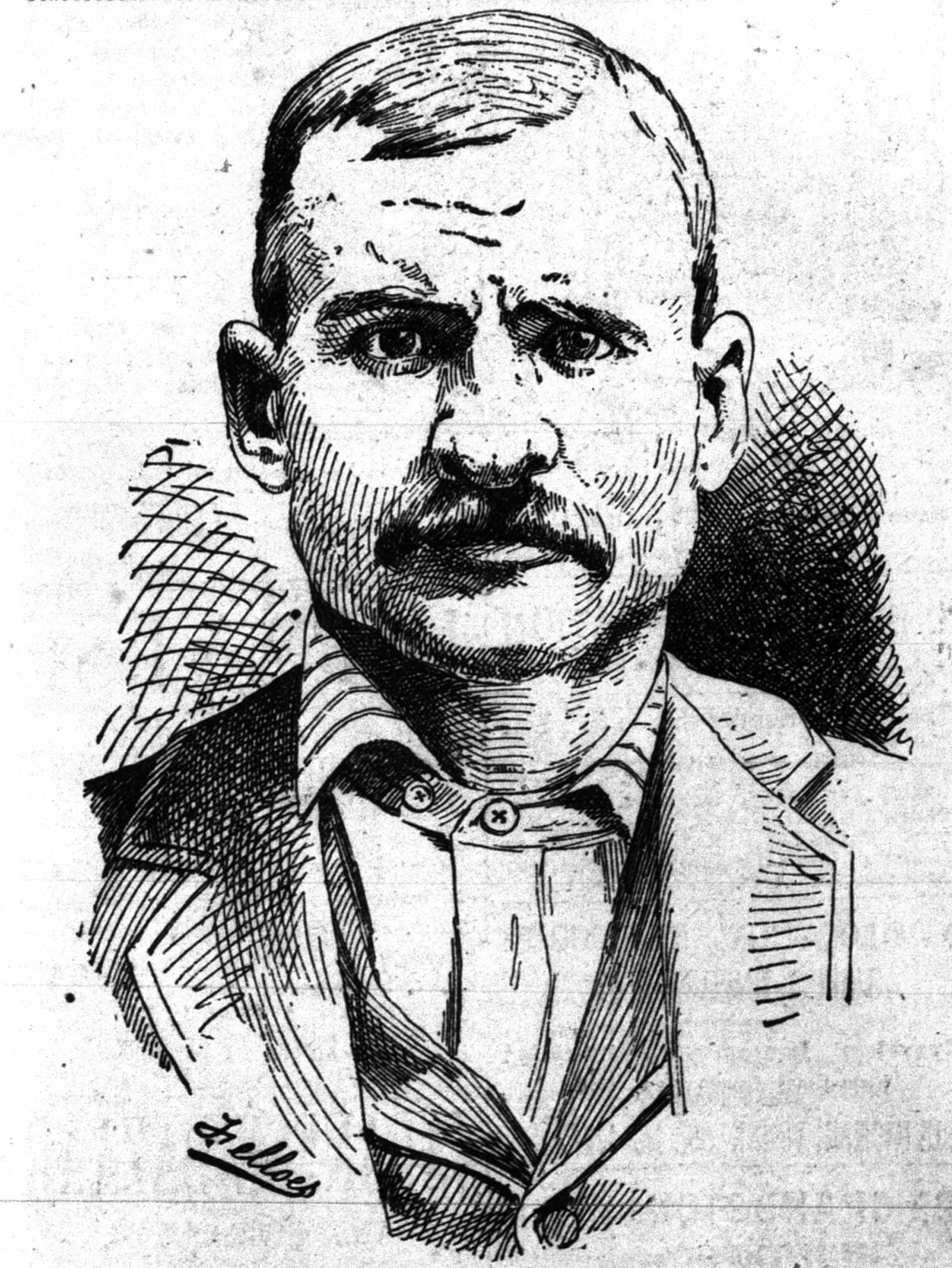
Illustration of bunko Kelly nicknamed king of crimpers

Name	Life	Years Active	Country of origin	Comments
Nathaniel Gordon	1826–1862	1860	United States	The first and only American slave trader to be tried, convicted, and executed "for being engaged in the Slave Trade" in accordance with the Piracy Law of 1820.
Bully Hayes	1829–1877	1850–1877	United States	The Pirate of the South Sea, was a notorious blackbirder in the South Pacific, and was described as "the last of the Buccaneers".
Albert W. Hicks	1820–1860	1860	United States	New York waterfront thug who killed the 3-man crew of an oyster sloop after being shanghaied. He was the last man hanged for piracy in the United States.
James "Shanghai" Kelly	1830–1892	1850–1870	United States	A legendary figure in San Francisco history who owned several boarding houses and saloons, Kelly was renowned for his ability to supply men to understaffed ships. He was reported to have shanghaied 100 men for three ships in a single evening, by hosting a free booze cruise to celebrate his "birthday", then serving opium-laced whiskey to knock out his guests.
Joseph "Bunko" Kelly	d. aft. 1908	1879–1894	England	The "King of the Crimps" in Portland, Oregon, he shanghaied over 2,000 men in all. In 1893, he delivered 20+ men who had mistakenly consumed embalming fluid from the open cellar of a mortuary. The ship sailed off before the captain realized most of the men were dead.
Pedro Ñancupel	1837–1888	1870s–1888	Chile	A Pilgerodendron lumberjack turned pirate who was active in Guaitecas Archipelago and other archipelagoes of Patagonia in the 1870s and 1880s. Ñancupel was captured in Melinka in 1886 and bought into justice in Ancud the same year. After escaping from detainment in Ancud he was captured once again and executed by firing squad on November 11, 1888. He was said at the time to have killed 99 persons.
Ben Pease	1837–1870	1860–1870	United States	A New England sea captain who kidnapped Pacific Islanders aboard the Pioneer, providing labor for the plantations of Fiji. When Bully Hayes was arrested for piracy in Samoa, Pease helped him to escape. When next the Pioneer returned to port, Hayes was at the helm, and was rumored to have killed Pease during a fight.

== Rebel movements in Latin America and piracy off the coast of Somalia :Piracy from the 20th–21st century 1901– ==
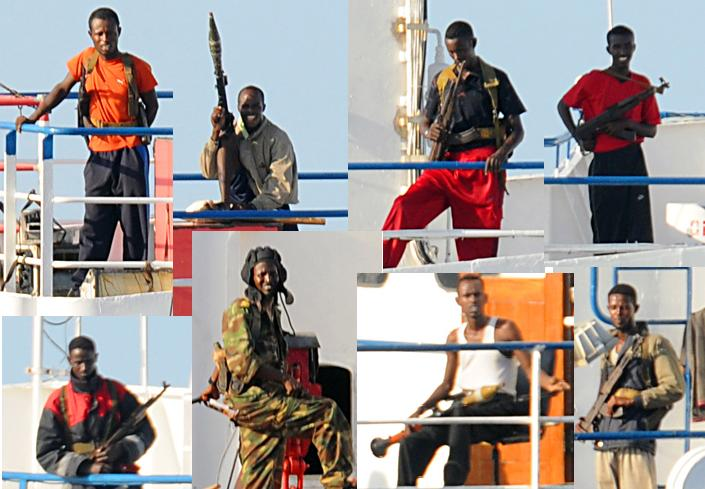
Photomontage of Somali pirates on the MV Faina

Name	Life	Years active	Country of origin	Comments
"Roaring" Dan Seavey	1865–1949	1900–1930	United States	Active as a "Timber Pirate", "Lake Pirate", and "Great Lakes Pirate", in Wisconsin and Michigan, on the Great Lakes.
Rafael de Nogales Méndez	1879–1936	1902	Venezuela	With the support of president Zelaya of Nicaragua, Nogales participated in a failed attempt to overthrow Venezuelan dictator Cipriano Castro involving an expedition aboard of schooner La Libertad.
Joseph Mortelmans	1884–?	1907–1908	Belgium	A 25-year-old seaman on the Nueva Tigre, a 50-ton sailing ship registered and sailed under the Peruvian flag, forced the captain and mate into the water on 18 November 1907 after departing Callao. He forced the other seaman, a youth named Skerritt, to help sail the ship to the west. The ship's name was changed to be the White Rose. The ship struck the reef of Abemama in the Gilbert Islands on 24 January 1908., Mortelmans was charged with piracy and sentence to a prison in New South Wales, Australia, and was released in 1931.
Jose Maria Ortega Martinez	1859–1933	1920–1931	Venezuela	In 1921, Ortega Martinez along with Francisco Linares Alcantara in Germany organized an attempted invasion of Venezuela to overthrow the Gómez dictatorship. In Kiel, they hired mercenaries and completed the purchase of two ships, the Odin and the Harrier. Martínez died in exile in Mexico City.
Román Delgado Chalbaud	1882–1929	1929	Venezuela	On 11 August 1929 Delgado Chalbaud led the steamship Falke, (renamed General Anzoátegui for the occasion) into Cumaná in a failed attempt to overthrow Venezuelan dictator Juan Vicente Gomez.
Rafael Simón Urbina	1897–1952	1929–1931	Venezuela	Participated in Gustavo Machado Morales's June 1929 taking of Fort Amsterdam in Curaçao, involving 250 men. This attempt involved the kidnapping of the governor of Curaçao, Leonardus Albert Fruytier, who was hauled off to invade Venezuela on the stolen American steamship Maracaibo to overthrow the dictatorship of General Gomez.
Gustavo Machado Morales	1898–1987	1929	Venezuela	Participated in Rafael Simón Urbina's June 1929 taking of Fort Amsterdam in Curaçao, in another failed attempt to overthrow dictator Juan Vicente Gómez.
Peter de Neumann	1917–1972	1941	United Kingdom	Second Officer aboard the RN prize vessel Criton (captured from the Vichy French). Widely known as "The Man From Timbuctoo".
Boysie Singh	1908–1957	1947–1956	Trinidad	Active in the waters between Venezuela and Trinidad. Singh commonly attacked fishing boats, killing the crew and stealing the boat engine, before sinking the boat and selling the engine.
Henrique Galvão	1895–1970	1961	Portugal	On January 22, 1961, Henrique Galvão led the Santa Maria hijacking, also known as Operation Dulcinea. The liner evaded both the U.S. Navy and British Royal Navy for eleven days before docking safely at Recife, Brazil.
Paul del Rio	1943–2015	1963	Venezuela	On 13 February 1963, Paul del Rio at the age of 19 was the leader of a Venezuelan revolutionary group, the Armed Forces of National Liberation, that seized the Venezuelan cargo ship Anzoategui in the Caribbean, in a failed attempt to overthrow President Romulo Betancourt. Involving 25 men, the ship was hauled off to the Brazilian coast, evading both the Venezuelan Navy and the U.S. Navy.
Asad 'Booyah' Abdulahi	1966–	1998–	Somalia	Somali pirate boss, active in capturing ships in the Gulf of Aden and Indian Ocean for ransoms.
Abdul Hassan	1969–	2005–	Somalia	Somali pirate nicknamed "the one who never sleeps". Leader of the 350-men strong group "Central Regional Coast Guard", active in capturing ships for ransoms.
Mohamed Abdi Hasan "Big Mouth"	1990–	2005–2012	Somalia	He founded the Hobyo-Harardhere Piracy Network in 2005 and rapidly grew to become one of Somalia's biggest pirates. In 2012 he began to leave the piracy "industry" and diversified his holdings into a multinational business empire. He was arrested in Malaysia but was released because he obtained diplomatic immunity, in 2013 he was lured to Belgium and sentenced in 2016 to twenty years in prison.
Abduwali Muse	1990–	2008–2009	Somalia	On 16 February 2011, Muse was a defendant in the first piracy trial in the United States in almost two centuries.
