= Thomas Barrow (pirate) =

Pirate (died 1726)

Thomas Barrow (died 1726) was a pirate active in the Caribbean. He is best known for proclaiming himself Governor of New Providence.

== History ==
Barrow had captained a ship making supply runs to Royal Africa Company forts on the African coast around 1702, but some years later he was ship's mate aboard a brigantine out of Jamaica. Removed from his post for assaulting another officer, he was later arrested in the Bahamas for stealing gold from a Spanish Marquis. He then led a crew diving the wrecks of the 1715 Spanish treasure fleet, leaving a year later for Nassau. By then pirates led by Benjamin Hornigold controlled New Providence, and Barrow was roaming free. Thomas Walker, the same man who had arrested Barrow, also arrested Daniel Stillwell, but released him when Hornigold threatened to shoot him and insisted that all New Providence pirates were under his protection.

Barrow declared “that he is Governor of Providence and will make it a second Madagascar, and expects 5 or 600 men more from Jamaica sloops to join in the settling of Providence, and to make war on the French and Spaniards, but for the English, they don't intend to meddle with them, unless they are first attack'd by them.” Barrow said that “he only waits for a vessell to go out a pirating;” even without a ship of his own he managed to rob two vessels in the harbor in quick succession. He also extorted money from locals, once threatening to whip a man if he didn't hand over twenty shillings; as a joke — Barrow having declared himself Governor — he gave the man a receipt. With Barrow and Hornigold's pirates threatening the few citizens and landowners left on the island, most settlers and colonists fled. Only a few traders willing to smuggle supplies to the pirates, such as former pirate John Cockram, were left untouched.

In 1717 King George offered a pardon to all pirates who surrendered within a year. Governor Woodes Rogers arrived in the Bahamas in 1718 to accept the surrenders and hunt down any pirates who refused the pardon or returned to piracy. Hornigold and many other pirates accepted the pardon; he, Cockram, and others even became pirate hunters, bringing their former associates back for trial. Barrow may have taken the pardon as well: he was still on the island and free as of 1725, married and with a daughter. He died in August of the following year.

== See also ==
- John Auger, one of the pardoned pirates who returned to piracy but was captured by Hornigold.
- Charles Vane, the most prominent of the pirates who refused the pardon outright.
- Republic of Pirates
