= Nicholas Woodall =

British pirate and smuggler

- Other name: Nickolas
- Occupations: Pirate and smuggler
- Years active: 1718
- Known for: Involvement with Charles Vane and Benjamin Hornigold
- Piratical career
- Other names: Woodale
- Base of operations: Caribbean
- Commands: Wolf

Nicholas Woodall (fl. 1718, first name also Nickolas, last name also Woodale) was a pirate and smuggler active in the Caribbean. He is best known for his involvement with Charles Vane and Benjamin Hornigold.

== History ==
In September 1717 King George offered a full pardon to all pirates who surrendered by the following September. Captain Vincent Pearse sailed his ship HMS Phoenix to the Caribbean in March 1718 to deliver the news, in the process capturing Charles Vane, who had refused the offer of pardon. Hornigold, Francis Leslie, Josiah Burgess, and Thomas Nichols – de facto leaders of the pirates – urged Pearse to release Vane as a show of good faith to the other pirates. Pearse did so and over 200 pirates surrendered to him, including Nicholas Woodall.

Vane returned to piracy shortly afterwards. Having captured the ships Emperor and Neptune off of the Province of South Carolina in August, he ordered them to follow him to Green Turtle Key near Abaco where Vane and his crew looted the captured ships and careened their own brigantine. That September, they were preparing to let the two ships go when a sloop approached. The newcomer was the 30-ton Wolf (or Woolfe) commanded by Woodall; he had been cleared to leave New Providence to go turtle hunting, but in reality was smuggling ammunition and supplies to Vane. After Woodall delivered news of Governor Woodes Rogers’ pardoning of many pirates and crackdown on others, Vane’s men were incensed. They let Emperor go but crippled Neptune after threatening to maroon its captain and crew. Woodall loaded the Neptune’s goods aboard his ship and left alongside Vane.

Hornigold and John Cockram had been shadowing Vane and visited the stranded Neptune and its crew, who told him about Vane and Woodall. Hornigold then sailed after the pirates; Vane escaped but Hornigold overtook and captured the Wolf. Rogers impounded the Wolf and imprisoned Woodall, impressed with Hornigold’s skill and loyalty: “Capt. Hornygold having proved honest, and disobliged his old friends by seazing this vessel, it devides the people here and makes me stronger than I expected.” Vane returned to Abaco and threatened the Neptune before leaving again. Hornigold and Cockram then returned with several small ships, rescuing Neptune.

In October Rogers wrote to the Council of Trade and Plantations that Woodall was still imprisoned, as Rogers lacked official authority to try the captured pirates: “having not yet a power to make an example of them here, he remains in irons to be sent home to England by the next ship.” Later that same month Hornigold captured John Auger, another pirate who had accepted the pardon but returned to piracy. Rogers still lacked authority to convene an Admiralty Court to try Auger and his crew but decided to proceed anyway, documenting the proceedings and sending copies back to England. He may have sent Woodall back to England for trial as promised; Woodall’s name does not appear among Auger’s trial documents, but as Rogers was now willing to execute pirates on his own authority, it is possible Woodall was hanged instead.
