= Flying Gang =

Pirate stronghold in the Bahamas (1713–1718)

Flying Gang Republic of Pirates
- 1713–1718
- Flag

- The islands of modern-day Bahamas
- Capital: Nassau
- Common languages: English
- Government: Alliance of pirate crews, each with their own "Code of Conduct"
- Legislature: None (de jure)
- Historical era: Golden Age of Piracy
  - Established: 1713
  - Disestablished: 1718
| Preceded by | Succeeded by |
| Colony of the Bahama Islands | Crown Colony of the Bahamas |
- Today part of: The Bahamas; Turks and Caicos Islands

The Flying Gang was an 18th-century group of pirates who established themselves in Nassau, New Providence, the Bahamas after the War of the Spanish Succession and the sinking of the Spanish 1715 Treasure Fleet. The gang consisted of many famous pirates of the time, and they terrorized and pillaged the Caribbean until the Royal Navy and infighting led to their disestablishment. They achieved great fame and wealth by raiding salvagers attempting to recover gold from the sunken Spanish treasure fleet. They established their own codes and governed themselves independent from any of the colonial powers of the time. Nassau was deemed the Republic of Pirates as it attracted many former privateers looking for work to its shores.

While it was not a republic in a formal sense, it was governed by an informal pirate code, which dictated that the crews of the Republic would vote on the leadership of their ships and treat other pirate crews with civility. The activities of the pirates caused havoc with trade and shipping in the West Indies until newly appointed Royal Governor of the Bahama Islands Woodes Rogers reached Nassau in 1718 and restored British control. Rogers, a former privateer himself, offered clemency to the pirates of the Bahamas, known as the "King's Pardon", an offer many pirates took advantage of. Though a few returned to piracy in the following years, British control of the Bahamas had been secured.

== History ==
The era of piracy in the Bahamas escalated in 1696, when the privateer Henry Every brought his ship, the Fancy, loaded with loot from plundering Indian trade ships into Nassau harbour. Every bribed the governor Nicholas Trott with gold and silver, and with the Fancy itself, still loaded with 50 tons of elephant tusks and 100 barrels of gunpowder. This established Nassau as a base where pirates could operate safely, although various governors regularly made a show of suppressing piracy. While the governors were still legally in charge, the pirates became increasingly powerful.

In 1703 a combined Franco-Spanish fleet attacked Nassau, and again in 1706; the island was effectively abandoned by many of its settlers and left without any English government presence. Nassau was eventually taken over by English privateers, who became completely lawless pirates over time, attacking French and Spanish ships. Pirates established themselves in Nassau, effectively creating their own republic with its own governors. By 1713, the War of the Spanish Succession was over, but many British privateers were slow to get the news, or reluctant to accept it, and so slipped into piracy. This led to large numbers of unemployed privateers making their way to New Providence, swelling its numbers. 1713 saw the first outright piracy using Nassau (New Providence) as a base, when John Cockram raided off Florida. The republic was dominated by two famous pirates who were bitter rivals – Benjamin Hornigold and Henry Jennings. Despite their rivalries, the pirates formed themselves into the Flying Gang around 1715 and quickly became infamous for their exploits. The Governor of Bermuda stated that there were over 1,000 pirates in Nassau at that time and that they outnumbered the mere hundred inhabitants in the town.

Pirate Thomas Barrow declared "that he is Governor of Providence and will make it a second Madagascar, and expects 5 or 600 men more from Jamaica sloops to join in the settling of Providence, and to make war on the French and Spaniards, but for the English, they don't intend to meddle with them, unless they are first attack'd by them." The amount of havoc caused by the pirates led to an outcry for their destruction, and finally King George I appointed Woodes Rogers as royal governor of the Bahamas to bring the piracy to an end, and offered a pardon to all pirates who turned themselves in.

=== End of the Gang ===
News of the King's Pardon was brought first from Bermuda in 1717, then by Captain Vincent Pearse of HMS Phoenix, and received a mixed reception, some of those rejecting the pardon being Jacobites. Pearse made a list of 209 pirates on New Providence – fewer than half the pirates on the island – who stated their intention to take the pardon. Taking full control of Nassau, however, proved difficult for Pearse as many pirates, including Charles Vane, had negative reception of his presence. Although Pearse captured Vane during his early tenure in the Republic, upon release Vane troubled Pearse constantly, even managing to steal a sloop and firing a musket volley at the crew of HMS Phoenix. Pearse later abandoned Nassau by the middle of the year.

**List of pirates on New Providence who surrendered to Captain Pearse**
1. Parker Adams
2. Arthur Allen
3. James Coates
4. John Dalrymple
5. Benjamin Hornigold
6. Josiah Burgess
7. Francis Leslie
8. Thomas Nichols
9. Paulsgrave Williams
10. John Lewis
11. Richard Noland
12. John Martin
13. William Connor
14. Thomas Grahame
15. Thomas Terrell
16. John Ealling
17. Robert Wishort
18. James Gratrick
19. Edward Stacey
20. John Fennet
21. John Hunt
22. John Pearse
23. James Bryan
24. Henry Berry
25. Thomas Lamb
26. John Allen
27. Martin Carroll
28. Thomas Clies
29. John Kipperson
30. John Charlton
31. Francis Charnock
32. **David Merredith**
33. **Edward Nowland**
34. **James Goodson**
35. Dennis McCarthy
36. Rowld Barton
37. George Gador
38. George Mann
39. Richard Richards
40. Anthony Jacobs
41. Nabel Clarke
42. Henry Hawkins
43. Daniel White
44. Edward Savory
45. Peter Marshall
46. **Archibald Murry**
47. Daniel Hill
48. William Davey
49. Richard Taylor
50. Martin Townsend
51. **Michl. Scrimshaw**
52. Samuel Richardson
53. Robert Brown
54. Henry Cheek
55. Robert Hunter
56. James Moodey
57. Richard Kaine
58. Thomas Birdsale
59. Robert Dryker
60. **Daniel Carman**
61. **John Dunkin**
62. Geo Feversham
63. John Barker
64. Thomas Codd
65. William Roberts
66. John Waters
67. William Austin
68. Francis Roper
69. Griffith Williams
70. Edward German
71. John Clarke
72. **Richard Bishop**
73. Henry Barnes
74. Daniel Champeon
75. John [B/R]owell
76. William Willis
77. Tristram Wilson
78. Daniel Jones
79. Phillip Calvorley
80. James Brown
81. John Sutton
82. George Raddon
83. Adam Forbes
84. Cornelius Mahon
85. Thomas Pearse
86. David Ross
87. **Jacob Johnson**
88. William Bridges
89. Robert Brown
90. Rt. Moggridge
91. Henry Shipton
92. John Cullomore
93. Peter Johnson
94. Charles Morgan
95. John Auger
96. William South
97. Marmaduke Gee
98. James Morvat
99. Benjamin Turner
100. John Mutlow
101. John Stout
102. Thomas Reynolds
103. James Wheeler
104. Alexander Lyell
105. William Rouse
106. Joseph Clapp
107. Peter Goudet
108. Mark Holmes
109. Daniel Stillwell
110. John Edwards
111. Charles Garrison
112. Joseph Pearse
113. William Grahame
114. Alexander Campbell
115. James Nevill
116. James Fasset
117. Edward Berry
118. John Andrews
119. **David Nearne**
120. Garrt. Peterson
121. Richard Divelly
122. **Charles Vane**
123. Roger Houghton
124. Richard Valentine
125. Samuel Bryce
126. Richard Legatt
127. Richard Rawlings
128. Darby Connelly
129. Arthur Van Pelt
130. John Richards
131. Samuel Beach
132. William Peters
133. John Smith
134. George Sinclair
135. William Hasselton
136. William Harris
137. William Chow
138. Abraham Adams
139. Joseph Thompson
140. James Peterson
141. Peter Mallet
142. William Titso
143. John Arterile
144. **John Mounsey**
145. John Johnson
146. John Poley
147. John Farrow
148. Samuel Addy
149. John Magness
150. Thomas Trouton
151. Edward Miller
152. Daniel Swoord
153. Richard Earle
154. Anthony Kemp
155. John Carye
156. Robert Shear
157. **John Mitchele**
158. **Edward Rogers**
159. Michl. Rogers
160. John Kemp
161. John Sipkins
162. Othenius Davis
163. William Pinfold
164. Pearse Wright
165. Jacob Roberts
166. William Williams
167. Edward Wells
168. John Cockram
169. Joseph Fryers
170. George Rounsivell
171. John Creigh
172. William Roberts
173. Matthew Reveire
174. Joseph Michelbro
175. Robert Bass
176. James Kerr
177. Edward Kerr
178. **Thomas Williamson**
179. **Thomas Chandler**
180. **Samuel Moodey**
181. William Spencer
182. William Hunt
183. Nathaniel Hudson
184. William Smith
185. Adonijah Stanbury
186. Edward Bead
187. Edward Parmyter
188. **Thomas Stoneham**
189. **John Crew**
190. William Edmundson
191. Richard Hawks
192. Andrew Daws
193. Thomas Pearse
194. Richard Ward
195. Henry Glinn
196. Leigh Ashworth
197. Dominic Dwoouby
198. George Chissom
199. David Turner
200. Clois Derickson
201. Thomas Bradley
202. Thomas Emly
203. Nicholas Woodall
204. Edward Hays
205. Christopher Peters
206. John Jackson
207. Charles Whitehead
208. Edward Arrowsmith
209. John Perrin
**Bold** names indicate 19 pirates who resumed piracy while Pearse was present.

A more successful attempt occurred in 1718 when the new governor and former privateer, Woodes Rogers, arrived in Nassau with a fleet of several ships, bringing with him the authority to grant the King's Pardon. Among those who accepted was Benjamin Hornigold, and, in a shrewd move, Rogers commissioned Hornigold to hunt down and capture those pirates who refused to surrender and accept the royal pardon. As a former privateer himself, Hornigold was well placed to understand what needed to be done, and he pursued his former comrades with zeal. Although pirates such as Charles Vane and Blackbeard evaded capture, Hornigold did take ten pirates prisoner and on the morning of 12 December 1718, nine of them were executed. This act re-established British control and ended the pirates' republic in the Bahamas. Those pirates who had fled successfully continued their piratical activities elsewhere in the Caribbean in what has become known as the Golden Age of Piracy.

== Code of conduct ==
The pirates ran their affairs using what was called the pirate code, which was the basis of their claim that their rule of New Providence constituted a kind of republic. According to the code, the pirates ran their ships democratically, sharing plunder equally and selecting and deposing their captains by popular vote. Many of the pirates were privateers out of work since the end of the Queen Anne's War and ex-sailors who had revolted against the conditions on merchant and naval ships.

Members of the republic came from various backgrounds. Africans could be equal members of the crew, and several people of mixed European and African descent became pirate captains. Some of the pirates were also Jacobites, who had become pirates to help restore the recently deposed Stuart line to the throne. A few female pirates like Anne Bonny and Mary Read were also present.

== Famous members ==
- Benjamin Hornigold: A former privateer turned to piracy in the aftermath of the War of the Spanish Succession, seeing great opportunity in the Bahamas to intercept Spanish and French shipping. He was one of the founder of the Flying Gang but faced decreased popularity due to his dislike of attacking British vessels. When in September 1717 King George I issued a proclamation granting royal pardon for all piracies committed, Hornigold, who regularly regarded himself as more a privateer than a pirate, defected and became a pirate hunter under Governor Rogers.
- Henry Jennings: The Flying Gang's co-founder, Henry Jennings, started his infamous pirating career after the War of the Spanish Succession and his fearsome reputation developed after one venturous raid in July, 1715, when he and others attacked a Spanish salvage camp full of treasure from the 1715 Treasure Fleet. He became the unofficial governor of Nassau and received a formal pardon from Governor of Bahamas, Woodes Rogers. Henry Jennings was an unusual pirate because he lived to enjoy retirement.
- Josiah Burgess: Alongside Benjamin Hornigold and Henry Jennings, Burgess was among the most influential pirates in Nassau in early 1717. That September King George offered a pardon to all pirates who surrendered within a year. Captain Vincent Pearse of HMS Phoenix sailed to the Caribbean in March 1718 to deliver the news and over 200 pirates surrendered, including Burgess.
- Edward Teach: more famously known as Blackbeard, he may be the most legendary and terrifying pirate from the Golden Age of Piracy. Teach would wear three pistols across his chest and put lit matches under his hat to create a terrifying mist, creating a notorious and fearsome look about him. In November 1717, Teach attacked a French merchant vessel La Concorde off the coast of Saint Vincent. He took the ship for his own and renamed it Queen Anne's Revenge, equipping it with 40 guns.
- Charles Vane: a pirate renowned for his sadistic and cruel ways. He ignored the Pirate code and showed little respect for his fellow crew members, despite his wittiness and skillfulness when it came to sailing. He was merciless towards his prisoners, turning to torture and murder when given the opportunity. Yet, Vane was admired for his great navigating and fighting skills. Vane's piracy career was the most lucrative of any pirate, but it was his ego that eventually cost him his life. Vane was hanged on 29 March 1721 and his body was hung at Gun Bay as a warning to others who defied the law.
- Stede Bonnet: a plantation owner on Barbados before he became a pirate. He became known as the "Gentleman Pirate". He plundered ships on the east coast of America before meeting up with Blackbeard in Nassau. During his battles he was wounded and could not lead, instead he followed Blackbeard and his crew during many successful raids. He and his crew became legendary during an engagement with the Royal Navy that became known as the Battle of Cape Fear River.
- Samuel Bellamy: One of the most successful pirate of the republic who rose to fame after a mutiny to Benjamin Hornigold in 1716. Bellamy earned many names during his time such as "Black Sam", "Prince of Pirates", with his crew being called "Robin Hood's Men". One of his greatest feats was capturing the state-of-the-art slave trade ship, the Whydah Gally.
- Olivier Levasseur: Like so many other Pirates, Olivier Levasseur did not want to stop being a pirate after the end of the War of Spanish Succession. He was called the "Buzzard" for his bold attacks and raids. Levasseur had an enormous treasure that is worth an estimated £1 billion. Allegedly, when he was about to be hanged in 1730, he threw away a cryptogram that he said would lead to his treasure. However, this story did not appear until 1934. Many adventurers and treasure hunters have searched for the treasure, but none have found it.
- Edward England: a sailor who was captured by the pirate captain Christopher Winter and forced to join the crew. He took part in Henry Jennings' expedition for the sunken 1715 Treasure Fleet off the coast of Florida, and then began sailing with Charles Vane in 1718. Other prominent pirates accepting the King's Pardon, England and some of his men sailed for Africa. Along his way he spawned the career of Bartholomew Roberts, among others.

== In popular culture ==
In Assassin's Creed IV: Black Flag, fictional character Edward Kenway helps to seize control of Nassau and establish the pirate republic with other major pirates of the Golden Age of Piracy.

The TV series Black Sails is largely based on the history and famous historical pirate inhabitants of Nassau. Several characters' motivations are rooted in the idea of establishing a true "Republic of Pirates" in Nassau.

The Netflix limited series The Lost Pirate Kingdom (2021) is also based on the exploits and rivalries of the Flying Gang and its members, including Benjamin Hornigold, Samuel Bellamy, Henry Jennings, and Blackbeard.

The 2022 HBO Max series Our Flag Means Death features the Republic of Pirates in multiple episodes, as the location of supporting character Spanish Jackie's tavern.

The Pirate Republic appears as a playable faction in Civilization VII. The faction was added in November 2025 as part of the Tides of Power DLC.

== See also ==
- 1715 Treasure Fleet
- Brethren of the Coast
- Distribution of justice
- Governance in 18th-century piracy – Organization of the pirates of the 18th century
- Jolly Roger
- Libertalia
- Republic of Salé
- Thalassocracy
- Victual Brothers

== Bibliography ==
- Woodard, Colin (2007). The Republic of Pirates: Being the True and Surprising Story of the Caribbean Pirates and the Man who Brought Them Down. New York: Harcourt. p. 383. ISBN 978-0-15-603462-3.
