= John Cockram =

English pirate (d.1719)

John Cockram (Note: Last name occasionally spelled Cockrem. Modern writers often list his first name as "Thomas" though period documents confirm that it was "John".) (fl. 1689–1729) was a pirate, trader, and pirate hunter in the Caribbean, best known for his association with Admiral Benjamin Hornigold.

== History ==
Cockram was among a group of pirates active in the Bahamas, including Benjamin Hornigold, John West, and Daniel Stillwell, who attacked Spanish ships and others from small open boats such as the periagua. On his 1713 cruise he and his small crew “brought back Asian silks, copper, rum, sugar, and silver coins stolen from Spanish vessels off Florida and elsewhere” worth over £2,000. Fed up with Cockram and the other pirates disrupting island trade, Deputy Governor Thomas Walker of the Bahamas tried to put a stop to the piracies, arresting Daniel Stillwell; Hornigold freed him and threatened Walker not to intervene.

After his stint of piracy at sea Cockram became a trader, bringing in goods from Charles Town and other settlements to trade with the pirates in and around New Providence. In March 1714, he married the daughter of another Bahamian trader and pirate supplier, Richard Thompson, and moved to Eleuthera. He set up business with Thompson on Harbour Island. Cockram and Thompson sailed their own trading vessels such as the Richard and John, buying and selling with the pirates directly, and also acted as go-betweens for merchants from Curacao, Boston, and elsewhere.

The pirates operating out of the Bahamas generally left the traders’ ship alone, as they depended on Cockram, Thompson, and others to import ammunition and other provisions. Thompson and Cockram became “the leading black market traders of the Golden Age of Piracy,” despite continuing threats of Royal Navy intervention and Spanish retaliation. King George I offered a pardon to all pirates who surrendered by September 1718; Hornigold, Stilwell, Cockram, and others accepted. Charles Vane refused the pardon, escaping Nassau in a hail of cannon fire. One of the first vessels he looted was Cockram's Richard and John, marooning its captain, Cockram's brother Joseph. Another brother, Philip, had been forced into service by the Spanish as a navigator, and on his release warned of increased Spanish aggression.

Bahamas Governor Woodes Rogers tasked the reformed Hornigold and Cockram with retrieving Vane and other lapsed pirates. Vane's fleet was too strong for them to capture, but they succeeded in apprehending Nicholas Woodall’s sloop Wolf, which had been smuggling supplies to Vane. After their success against Woodall, Rogers sent them out again in late 1718 and this time they captured John Auger. Cockram also produced a map of Harbour Island which Rogers sent back to England. Cockram was still assisting Rogers in 1720, warning him of French collusion with native tribes against the Spanish. In 1721 he was appointed to the Governor's Council, though he was removed from the Council in 1726 when he fled the island to avoid debt collectors.

== In popular culture ==
Cockram appears as a villain in Assassin's Creed IV: Black Flag where he is a member of the Templar Order tasked in locating the sage Bartholomew Roberts. He and Josiah Burgess are assassinated by the protagonist Edward Kenway in order to gain Roberts' trust. He is voiced by Diarmaid Murtagh.

== See also ==
- Francis Leslie, Thomas Nichols, and Josiah Burgess – three other leaders of the pardoned pirates, along with Hornigold.
