= Jean Bonadvis =

- Born: unknown
- Died: 1720
- Occupation: French pirate
- Known for: his involvement with Benjamin Hornigold and John Rackham

Jean Bonadvis (fl. 1717–1720) (Note: Last name also Bondavais, Bonnavee, or Bonnevie; first name occasionally Anglicized as John.) was a French pirate active in the Caribbean. He is best known for his involvement with Benjamin Hornigold and John Rackham ("Calico Jack").

== History ==
Hornigold, working in concert with Captain Napin, had taken the sloop Bennet in April 1717. Hornigold made it his personal ship and sailed back to Nassau to resupply. Bonadvis was there to do the same, and had a reputation for “harshly treating” the locals. Hornigold had forced aboard a surgeon named John Howell some time earlier but had released him on Nassau, Howell having served only under threat. Bonadvis needed a surgeon for his ship Mary Anne and attempted to force Howell to join his crew.

When Bonadvis’ men came to abduct Howell, local merchant William Pindar helped stall them until Howell could escape. He ran to see Richard Noland, a former pirate whom Hornigold had employed as a recruiter and agent on Nassau. Howell claimed "he would rather serve the English than French if he was compelled to make a choice of either," so Noland arranged for Howell to be brought aboard Hornigold's ship again. Bonadvis confronted Hornigold and demanded Howell be turned over; Hornigold left the decision to Howell, who chose to stay on the Bennet. Howell tried to escape more than once but was kept under guard.

By 1718 Bonadvis had accepted the general pardon offered to pirates by King George, along with Hornigold and hundreds more. Hornigold, Bonadvis, and a number of others soon accepted privateering commissions, hunting their fellow pirates who had refused the pardon. Bonadvis then spent some time attacking Spanish shipping; he caught and killed Turn Joe, an Irish captain who'd switched sides to sail for the Spanish. (Note: Turn Joe had attacked three pirates in late 1718, forcing them ashore; one of them was John Auger, whom Hornigold would soon recapture.)

=== Capture of John Rackham ===
Late in 1720 he was sailing alongside Jonathan Barnet (under commission from Governor Nicholas Lawes) when he encountered John Rackham.” Bonadvis approached Rackham's sloop William, which immediately fired on him. Bonadvis retreated and reported Rackham's location to Barnet, who attacked and captured Rackham along with Anne Bonny, Mary Read, and the rest of his crew. Bonadvis’ fate is not recorded.
