= Robert Deal (pirate) =

Caribbean pirate (died 1721)

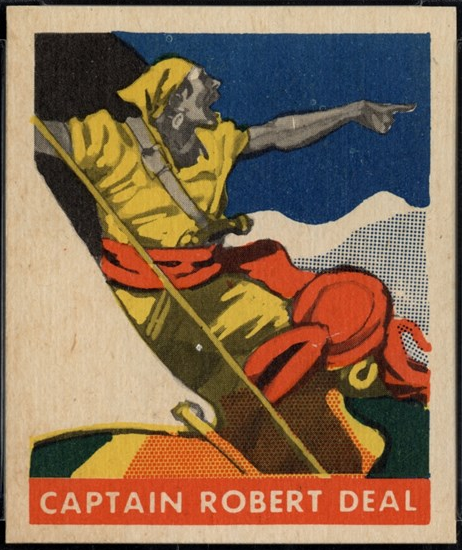
- Pirate Robert Deal, ship's mate under Charles Vane and later Captain
- Died: 1721; Port Royal
- Occupation: Pirate
- Known for: Association with Charles Vane
- Piratical career
- Base of operations: Caribbean

Robert Deal (died 1721) was a pirate active in the Caribbean. He is best known for his association with Charles Vane.

== History ==
Charles Vane refused King George’s offer of pardon to all pirates who surrendered by September 1718, sailing away from Nassau aboard his brigantine with first mate (and former Royal Navy sailor) Robert Deal and quartermaster John Rackham aboard. He tried to convince Blackbeard to join him in retaking Nassau from Governor Woodes Rogers; they met and caroused at Ocracoke Island in October 1718 but Blackbeard declined to join Vane.

Vane’s company looted Eleuthera then captured another brigantine and a sloop, which he kept. In November they spotted a large frigate and approached to capture it but were met with a full cannon broadside from what turned out to be a French man-of-war. Vane, with Deal’s support, ordered a retreat over the objections of Rackham and most of the crew. Once they were clear of the battle, Rackham organized a vote and Vane was deposed. He and Deal were placed in the sloop while Rackham was elected captain of the brigantine.

Vane and Deal fitted out the sloop for piracy, sailing toward Jamaica. They captured two periaguas and another sloop, which Deal took command of. In December they looted three more sloops and sailed for the Bay of Honduras. There they careened their ships, resting and resupplying until February 1719. They put out to sea but were met with a hurricane, where Deal and Vane were separated. Vane’s ship was smashed and he was shipwrecked until rescued by a passing ship; his rescuer recognized him, and hauled him back to Jamaica for trial.

While awaiting his fate, Vane learned that a warship had captured Deal some months earlier. Deal faced trial in January 1721, where he claimed he had accepted the King’s Pardon but it “had been taken from him and torn to pieces by the pirates.” Rogers’ successor Nicholas Lawes found Deal guilty on the testimony of several witnesses, and Deal was hanged at Port Royal. A newspaper report called him "an Old Offender" and said Deal "died very penitent." Vane's own execution followed shortly after.

== See also ==
- Admiralty court, the venue in which Deal and Vane were tried.
- Nicholas Woodall, another of Vane's associates who was caught by pirate hunters
