= Francis Leslie =

- Occupation: Pirate
- Years active: 1717–1718
- Piratical career
- Base of operations: Caribbean

Francis Leslie (fl. 1717-1718, last name occasionally Lesley) was a pirate active in the Caribbean. He is best known as one of the leaders of the "Flying Gang" of pirates operating out of New Providence.

== History ==
As part of a plan to reduce piracy in the Caribbean, in September 1717 King George offered a general pardon to pirates, forgiving any who surrendered within a year. The message reached the American colonies but was slow to reach the Caribbean, so on his own initiative Captain Vincent Pearse of HMS Phoenix sailed to Nassau to deliver the offer personally. In early 1718 Leslie was among a group of pirate “commanders and ringleaders” including Benjamin Hornigold, Josiah Burgess, and Thomas Nichols, who urged Pearse to release Charles Vane and other captured pirates as an incentive for the others to surrender. Pearse agreed, and Leslie and over 200 others accepted the King’s Pardon. Technically only colonial governors could grant the pardons, so Leslie, Nichols, and a few others sailed to Bermuda to surrender to Governor Benjamin Bennett, who had sent his son to deliver the offer of pardon as well.

Leslie wrote a polite letter to Bennett:

New Providence Jany ye 7th 1717 (Note: Until 1752, the New Year was calculated from Lady Day on March 25; here Leslie records the date as 1717, though by modern reckoning the actual year would have been 1718.)

May it please your ExceIly, Most humbly asking Pardon for my rudeness in troubling you at this present but being obligated thereto by your great Clemency in sending your son with that most welcome News of his Majties most gracious Pardon which I humbly accept of, the Gentleman your son can Inform yor Excellency of my affairs in this place which will soon be over and then I hope to partake of your Excellency's clemency, which shall be by the hearty desire of him who is,

Yor Excellys most humble and obedient Servant,

F. Leslie

== See also ==
- Woodes Rogers, Governor of the Bahamas who delivered and enforced the King's Pardon
