= Charles Yeats =

Caribbean pirate

- Years active: 1718
- Known for: Sailing alongside and then abandoning Charles Vane
- Piratical career
- Base of operations: Caribbean
- Commands: Katherine

Charles Yeats (fl. 1718, last name occasionally Yeates, first name rarely John) was a pirate active in the Caribbean. He is best known for sailing alongside and then abandoning Charles Vane.

== History ==
Woodes Rogers and his fleet arrived at New Providence in the Bahamas in the summer of 1718 with the goal of eradicating piracy. Rogers came bearing the King’s Pardon for any pirates who surrendered by September 1718, with a warning of reprisal for those who refused. Hundreds of pirates accepted but Charles Vane was defiant. Rogers’ ships blocked the harbor entrance to in July. Vane fitted out his vessel as a fireship and sent it towards Rogers’ fleet, who broke formation to avoid the fireship. Vane and his men in the meantime commandeered the Katherine from fellow pirate Charles Yeats and escaped in the confusion.

A few days later Vane captured a sloop and placed Yeats aboard as Captain, on the condition that Yeats continue to sail with him. After looting a number of ships in the Caribbean they sailed to Charles Town in the Province of South Carolina. Late that August they plundered several ships as they traveled to and from the harbor, taking supplies, cargo, and slaves.

Yeats had never been happy under Vane’s command: Vane had declined to capture several promising ships, and had treated Yeats’ sloop as a tender and storeship and Yeats himself as a subordinate. Vane captured a ship carrying slaves from Guinea, placing 90 of them aboard Yeats’ sloop, further angering Yeats. In early September 1718 while anchored off Sullivan’s Island Yeats broke from Vane, sailing his sloop into the Edisto River. Vane tried to give chase and they exchanged a broadside once he got in cannon range but gave up the pursuit and sailed away.

Yeats sent a message to Charles Town, notifying them of their cargo and announcing their willingness to surrender if they were granted pardons. The slave-ship’s owner reclaimed the captured slaves while Yeats and his men were granted pardons. Vane waited a while for Yeats to reappear but ultimately left the area, evading William Rhett’s pirate hunters out of Charles Town (who found and captured Stede Bonnet instead). Vane was also able to evade Benjamin Hornigold - who had turned from pirate to pirate hunter after accepting Rogers’ pardon - before sailing north to meet Blackbeard. There are no further records of Yates after his pardon.
