= John West (pirate) =

Caribbean pirate

- Occupation: Pirate
- Years active: 1713-1714
- Known for: Association with Benjamin Hornigold
- Piratical career
- Base of operations: Caribbean

John West (active 1713-1714) was a minor pirate in the Caribbean, best known for his association with Benjamin Hornigold.

== History ==
Little is known of John West's life. In 1713 he led one of several small pirate bands attacking the Spanish from their bases in the Bahamas. Hornigold, West, Daniel Stillwell, and John Cockram used canoes and open periauger boats and crews of two dozen men to raid off Cuba and Florida. After several months of raiding they sailed back to Nassau with over £13,000 in loot; West's included slaves from a Cuban plantation. Stilwell was imprisoned but freed by Hornigold while Cockram married and became a trader and supplier to the pirates. West's fate is not known; amid late 1714 rumours of Spanish retaliation, he may have fled to Jamaica after sharing out the group's collected plunder.

== See also ==
- New Providence, base of Hornigold's "Flying Gang" pirates in the Bahamas.
