= Captain Napin =

Caribbean pirate

- Jolly Roger flag of pirate captain Napin (Napping), described as "in his flag a death's head and an hourglass."
- Died: 1718
- Other name: Napping
- Years active: 1717-18
- Known for: Sailing alongside Benjamin Hornigold
- Piratical career
- Base of operations: Caribbean and off the American east coast

Captain Napin (died 1718, first name unknown, last name occasionally Napping) was a pirate active in the Caribbean and off the American east coast. He is best known for sailing alongside Benjamin Hornigold.

== History ==
Little is recorded of Napin's early life. In April 1717 he was sailing alongside Benjamin Hornigold. They plundered several vessels in quick succession off Puerto Bello and Jamaica until they were chased away by HMS Winchelsea near Cuba. Napin parted from Hornigold by the summer of 1717, though he continued to sail with Hornigold sporadically until that October.

Nathaniel Brooker of the snow Restoration reported being attacked in August 1717 by Napin and Thomas Nichols while sailing from London to Boston (Hornigold was not present). The pirates released Restoration after looting it of everything from provisions and trade goods to kettles and frying pans. Brooker described Napin's jolly roger flag: he "had in his flag a death’s head and an hourglass." Napin and his 12-gun, 100-man sloop were also behind a solo attack on a pink named Adventure in September, and a ship's tender off of Trinidad in October.

Captain Vincent Pearse of HMS Phoenix sailed to Nassau in early 1718 to bring news of King George I's general pardon for pirates for those who surrendered by September. Nichols and Hornigold accepted the pardon; Pearse wrote that "there is an other Sloop out Commanded by Capt. Napping they expect in Dayly" but Napin never arrived to accept the pardon. There are few records of Napin's activities after he was reported as sailing between Brazil and the African coast in March 1718.

In late 1718 a group of sailors led by Thomas Bowling were captured by Spanish guarda costa privateers off Cuba. They were eventually released but were forced to leave one man behind. A later report arrived stating that "It seems one of them [the Spanish ships] comanded by Diego Philippe carried out Napping who was taken with Capt. Bowling and put him ashore on St. Andrews Island, sending him off with his gunner and two negroes arm'd, and one of the three then shot Napping, the fire of the pistol being plainly seen by many of the sloop's company." Governor Woodes Rogers confirmed his death, noting that "Napping was murder'd, for his skull is brought hither and his bones buri'd by the Englishmen yt.[that] was left on Andrew's Island."
