= Josiah Burgess =

English pirate

- Born: c. 1689; Kingdom of England
- Died: 1719; Abaco, Bahamas
- Occupation: Pirate
- Years active: 1716-1719
- Era: Golden Age of Piracy
- Organization: Flying Gang
- Piratical career
- Base of operations: West Indies
- Commands: Providence

Josiah Burgess (Note: First name occasionally given as Thomas, though period records confirm Josiah.) (c. 1689–1719) was an English pirate active in the Caribbean. He is best known as one of the heads of New Providence's "Flying Gang". (Note: Josiah Burgess should not be confused with pirate Samuel Burgess, who sailed the Indian Ocean with William Kidd and was killed by natives on Madagascar in 1716, after being sent to London for trial and convicted on the testimony of Robert Culliford.)

== History ==
Burgess was leading a pack of four ships near Panama in September 1716. Outgunned by three Royal Navy warships, the Winchelsea, Tryall, and Swift, Burgess and his men went into hiding, and waited until the warships sent crews ashore to gather water. Burgess and his crew then paddled out of hiding, taking the remaining Navymen by surprise, resulting in the capture of the three warships.

Alongside Benjamin Hornigold and Henry Jennings, Burgess was among the most influential pirates in Nassau in early 1717. That September, King George I offered a pardon to all pirates who surrendered within a year. Captain Vincent Pearse of HMS Phoenix sailed to the Caribbean in March 1718 to deliver the news. The "commanders and ringleaders" of the pirates - Burgess, Hornigold, Francis Leslie, and Thomas Nichols - implored Pearse to release Charles Vane and other prisoners as an enticement to the other gathered pirates. Pearse relented, and over 200 pirates surrendered, including Burgess.

In order to receive the King's Pardon, Burgess sailed his sloop Providence to Charles Town, planning to bring trade goods back to the Bahamas. He was intercepted in May 1718 by Blackbeard, who questioned him about the harbor's resident merchants and naval defenses. Familiar with Burgess from his days sailing with Hornigold, Blackbeard bought Burgess' merchandise and let him go, after which Burgess sailed to Jamaica.

Woodes Rogers arrived in Nassau in July 1718 to re-announce and enforce the King's pardon. He was greeted by the crews of several pardoned pirates, Burgess' former crew among them. Burgess himself returned to Nassau where Rogers employed him as a Justice of the Vice-Admiralty Court and a privateer. In 1719, Burgess' ship was lost at sea off of Abaco, where he drowned. Young sailor and former pirate George Rounsivell also died trying to rescue Burgess; Rogers had pardoned the teenage Rounsivell when he first arrived in Nassau.

== In popular culture ==
Josiah Burgess appears as a minor antagonist in the video game Assassin's Creed IV: Black Flag.

== See also ==
- Admiralty court, the Court which tried Rounsivell and on which Burgess would later serve.
