= Thomas Nichols (pirate) =

18th century pirate

- Piratical career
- Years active: 1717–1718
- Base of operations: Caribbean, American east coast

Jolly Roger flag of pirate Thomas Nichols, described as "in his flag a dart and a bleeding heart."

Thomas Nichols (fl. 1717–1718) was a pirate active in the Caribbean and off the American east coast. He is best known as a leader among the "Flying Gang" of pirates operating out of New Providence.

== History ==
Very little is known of Nichols’ life or career. He is recorded as attacking Nathaniel Brooker’s snow Restoration in his 6-gun, 80-man sloop alongside Captain Napin (Napping) in August 1717 en route to Boston, from which the pirates took cargo, sails, rigging, and general goods before releasing it. Brooker described Nichols’ jolly roger flag: he “had in his flag a dart and a bleeding heart.”

King George offered a general pardon to pirates in September 1717, forgiving any who surrendered by September 1718. Captain Vincent Pearse of HMS Phoenix sailed to Nassau to deliver the offer to the Caribbean pirates personally. In early 1718 Nichols was among a group of pirate leaders who urged Pearse to release Charles Vane and other pirates he’d detained as a show of good faith. Pearse did so, and Nichols with Josiah Burgess, Benjamin Hornigold, and hundreds of others accepted the King’s Pardon. Pearse actually had no authority to accept their surrender, so Nichols, Francis Leslie, and a few others instead sailed to Bermuda to surrender to Governor Benjamin Bennett.

The Thomas Nichols who attacked Restoration with Napin and surrendered to Governor Bennett should not be confused with the Thomas Nichols who sailed with Stede Bonnet and was exonerated at trial for having been forced to aid his pirate captors.

== See also ==
- Woodes Rogers, Governor of the Bahamas who delivered and enforced the 1718 King's Pardon.
