= Richard Noland =

Irish pirate

- Other name: Holland
- Occupation: Pirate
- Years active: 1717-1724
- Known for: Sailing with Samuel Bellamy
- Piratical career
- Other names: Nowland
- Type: Guarda costa
- Allegiance: Spanish
- Base of operations: Caribbean
- Commands: Anne Galley
- Battles: War of the Quadruple Alliance

Richard Noland (fl. 1717-1724, last name occasionally Holland or Nowland) was an Irish pirate active in the Caribbean. He was best known for sailing with Samuel Bellamy before working for the Spanish as a privateer.

== History ==
Elected captain of Benjamin Hornigold’s ship after the crew deposed him for refusing to attack the English, Samuel Bellamy took a number of vessels including the slave ship Whydah. Bellamy chose it as his flagship, and after capturing three more ships in April 1717, appointed his quartermaster Richard Noland as captain of the prize Anne Galley; Bellamy's former quartermaster Paulsgrave Williams had earlier received a consort ship of his own to command, the Marianne. Bellamy was caught in a storm off Cape Cod; he and the Whydah were lost at sea, while Noland and the others split up and departed.

Noland, who had originally been part of Hornigold’s crew during the War of Spanish Succession, had taken aboard all of Bellamy’s men who still wanted to continue piracy. He turned the Anne Galley south, looting a number of vessels on his way to the Caribbean. He may have transferred from the Anne to a captured sloop after Bellamy failed to rendezvous with them off Maine. He indicated his intention to take the King’s Pardon offered by Woodes Rogers in 1718, along with Hornigold, Williams, and hundreds of others. He then acted as recruiter for Hornigold on Nassau. While working on Nassau he was approached by surgeon John Howell, who begged for protection from pirate Jean Bonadvis who wanted to force him into his service. Noland helped Howell escape and signed him aboard Hornigold's ship for protection, where Howell had been serving until recently. Afterwards Noland was reported to have retired to lead a respectable life, and testified on behalf of other pirates seeking pardon.

However, by summer 1718 he left the island to sign on with the Spanish. He served with them during the War of the Quadruple Alliance, sailing to the Mediterranean for the Battle of Cape Passaro. Much of the Spanish fleet was captured, but Noland escaped along with fellow Irishman Admiral George Camocke. Afterwards he returned to the Caribbean as a guarda costa privateer, captaining a ship alongside a Spaniard, Don Benito, with a mixed crew. When the War of the Quadruple Alliance ended in early 1720, English and Spanish officials agreed to return ships captured by each other's privateers; the Spanish at St. Augustine agreed to make restitution "for four prizes brought in by Capt. Richd. Holland, which are the only that were taken." Benito and Noland were still recorded as capturing English vessels through 1724.

== See also ==
- New Providence, home port for Hornigold and other pirates of the "Flying Gang".
- Henry Johnson and Pedro Poleas - another English and Spanish pair who co-captained a pirate vessel.
- Nicholas de Concepcion - Another St. Augustine–based privateer for the Spanish, active at the same time as Noland.
