= Spanish ship Nuestra Señora de la Encarnación y Desengaño =

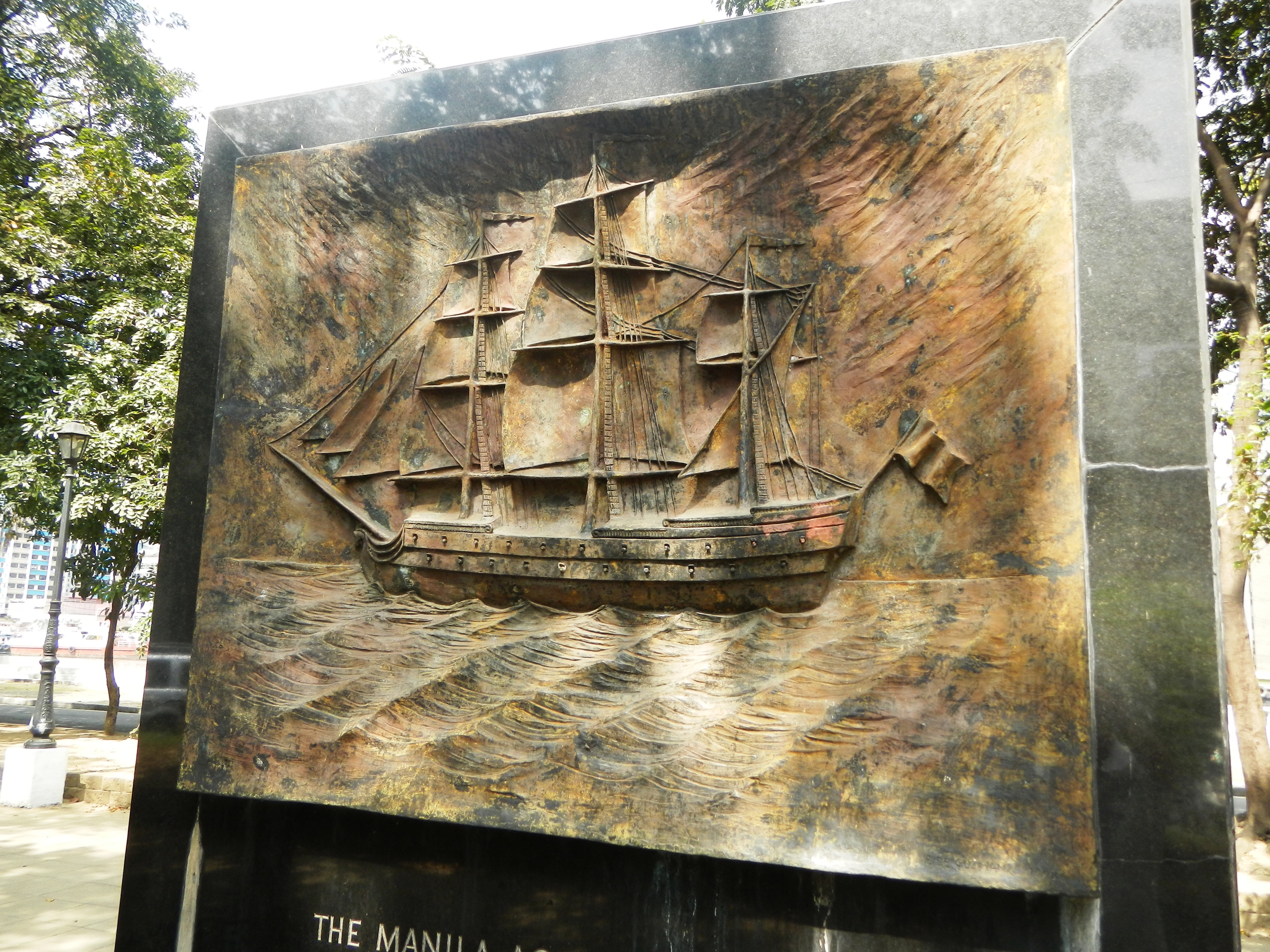
- The Manila-Acapulco Galleon Memorial located at Plaza Mexico in Intramuros, Manila.

History

Spanish Empire
- Namesake: Our Lady of the Incarnation and Heartbreak
- Owner: King Philip V of Spain
- Operator: Viceroyalty of New Spain
- Route: Flota de Manila - Manila, Acapulco de Juárez
- Out of service: 22 December 1709 or 1 January 1710
- Renamed: Bachelor
- Stricken: 1710
- Home port: Manila
- Nickname(s): Desengaño
- Captured: 22 December 1709 or 1 January 1710
- Fate: Captured by Woodes Rogers of Duke

General characteristics
- Class & type: Galleon
- Capacity: 150
- Troops: 120
- Armament: 20 guns

Nuestra Señora de la Encarnación y Desengaño, nicknamed Desengaño, was a Manila galleon which plied the trade routes between the Viceroyalty of New Spain and the Spanish Philippines. The ship was captured on 22 December 1709 by a British privateering expedition led by Woodes Rogers and renamed Bachelor.

== Commission and construction ==
The name Nuestra Señora de la Encarnación y Desengaño translates to "Our Lady of the Incarnation and Heartbreak", in reference to Mary and the birth and death of Jesus.

Desengaño was likely commissioned sometime in the mid-1600s, although the exact date is unknown.

== Service record ==
The ship sailed the route between Acapulco de Juárez, Mexico, and Manila, Philippines, transporting treasure, troops, people, supplies and trade goods between Spain's North American and Asian possessions.

== Capture by privateers ==
Nuestra Señora de la Encarnación y Desengaño, captained by Frenchman Jean Presberty, formerly a French official at Canton, left Manila with a crew of around 193 men, in a convoy as a consort tasked with the escort of the much larger Nuestra Señora de Begoña with a crew of around 450 men captained by Captain General Fernando De Angulo. That Desengaño was captained by a Frenchman was somewhat of an oddity as Imperial Spanish ships of the period were rarely commanded by anyone other than a Spaniard, either a peninsular or a criollo, and is likely attributable to a lack of captains in Manila. Desengaño became separated from Begoña during the course of the passage across the Pacific Ocean. Desengaño continued the journey alone towards the convoy's intended destination at the port of Acapulco.

On 22 December 1709, a British flotilla sighted Desengaño off Cabo San Lucas on its approach to New Spain. The British privateer fleet, commanded by Woodes Rogers, consisted of three ships: Rogers' flagship Duke, Duchess and Marquis, which had herself been captured by Rogers from the French in May 1709. Their officers were William Dampier, pilot of Duke, Stephen Courtney, captain of Duchess, and Edward Cooke, captain of Marquis. The English had been lying in wait for around two months prior to the encounter anticipating that the Manila galleons would traverse the route.

Desengaño was unprepared for battle, having placed all its heavy guns into its hold and therefore only able to respond with small arms and the light calibre guns on deck. The action was brief with the Spanish ship being taken after minimal resistance. At the end of the action, twenty Spanish and nine British lay dead. Several of the English suffered powder burns, with the most serious injury being sustained by Rogers himself when a musket round tore through his jawbone. The Spanish prisoners were all released except for twenty Filipino sailors who were retained as crew and Captain Jean Presberty who was kept as a hostage.

Desengaño's flagship, Begoña arrived in the area a few days later on 25 December 1709 and was immediately engaged by Rogers' squadron. The British failed to take the much better defended Begoña, whose 450-man, 60-gun contingent nearly defeated her attackers. As a result, Rogers was forced to break off the engagement and beat an ignominious retreat. Nuestra Señora de la Encarnación y Desengaño was renamed Bachelor, with Thomas Dover appointed captain and Alexander Selkirk sailing master. The British squadron, including Duke, Duchess, and Bachelor sailed thereafter to England by way of Guam, a Spanish colony at the time.

It is unclear if Desengaño is the same ship that participated in the Battle of La Naval de Manila in 1646.

== Consequences ==
The official inquiry into the incident was heard in 1714 by the Real Audiencia of Manila. The hearing found that Jean Presberty was an inexperienced tactician and mariner who should not have been given command of the vessel. The audiencia further found that a commission should not have been granted to a foreigner. Presberty was also found to be fully culpable for the ship's loss.
