= A Voyage to the South Sea, and Round the World =

1712 book by Edward Cooke

- Title page from the first edition
- Author: Edward Cooke
- Language: English
- Genre: travelogue
- Publisher: B. Lintot and R. Gosling
- Publication date: 1712 (314 years ago)
- Publication place: United Kingdom

A Voyage to the South Sea, and Round the World is a 1712 book by Edward Cooke, about a real-life circumnavigation of the Earth in two ships, under the command of Woodes Rogers. It is notable for including a firsthand account of castaway Alexander Selkirk, whose tale appears to have helped inspire Daniel Defoe to write his 1719 novel, Robinson Crusoe.

== Contents ==
In 1708, two ships set sail from Bristol under command of Woodes Rogers. These were the Duke of Bristol and Dutchess of Bristol. These ships circled the world, trading goods from Europe for goods from various places in the Southern Ocean, the Atlantic Ocean, the Pacific Ocean, and other seas circling the Southern Hemisphere.

Once the journey was over, sailor Edward Cooke (not to be confused with the later Captain Cooke) wrote up an account, in two volumes, that was printed the next year. In it were updated maps, including of the Amazon River, and An Account is given of Mr. Alexander Selkirk, about a man who had been marooned on the uninhabited island of "Más a Tierra" (renamed Robinson Crusoe Island in 1966), for four years and it covered his manner of living being adept at hunting, taming wild beasts and making use of the resources available. Selkirk's story is the inspiration for the 1719 novel, Robinson Crusoe.

This book also covers other topics of interest. Among these are their own privateering (pirating), the expedition of ships capturing many other vessels ostensibly from targets of the English crown, and an early documentation of the Galápagos Islands later made famous by Charles Darwin's The Voyage of the Beagle.

Woodes Rogers wrote his own account, A Cruising Voyage Round the World since narratives of voyages were popular reading material at the time.

== Blackbeard's Queen Anne's Revenge ==
In June of 1718, Queen Anne's Revenge — the ship of famous pirate Blackbeard — ran aground on a sandbar at Beaufort Inlet off the coast of North Carolina and lost until rediscovered in 1996. On November 21, 1996 Intersal Inc., while working under permit from the state of North Carolina, discovered the wrecksite. Intersal, then handed over the wreck to the state of North Carolina in exchange for media and replica rights. As part of the artifact assemblage a breech chamber, likely originally associated with a breech-loading swivel gun, was recovered still loaded with powder and wadding used to make a seal around a tampion. Part of the wadding consisted of fragments of paper. Experts identified seven scraps of that paper as being pages from a copy of Cooke's A Voyage to the South Sea, and Round the World.
