= John Auger =

Pirate active in the Bahamas around 1718

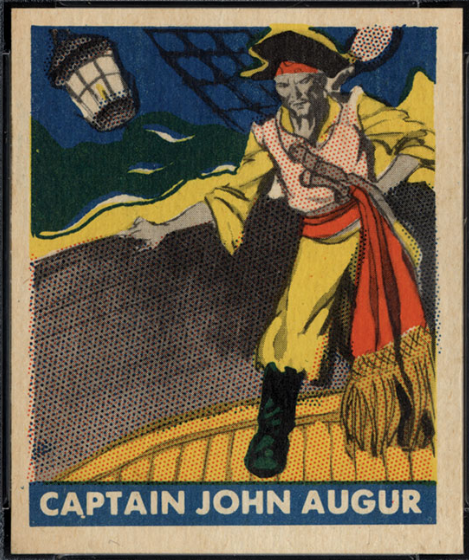
Captain John Auger (Auger/Augier), from the 1948 Leaf Pirates trading card set

John Auger (c. 1678 – 1718, occasionally spelled Augur or Augier) was a pirate active in the Bahamas around 1718. He is primarily remembered for being captured by pirate turned pirate-hunter Benjamin Hornigold.

== History ==
John Auger had been a minor pirate in Nassau; upon hearing Governor Woodes Rogers' offer of the King's Act of Grace pardoning all pirates who surrendered by 1718, he accepted and retired from piracy.

Rogers pardoned Auger ("a steady and respectable old pirate"), entrusted him with a sloop named Mary - owned by a David Soward and outfitted for trading - and allowed him to leave on the sloop Mary with two other ships on a resupply voyage. Soon after, Auger and his crew met with the other vessels at sea, including fellow pardoned pirate Phineas Bunce. Abandoning their trading mission, they reverted to piracy and plundered the two ships. Auger and Bunce debated whether to kill cargo master James Kerr, pilot Richard Turnley, and other officers Rogers had placed on board, but instead voted to maroon them.

Benjamin Hornigold had also accepted Rogers' pardon and had turned to hunting his former pirating comrades. He had been lying in wait for pirate Charles Vane; he captured Vane's accomplice Nicholas Woodall but missed Vane and returned to Nassau, where Rogers sent him after Auger and others in the area. Hornigold captured Auger and his crew later in 1718 after Auger's sloop was attacked by Spanish guarda costa privateer vessels led by Turn Joe, returning them to New Providence in the Bahamas. Rogers had no commission from England to hold an Admiralty Court to try captured pirates. Improvising, he held his own court, sending detailed court records back to England in lieu of waiting for official royal orders.

Auger testified that Phineas Bunce (who died of his injuries before he could be tried) was the mutiny's mastermind and that Auger himself had been "in Liquor" at the time, but could produce no evidence. The Court pardoned one man found to have been forced into piracy and ordered that all of the other pirates should "be hanged by the neck till you shall be dead, dead, dead". Captain Charles Johnson describes Auger's trip to the gallows:

... knowing himself guilty of the Indictment, he all along appeared very penitent, and neither wash'd, shav'd, or shifted his old Cloaths, when carried to be executed; and when he had a small Glass of Wine given him on the Rampart, drank it with Wishes for the good Success of the Bahama Islands and the Governor.

but the virtue of the condemned was firm, and the only consolation the criminals obtained was the advice that "lead their thoughts to the other world and repent of the evils they had committed in this one." "Yes," replied Auger, furious and not ashamed, "I deeply regret not having committed greater evils and not having cut the neck of the comrades who betrayed me, and I regret even more that all of you do not hang up

Auger and his crew had been captured, tried, convicted, and hanged within a year of returning to piracy.

== See also ==
- Josiah Burgess, a former pirate who took a pardon and sat as one of the judges at Auger's trial.
- Phineas Bunce, a pardoned pirate committed crimes with Auger
