= Charles Vane =

English pirate

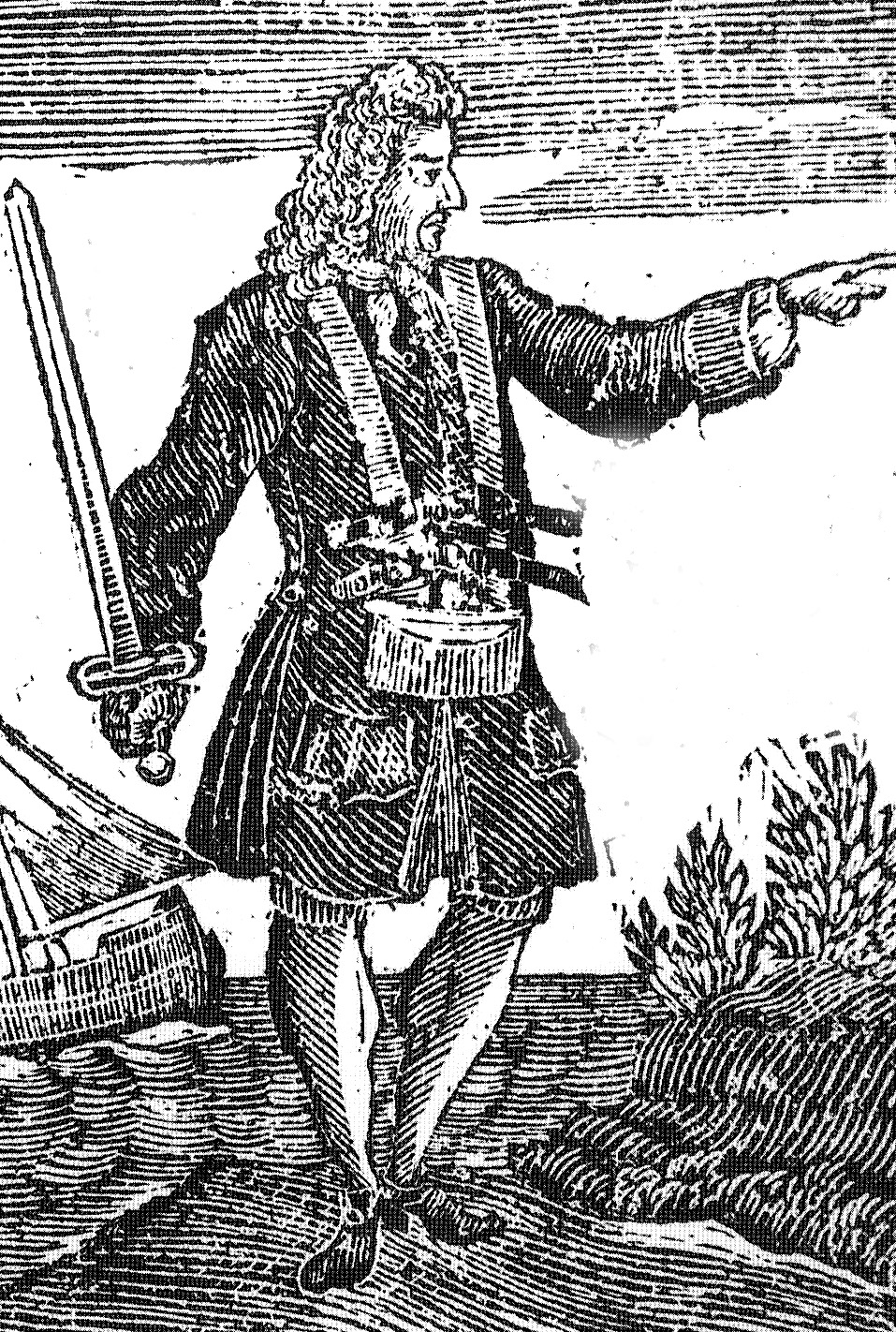
- 1724 woodcut of Vane from A General History of the Pyrates
- Died: 29 March 1721; Port Royal, Colony of Jamaica
- Piratical career
- Type: Pirate
- Allegiance: None
- Years active: 1718–1721
- Rank: Captain
- Base of operations: West Indies
- Commands: Lark; Ranger (six-gun sloop); Katherine (24-gun sloop); Ranger (12-gun brigantine)

Charles Vane (hanged 29 March 1721) was an English pirate who operated in the Bahamas during the Golden Age of Piracy.

Vane’s place of birth is unknown. One of his first pirate ventures was under the leadership of Henry Jennings, during Jennings' attack on the salvage camp for the wrecked Spanish 1715 Treasure Fleet off the coast of Florida. By 1717, Vane was commanding his own vessels and was a notable member of the Flying Gang in Nassau. In 1718, Vane agreed to stop his pirate activities and declared his intention to accept a King's Pardon; however, just months later he and his men, including Edward England returned to piracy. Vane was known for his cruelty, and in court documents is said to have beaten, tortured, and interrogated sailors from ships he captured. In February 1719, Vane was caught in a storm in the Bay Islands and was marooned on an uncharted island. Upon being discovered by a passing British ship, he was arrested and brought to Port Royal where he was eventually tried and hanged in March 1721.

== Pirate career ==
“When he perceiv’d our Sloops chas’d him, he took down his St. George’s Flag and hoisted a black Flag with a Death’s Head in it, which is their signal to intimidate, that they will neither give nor take Quarter”.

Little is known of Vane's early life. He lived in Port Royal before becoming a pirate, but he was most likely not born there. A General History of the Pyrates makes no mention of Vanes early life and neither does his trial transcript. Where he was born is also unknowable.

Vane worked with Henry Jennings during Jennings' attack on the salvage camp for the wrecked Spanish 1715 Treasure Fleet. Vane first operated as an independent captain in the summer of 1717. By the winter of that year, he was one of the leaders of the pirates operating out of Nassau.

When word reached the pirates that King George I of Great Britain had extended an offer of pardon to all pirates who wished to surrender, Vane led the pirates who opposed taking the pardon, which included many with Jacobite leanings. On 23 February 1718, Captain Vincent Pearse arrived at Nassau in HMS Phoenix, in an attempt to get the pirates on the island to surrender. Vane was captured along with his sloop, the Lark. Benjamin Hornigold, Thomas Nichols, and others urged Pearse to release Vane as a show of good faith, which he did. Vane afterwards declared to Pearse that he intended to take the King's pardon. According to Pearse's list, Vane did take the pardon. But on 21 March, Vane and his men (including Edward England), turned pirate again, capturing a Jamaican sloop. Vane sailed back to Nassau and harassed Pearse repeatedly, trading their sloop for the Lark. Vane left Nassau on 4 April. Four days later Pearse left with HMS Phoenix, and Nassau was again controlled by the pirates.

After leaving Nassau, Vane raided ships around the Bahamas. He gained a reputation for cruelty. He and his crew would often beat or torture with matches captured sailors to force them to surrender their valuables. Around this time Vane's crew renamed the Lark, calling it the Ranger.

Vane cruised again in May and June, capturing, among other ships, a 20-gun French ship that became Vane's new flagship.

Vane was back at Nassau on 22 July 1718 when Woodes Rogers reached Nassau to take office as the new governor. Rogers' ships trapped Vane in the harbour. Vane's ship was too large to pass one of the harbour's two entrances, and the other was blocked by Rogers' fleet. That night, Vane turned the French ship into a fireship, setting it on fire and sailing it towards Rogers' ships. The fireship failed to damage any of Rogers' fleet except one, but the ships were forced to pull away, unblocking the channel. Vane commandeered a small 24-gun sloop, the Katherine, and escaped out the smaller entrance as Rogers' ships returned.

Vane took ships off the Bahamas in July, working with Charles Yeats, the original captain of the Katherine. A brigantine that Vane captured became his new flagship. In August he sailed to Charleston and took eight ships there. After seizing a slave ship, he put the slaves aboard Yeats' ship. Yeats sailed off with the slaves and surrendered to the governor of South Carolina in exchange for a pardon. The merchants of Charleston outfitted two sloops to hunt Vane, under the command of William Rhett. Rhett failed to find Vane, but his ships located and captured the pirate Stede Bonnet.

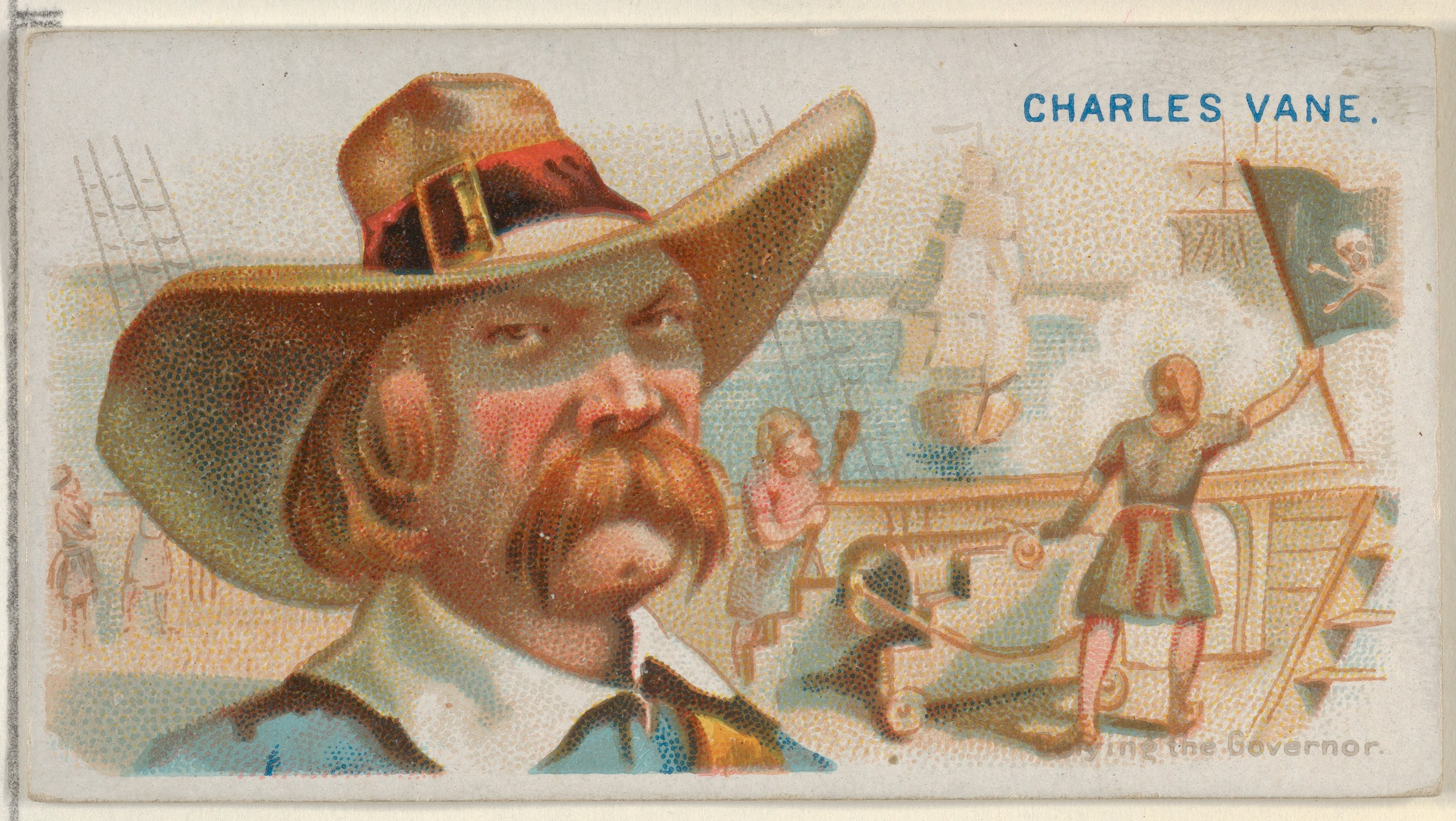
Charles Vane, Defying the Governor, from the Pirates of the Spanish Main series (N19) for Allen & Ginter Cigarettes MET DP835025

In August, Vane careened his ship near Abaco, where his accomplice Nicholas Woodall smuggled him supplies and ammunition. Hornigold had turned pirate-hunter along with his associate John Cockram and followed Vane, who escaped. Hornigold and Cockram instead captured Woodall, who was imprisoned by Rogers.

Vane returned to Nassau in September to marry, threatening to retake the city. In October, Vane sailed to Ocracoke Inlet and met with Blackbeard, perhaps attempting to convince Blackbeard to join forces with him. The two crews celebrated for several days but split up afterwards.

In October, Vane raided Eleuthera, carrying away liquor and livestock. On 23 November, Vane spotted a large frigate but when he hoisted the Jolly Roger the frigate replied by raising a French naval ensign and opening fire. Vane's brigantine and sloop were outgunned and he ordered a retreat. Vane's crew saw this as an act of cowardice. He was voted out of command in favour of his quartermaster who is not named. Vane and 16 others who supported him, including his first mate Robert Deal, were put on the sloop.

== Capture and Death ==
Vane sailed to the Bay Islands, capturing sloops along the way, one of which Deal took command of. In February 1719, Vane and Deal were caught in a hurricane and separated. Vane was wrecked on an uninhabited island. When English ships arrived to collect water near the island, Vane tried to join one of the crews under a false name. He was recognized by an old acquaintance and arrested.

Vane was taken to Spanish Town, Jamaica and held in prison for many months. On 22 March 1721, he was tried for piracy and found guilty. Vane learned that Deal had been tried, convicted, and hanged sometime earlier. Vane was sentenced to death, and on 29 March he was hanged at Gallows Point in Port Royal. His corpse was hung in chains at Gun Cay.

== In popular culture ==
W. Morgan Sheppard portrayed Vane in the 1999 family film Treasure of Pirate's Point.

Vane appears as a side character and minor antagonist in the 2013 video game Assassin's Creed IV: Black Flag, in which he was voiced by Ralph Ineson.

Zach McGowan portrayed Charles Vane in the Starz television series Black Sails (2014–2017).

Tom Padley plays Vane in six episodes of the 2021 Netflix docuseries The Lost Pirate Kingdom.

Jack Galloway play Charles vane in the 2006 tv-movie Blackbeard: Terror at Sea.
