= 1717–1718 Acts of Grace =

Proclamations promising pardons for acts of piracy

The 1717 proclamation as it appeared in The London Gazette

The Proclamation for Suppressing of Pirates (also known simply as the Act of Grace, though not an Act of Parliament) (Note: In the context of contemporary piracy, the pardon is often simply called the King's Pardon.) was a royal proclamation issued by George I of Great Britain on 5 September 1717. It promised a pardon for acts of piracy committed before the following 5 January, to those pirates who surrendered themselves to the correct authority before a deadline. Originally, the surrender had to occur on or before 5 September 1718; this was later extended by a second proclamation to 1 July 1719.

The proclamation also included bounties for the capture of pirates who failed to surrender before the deadline, as well as offering rewards for pirate crew members who facilitated the capture of their captains.

In December 1718, a further extension of the deadline was suggested, in hopes of dissuading pirates from entering Spanish service during the War of the Quadruple Alliance.

== Background ==
=== Precedent ===
Kings James I, James II and William III issued similar pardons or proclamations in the prior century.

==== Pardons under James I ====
With the end of the first Anglo-Spanish war under James I, and the corresponding end to English privateering in 1603, English sailors resorted to piracy. In 1611, Captain Richard Bishop became one of the first notable pirates to be pardoned, having surrendered partly due to qualms about attacking English ships. He was allowed to keep his plunder. (Note: Senior writes that it is unclear whether Bishop was allowed to keep all his plunder.)

In 1611, the English government was willing to offer a general pardon to pirates, on condition that they surrender their ships and goods. The following year, the privy council of James I offered a general pardon without this condition. At least 12 pirate crews surrendered to the general pardon, though a large portion of Baughe's crew would shortly return to piracy. Captain Roger Middleton, who sailed first to Ireland then to Mehdya to deliver the pardon, extracted bribes from pirates in exchange for their pardon.

The lack of competing pirates in Ireland due to the general pardon saw Henry Mainwaring become notorious in 1613 as leader of a pirate fleet. He would receive offers from Tuscany, Savoy, Tunis and Spain of a pardon should he surrender; however, consistent with his not attacking English ships, in June 1616 he instead accepted an English offer of pardon, having sought one since the previous year (as too had Lording Barry).

Clive Senior suggests that the government had an incentive to pardon pirates, since this would keep these potentially useful seamen available in case of war.

==== Proclamations of 1687–1688 ====
Around the 1670s, an expedition to suppress piracy in the Spanish West Indies using pardons was planned, but never went ahead.

On 22 May 1687, James II renewed the proclamation for the suppression of pirates, offering a limited time in which any pirate who surrendered would receive a pardon. That August, he commissioned Sir Robert Holmes to suppress piracy in a squadron sent to the West Indies. On 20 January 1688, (Note: The year officially began on 25 March until 1752, so this is sometimes (and contemporarily) dual dated or recorded as the previous year.) James II issued a proclamation (offering pardons to pirates who surrendered to Holmes or to an appointee of his) in order to ensure that colonial governors would cooperate with Holmes and his agents. Holmes' fleet achieved a temporary reduction in piracy, but the number of pirates had increased again by 1693.

==== 1698 proclamation ====
On 8 December 1698, William III issued a proclamation offering pardons to pirates east of the Cape of Good Hope who surrendered to Captain Thomas Warren. Henry Every and William Kidd were specifically exempted from receiving this pardon.

By the time that Warren arrived in Madagascar, the Act of Grace had expired. By promising to extend the deadline for surrender, Warren obtained the surrender of Robert Culliford, among others; however, these pirates were taken to trial and all except Culliford were hanged. The fact that pirates such as Joseph Bradish and those in Kidd's company were not offered amnesty by the authorities contributed to scepticism regarding acts of grace, including among the crew of Bartholomew Roberts more than two decades later.

=== Peace of Utrecht ===
With armistices in 1712, followed by the Peace of Utrecht in 1713, the state of war (which had existed since 1702 as part of the War of the Spanish Succession) between England/Great Britain on one side and France and Spain on the other came to an end. Employment for sailors became difficult to find and poorly paid, as privateering commissions became useless and as the Royal Navy discharged over 36,000 men (nearly three-quarters of those it had employed). In spite of the peace, Spanish guarda costa continued to seize English ships (based on their possession of Spanish coin), harming and imprisoning English sailors, as well as discouraging the merchant shipping which would otherwise have offered legitimate employment. This led some sailors to resort to piracy.

=== Anti-piracy campaign ===
In 1715, a Royal Navy anti-piracy campaign began in earnest. No pirate ships were captured till 1717, the year that HMS Scarborough caused the destruction of a pirate galley and a sloop near Saint Croix, but failed to capture the crew. At this time, some 20–30 pirate vessels remained at sea.

The reasons for the campaign's ineffectiveness till 1718 included the vastness of the seas in which pirates operated, pirates' better knowledge of those seas, outdated intelligence, and a desire to cut costs (which resulted in a lack of ships, maintenance and seamen). The campaign's initial lack of success saw the British government resort to offering pardons to pirates by issuing the proclamation of 1717.

== 1717 proclamation ==
=== Support for a pardon ===
For several months, piracy in the West Indies – particularly around Jamaica – had been such a problem for the merchants and masters of ships of Bristol that they petitioned the king for its suppression. Following receipt of this petition, in May 1717, Secretary of State Joseph Addison asked the Council of Trade and Plantations to recommend to the king how best to achieve this. Having consulted merchants and other interested parties, the council agreed that the issue was urgent, replying that "the whole trade from Great Britain to those parts" was "in imminent danger of being lost". The council heard that piracy even reached the seas near the northern continent, and that at least one fourth-rate or two fifth-rates were required to suppress it. In addition, the consultees proposed a royal pardon for pirates who surrendered themselves; the council hoped that this would reform the pirates into law-abiding subjects. Finally, the council recommended that the Bahamas be settled and fortified to prevent pirates from sheltering there.

Meanwhile, in Virginia, Lieutenant-Governor Alexander Spotswood recommended reducing the number of pirates either by force (to serve as a deterrent), or by offering a pardon to those who would submit – although he doubted that all the pirates would accept such an offer.

In August 1717, soon-to-be Governor of Jamaica Nicholas Lawes advocated both royal clemency and an increased presence of warships to reduce the number of pirates and protect Jamaican trade. The pirates themselves threatened to attack Bermuda and (according to Lieutenant-Governor Bennett) "make a new Madagascar of it" if they were not offered a pardon, communicating this through the masters of captured ships.

=== Contents ===
Following a justification for the proclamation, the text defines who it is pirates may surrender to and by what date.

We do hereby Promise and Declare, That in case any of the said Pirates shall, on or before the Fifth Day of September, in the Year of our Lord One thousand seven hundred and eighteen, Surrender him or themselves to One of Our Principal Secretaries of State in Great Britain or Ireland, or to any Governor or Deputy-Governor of any of Our Plantations or Dominions beyond the Seas, every such Pirate and Pirates, so Surrendring him or themselves, as aforesaid, shall have Our Gracious Pardon of and for such his or their Piracy or Piracies, by him or them Committed before the Fifth Day of January next ensuing.

— King George I, A Proclamation for Suppressing of Pirates

The proclamation also defined the following bounties for the capture of pirates who failed to surrender before the deadline.

We do hereby further Declare, That in case any Person or Persons, on or after the Sixth Day of September, One thousand seven hundred and eighteen, shall Discover or Seize, or cause or procure to be Discovered or Seized, any One or more of the said Pirates, so neglecting or refusing to Surrender themselves, as aforesaid, so as they may be brought to Justice, and Convicted of the said Offence, such Person or Persons, so making such Discovery or Seizure, or causing or procuring such Discovery or Seizure to be made, shall have and receive as a Reward for the same, viz. For every Commander of any Pirate- Ship or Vessel the Sum of One hundred Pounds; For every Lieutenant, Master, Boatswain, Carpenter, and Gunner, the Sum of Forty Pounds; For every Inferior Officer the Sum of Thirty Pounds; And for every Private Man the Sum of Twenty Pounds.

— King George I, A Proclamation for Suppressing of Pirates

It further offered the following rewards for pirate crew members facilitating the capture of their captains.

And if any Person or Persons, belonging to, and being Part of the Crew of any such Pirate-Ship or Vessel, shall, on or after the said Sixth Day of September, One thousand seven hundred and eighteen, Seize and Deliver, or cause to be Seized or Delivered, any Commander or Commanders of such Pirate-Ship or Vessel, so as that he or they be brought to Justice, and convicted of the said Offence, such Person or Persons, as a Reward for the same, shall receive for every such Commander the Sum of Two hundred Pounds; which said Sums the Lord Treasurer, or the Commissioners of Our Treasury for the time being, are hereby required and directed to Pay accordingly.

— King George I, A Proclamation for Suppressing of Pirates

== 1718 proclamation ==
=== Support for a new proclamation ===
Given the preparation of commissions to pardon acts of piracy which had occurred before 23 July 1718 (as opposed to 5 January, as in the original proclamation), that month the Council of Trade and Plantations directed governors to issue proclamations with this new date, and suggested that the king do the same. On 9 December, the council also recommended a further extension of the date, hoping to dissuade pirates from entering Spanish service during the War of the Quadruple Alliance.

== Response ==
Locations of Bermuda, Charles Town, Jamaica, London and New Providence

=== Legal opinion ===
In November 1717, Attorney General Edward Northey and Solicitor General William Thomson provided their legal opinion regarding the proclamation:

1. The proclamation did not contain a pardon, but promised one;
2. Murders committed during acts of piracy could be pardoned;
3. Pirates would not have to forfeit their property, but property taken unlawfully could be retaken by its lawful owner;
4. No pirate who surrendered before the deadline was excepted from the promise of a pardon.

Furthermore, by late February 1718, it was decided that governors would require a commission under the Great Seal in order to grant royal pardons as promised by the proclamation. Such commissions were ordered and prepared that July; in addition, governors were then permitted to pardon acts of piracy which occurred before 23 July 1718 (as opposed to the original date of 5 January 1718). (Lt. Governor Spotswood and Governor Rogers received commissions for which this date was 18 August.) In the days following the 1718 proclamation, updated commissions were once again ordered and sent.

=== New Providence ===
When news of the proclamation reached Bermuda, Lieutenant-Governor Benjamin Bennett sent his son in December 1717 to the Republic of Pirates on New Providence. The arrival of Bennett's son with copies of the proclamation caused the pirates there to divide into two factions, depending on whether they planned to accept the pardon. The faction rejecting the pardon included Jacobites, and was led by Charles Vane. Those rejecting the pardon supported fortifying the island, as did those wishing to secure their plunder, but when a general council was called, no action was agreed on.

While the Jacobites sought support from George Camocke, other pirates sailed to nearby British colonies to receive a pardon, including Henry Jennings and around 150 others who sailed to Bermuda, most of whom would return to piracy. The likes of Christopher Condent, Christopher Winter and Nicholas Brown fled New Providence, with Winter and Brown sailing to Spanish Cuba.

On 23 February 1718, Captain Vincent Pearse arrived at Nassau, having sailed from New York on HMS Phoenix. Pearse's crew was informed of how to find Vane by pirates intending to accept the pardon. Although Vane's crew was apprehended and his sloop, the Lark, taken, pirates Hornigold, Leslie, Burgess and Nichols persuaded Pearse to release Vane and his crew as a show of good faith.

Though Pearse lacked the authority to issue pardons, he offered signed certificates to pirates who would surrender to him. 209 accepted this offer, less than half of the pirates on New Providence. Pearse produced a list of their names:

**List of pirates on New Providence who surrendered to Captain Pearse**
1. Parker Adams
2. Arthur Allen
3. James Coates
4. John Dalrymple
5. Benjamin Hornigold
6. Josiah Burgess
7. Francis Leslie
8. Thomas Nichols
9. Paulsgrave Williams
10. John Lewis
11. Richard Noland
12. John Martin
13. William Connor
14. Thomas Grahame
15. Thomas Terrell
16. John Ealling
17. Robert Wishort
18. James Gratrick
19. Edward Stacey
20. John Fennet
21. John Hunt
22. John Pearse
23. James Bryan
24. Henry Berry
25. Thomas Lamb
26. John Allen
27. Martin Carroll
28. Thomas Clies
29. John Kipperson
30. John Charlton
31. Francis Charnock
32. **David Merredith**
33. **Edward Nowland**
34. **James Goodson**
35. Dennis McCarthy
36. Rowld Barton
37. George Gador
38. George Mann
39. Richard Richards
40. Anthony Jacobs
41. Nabel Clarke
42. Henry Hawkins
43. Daniel White
44. Edward Savory
45. Peter Marshall
46. **Archibald Murry**
47. Daniel Hill
48. William Davey
49. Richard Taylor
50. Martin Townsend
51. **Michl. Scrimshaw**
52. Samuel Richardson
53. Robert Brown
54. Henry Cheek
55. Robert Hunter
56. James Moodey
57. Richard Kaine
58. Thomas Birdsale
59. Robert Dryker
60. **Daniel Carman**
61. **John Dunkin**
62. Geo Feversham
63. John Barker
64. Thomas Codd
65. William Roberts
66. John Waters
67. William Austin
68. Francis Roper
69. Griffith Williams
70. Edward German
71. John Clarke
72. **Richard Bishop**
73. Henry Barnes
74. Daniel Champeon
75. John [B/R]owell
76. William Willis
77. Tristram Wilson
78. Daniel Jones
79. Phillip Calvorley
80. James Brown
81. John Sutton
82. George Raddon
83. Adam Forbes
84. Cornelius Mahon
85. Thomas Pearse
86. David Ross
87. **Jacob Johnson**
88. William Bridges
89. Robert Brown
90. Rt. Moggridge
91. Henry Shipton
92. John Cullomore
93. Peter Johnson
94. Charles Morgan
95. John Auger
96. William South
97. Marmaduke Gee
98. James Morvat
99. Benjamin Turner
100. John Mutlow
101. John Stout
102. Thomas Reynolds
103. James Wheeler
104. Alexander Lyell
105. William Rouse
106. Joseph Clapp
107. Peter Goudet
108. Mark Holmes
109. Daniel Stillwell
110. John Edwards
111. Charles Garrison
112. Joseph Pearse
113. William Grahame
114. Alexander Campbell
115. James Nevill
116. James Fasset
117. Edward Berry
118. John Andrews
119. **David Nearne**
120. Garrt. Peterson
121. Richard Divelly
122. **Charles Vane**
123. Roger Houghton
124. Richard Valentine
125. Samuel Bryce
126. Richard Legatt
127. Richard Rawlings
128. Darby Connelly
129. Arthur Van Pelt
130. John Richards
131. Samuel Beach
132. William Peters
133. John Smith
134. George Sinclair
135. William Hasselton
136. William Harris
137. William Chow
138. Abraham Adams
139. Joseph Thompson
140. James Peterson
141. Peter Mallet
142. William Titso
143. John Arterile
144. **John Mounsey**
145. John Johnson
146. John Poley
147. John Farrow
148. Samuel Addy
149. John Magness
150. Thomas Trouton
151. Edward Miller
152. Daniel Swoord
153. Richard Earle
154. Anthony Kemp
155. John Carye
156. Robert Shear
157. **John Mitchele**
158. **Edward Rogers**
159. Michl. Rogers
160. John Kemp
161. John Sipkins
162. Othenius Davis
163. William Pinfold
164. Pearse Wright
165. Jacob Roberts
166. William Williams
167. Edward Wells
168. John Cockram
169. Joseph Fryers
170. George Rounsivell
171. John Creigh
172. William Roberts
173. Matthew Reveire
174. Joseph Michelbro
175. Robert Bass
176. James Kerr
177. Edward Kerr
178. **Thomas Williamson**
179. **Thomas Chandler**
180. **Samuel Moodey**
181. William Spencer
182. William Hunt
183. Nathaniel Hudson
184. William Smith
185. Adonijah Stanbury
186. Edward Bead
187. Edward Parmyter
188. **Thomas Stoneham**
189. **John Crew**
190. William Edmundson
191. Richard Hawks
192. Andrew Daws
193. Thomas Pearse
194. Richard Ward
195. Henry Glinn
196. Leigh Ashworth
197. Dominic Dwoouby
198. George Chissom
199. David Turner
200. Clois Derickson
201. Thomas Bradley
202. Thomas Emly
203. Nicholas Woodall
204. Edward Hays
205. Christopher Peters
206. John Jackson
207. Charles Whitehead
208. Edward Arrowsmith
209. John Perrin
**Bold** names indicate 19 pirates who resumed piracy while Pearse was present.

Having already returned to piracy and attacked the crew of the Phoenix, on 4 April, Vane left New Providence on the recaptured Lark. Pearse and the Phoenix left four days later. Vane would return in late April, and again in July.

==== Arrival of Governor Rogers ====
On 24 July 1718, the new Governor of the Bahamas, Woodes Rogers, arrived off Hog Island (near Nassau), along with a series of vessels which included three Royal Navy warships. The following day, Vane left New Providence and escaped this force with Charles Yeats on Yeats' ship Katherine.

When he set foot on New Providence on 27 July, Rogers was welcomed by pro-pardon pirates, including Thomas Walker, Hornigold, and Hornigold's and Josiah Burgess's crews. (Burgess and Hornigold had already been pardoned by this time.) On 1 August, Rogers' new council granted the King's Pardon to some 200 pirates. Edward England, having been among those rejecting the pardon, sailed to Africa after this.

Following its departure on 10 September, the crew of the Buck (a sloop-of-war taken to New Providence by Rogers, now with reformed pirates among its crew) turned pirate. The Buck's new pirate crew included reformed pirates Thomas Anstis and Howell Davis, as well as a man who had come from England aboard the Buck, Walter Kennedy. Moreover, Rogers estimated that 150 pirates had left New Providence between the end of July and late October, including pirates hoping to join Vane. Indeed, that October saw the departure of three sloops, which two days later experienced a mutiny led by pardoned pirates John Auger, Phineas Bunce and Dennis McCarthy.

Due to the threat from both committed pirates and the Spanish (particularly after news of the War of the Quadruple Alliance arrived in March 1719), Rogers employed pardoned ex-pirates as pirate hunters and privateers. These included Hornigold, John Cockram and Burgess. By the end of November 1718, the pirate hunters had captured more than 10 prisoners, including Nicholas Woodall. Eight such previously pardoned prisoners, including Auger and McCarthy, would be hanged that December.

Rogers received a commission to pardon in January 1719. That month, he wrote of his doubts that most remaining pirates would surrender, stating that reducing their numbers would be difficult without a greater presence of naval vessels under a governor's control.

=== Bermuda ===
In February 1718, Lt. Governor Bennett was optimistic about the pardon, reporting that he had been giving certificates to pirates who surrendered, and requesting instructions regarding how to ensure surrendered pirates would receive their pardon. The need for such instructions became more pressing as pirates became impatient to leave Bermuda. The following March, Bennett reported that there were pirates who refused to take the pardon without assurance that they would be allowed to keep their plunder. From March to July, Bennett's worsening predicament was repeatedly relayed to Secretary of State James Craggs by the Council of Trade and Plantations, which also blamed the fact that surrendered pirates were returning to piracy on governors' lack of any power to pardon without a commission. Bennett would receive this commission by the following October.

Around April 1718, Henry Jennings took a privateering commission from Bennett to hunt Charles Vane.

A year later, shortly after news of the War of the Quadruple Alliance arrived in New Providence, pirates from the Bahamas surrendered to Bennett in April 1719 and received the king's pardon. That May, more pirates surrendered on condition that they be allowed to keep their plunder. Bennett reported that the pardon was working, since he was now only aware of ongoing piracy by Christopher Condent and Edward England.

=== Blackbeard ===
Map of North Carolina, showing the locations of Charles Town, Beaufort and Bath

Blackbeard heard of the proclamation around 5 December 1717, from the captain of a sloop which he had attacked. Around early May 1718, on New Providence, about 300 of his roughly 700 men left his company, some intending to take the King's Pardon. During his blockade of Charles Town around the end of that month, Blackbeard rejected a pardon from Governor Robert Johnson.

Around early June, near Beaufort, North Carolina, Blackbeard allowed Stede Bonnet to sail to Bath, North Carolina, to be pardoned by Governor Charles Eden. With Bonnet away, Blackbeard and about 100 others took the entire company's plunder – including Bonnet's share – and sailed to Bath along a different route, where they too received the King's Pardon.

Blackbeard and Bonnet would each return to piracy, Blackbeard using the veneer of legality afforded to him by Eden and his pardon, and Bonnet attempting to conceal his identity. Bonnet would later be executed, and Blackbeard would be killed while fighting Virginia authorities. Quartermaster William Howard, already convicted and sentenced, was pardoned after he was made aware that the deadline for surrendering had been extended, while Israel Hands (who had also been convicted) was pardoned, apparently for testifying against corrupt North Carolina officials.

=== South Carolina ===
In June 1718, about two weeks after Blackbeard's blockade of Charles Town, Governor Johnson opined that the proclamation of pardon was ineffective due to the number of recipients who returned to piracy, believing that the proclamation had proved to be an encouragement to pirates, and that the number of pirates had tripled since its publication.

During Charles Vane's blockade of Charles Town around 30 August 1718, Charles Yeats defected from Vane's command and, with a cargo of Guinean slaves, surrendered to Governor Johnson in exchange for a pardon.

=== Jamaica ===
From February to March 1718, Commander in Chief of Jamaica Peter Heywood reported that a considerable number of pirates had surrendered, including Hornigold. However, that August, the council and assembly reported that the pirates were numerous in spite of the proclamation. Governor Nicholas Lawes' commission to pardon arrived by the following October.

When the proclamation of 1718 was read and news of the War of the Quadruple Alliance arrived in March 1719, Governor Lawes wrote of his expectation that more pirates would surrender, the pirates having "long wish[ed] for" such a war. He also remarked that more pirates would have surrendered beforehand had they not been supplied with necessities and information from people on shore. The following month, Lawes discussed how the proclamation was ambiguous regarding whether pirates who could not return stolen property to its lawful owner should be imprisoned, explaining that a prosecution against Henry Jennings which had highlighted this ambiguity had also dissuaded pirates from surrendering.

Henry Jennings and Leigh Ashworth became privateers based in Jamaica. Ashworth resumed his piracy in May 1719.

=== Elsewhere ===
Governors Robert Hunter (of New York) and Samuel Shute (of Massachusetts and New Hampshire) each wrote of the proclamation's ineffectiveness in June 1718. In Virginia, due to fears that former pirates would return to piracy, a proclamation was issued that July to restrict their carrying arms or assembling in large numbers.

Commissions to pardon pirates arrived in New England by that September, in Barbados by October, in the Leeward Islands by November, in Virginia by December 1718, and in Nova Scotia by March 1719.

In December 1718, Secretary of State James Craggs warned governors against illegally receiving bribes in exchange for accepting pirates' surrender.

As the Caribbean became less hospitable to pirates, Africa became the destination of Olivier Levasseur, Edward England and Paulsgrave Williams.

== See also ==
- Amnesty
- Indemnity Act 1717
- Piracy Act 1717
- Piracy Act 1721
- Category:Pardoned pirates
- Operation Paperclip

== Bibliography ==
- Calendar of State Papers, Colonial series, America and West Indies, Jan. 1716–July 1717. London: HM Stationery Office. 1930.
- Calendar of State Papers, Colonial series. America and West Indies, August 1717–Dec. 1718. Vaduz: Kraus Reprint. 1964.
- Calendar of State Papers, Colonial series, America and West Indies, January, 1719–February, 1720. London: HM Stationery Office. 1933.
- Brigham, Clarence (1911). British Royal Proclamations Relating to America 1603–1783. Worcester, Massachusetts: American Antiquarian Society.
- Earle, Peter (2005). The Pirate Wars. New York: Thomas Dunne Books. ISBN 9780312335793.
- Grey, Charles (1933). Pirates of the Eastern Seas (1618-1723) A Lurid page of History. London: Sampson Low, Marston & Co., Ltd.
- Johnson, Charles (1724). A General History of the Pyrates (2 ed.). London: T. Warner.
- Johnson, Charles (1726). A General History of the Pyrates, vol. 2 (4 ed.). London: T. Woodward.
- Rogozinski, Jan (1999). Dictionary of Pirates. Ware, Hertfordshire: Wordsworth Editions Ltd. ISBN 1-85326-384-2.
- Senior, Clive M. (1976). A Nation of Pirates. Newton Abbot: David & Charles. ISBN 0-7153-7264-5.
- Woodard, Colin (2007). The Republic of Pirates. Harcourt, Inc. ISBN 978-0-15-101302-9.
- Woodard, Colin (2014). The Republic of Pirates. Pan Macmillan. ISBN 978-1-44-724608-4.
