= Daniel Stillwell =

Daniel Stillwell (active 1715–1718, last name also Stilwell) was a minor pirate in the Caribbean, best known for his association with Benjamin Hornigold.

== History ==
Formerly of Jamaica, Stillwell married the daughter of retired pirate Jonathan Darvill before settling on Eleuthera. Borrowing Darvill’s shallop, he and a small crew (including Darvill’s son) captured a Spanish ship off of Cuba which carried over 11,000 pieces of eight around 1714. Deputy Governor Thomas Walker of Nassau heard about the attack and as Spain and England had recently concluded a peace treaty, had Stillwell and his crew seized. Lacking authority to try Stillwell locally, he had Stillwell sent to Jamaica for trial. Hornigold had been using Darvill’s sloop Happy Return for his own piracy (and some sources indicate Hornigold had been with Stillwell off of Cuba), and had declared that all the Bahamas pirates were under his protection. He intercepted the ship carrying Stillwell and freed him, returning to Nassau to threaten Walker for interfering.

Stillwell later sailed as a crewmember aboard Hornigold’s ship. When King George offered a general pardon to all pirates who surrendered before September 1718, Stillwell accepted. He later became a ship owner, purchasing several vessels that operated out of the islands, including his father-in-law Jonathan Darvill’s old Happy Return.

== See also ==
- Admiralty court - the venue which would have tried Stillwell on Jamaica, and whose authority Walker lacked.
