= Benjamin Hornigold =

English pirate (1680–1719)

- Born: c. 1680; England
- Died: 1719 (aged 38–39); Somewhere between the Bahamas and New Spain
- Piratical career
- Type: Pirate; Pirate hunter
- Allegiance: Republic of Pirates (1715–1718); British Bahamas (1718–19)
- Years active: 1713–1718
- Rank: Captain
- Base of operations: West Indies
- Commands: Ranger (30-gun sloop); La Concorde (20-gun cargo ship)

Benjamin Hornigold (c. 1680–1719) was an English pirate towards the end of the Golden Age of Piracy.

Born in England in the late 17th century, Hornigold began his pirate career in 1713, attacking merchant ships in the Bahamas. He helped establish the "Republic of Pirates" in Nassau and by 1717 was the captain of one of the most heavily armed ships in the region, called the Ranger. It was at this time he appointed Edward Teach, best known in history books as "Blackbeard", as his second-in-command. Mindful not to attack British-led ships during his career, his crew eventually grew tired of the tactic and Hornigold was voted out as captain. In December 1718, Hornigold accepted a King's Pardon for his crimes and became a pirate hunter, pursuing his former allies on behalf of the Governor of the Bahamas, Woodes Rogers. He was killed when his ship was wrecked on a reef near New Spain during the hurricane season of 1719.

== Early career ==
Hornigold's early life is unrecorded, although sometimes people claim he was born in the English county of Norfolk, where the surname Hornigold or Hornagold appears. If so, he might have first served at sea aboard ships whose home port was either King's Lynn or Great Yarmouth. His first documented acts of piracy took place in the winter of 1713, when he employed periaguas (sailing canoes) and the sloop Happy Return, alongside Daniel Stillwell, John Cockram, and John West to menace merchant vessels off the coast of New Providence and its capital Nassau, where he had established a privateers' or pirates' republic. Hornigold himself sailed a ship named the Marianne. After a mutiny in the summer of 1716, he and his supporters were left with a captured sloop. By 1717, Hornigold had at his command a thirty-gun sloop he named the Ranger, which was probably the most heavily armed ship in the region, and this allowed him to seize other vessels with impunity.

Hornigold's second-in-command during this period was Edward Teach, who would later be better known as the pirate Blackbeard. When Hornigold took command of the Ranger, he delegated the captaincy of his earlier sloop to Teach. In the spring of 1717 the two pirate captains seized three merchant ships in quick succession, a Spanish one carrying 120 barrels of flour bound for Havana, another a Bermudian sloop with a cargo of spirits and the third a Portuguese ship travelling from Madeira with a cargo of white wine.

In March 1717, Hornigold attacked an armed merchant vessel sent to the Bahamas by the Governor of South Carolina to hunt for pirates. The merchantman escaped by running itself aground on Cat Cay, and its captain later reported that Hornigold's fleet had increased to five vessels, with a combined crew of around 350 pirates. In April 1717 Hornigold is recorded as operating alongside Captain Napin (or Napping), looting several ships off Jamaica, Puerto Bello, and Cuba before being chased away by the warship HMS Winchelsea. Hornigold had earlier forced aboard a surgeon named John Howell but released him on Nassau; when French pirate Jean Bonadvis tried to force Howell aboard his ship later in April 1717, Hornigold accepted Howell back aboard to protect him. After parting ways with Napin in June or July, they sailed together sporadically until October 1717.

Hornigold is recorded as having attacked a sloop off the coast of Honduras; one of the passengers of the captured vessel recounted, "they did us no further injury than the taking most of our hats from us, having got drunk the night before, as they told us, and toss'd theirs overboard". In September 1717, Hornigold and Teach met Major Stede Bonnet and his ship Revenge. Bonnet, having been wounded in battle, ceded his command to Teach. In October, another sloop was added to the fleet.

== Overthrow and pardon ==
Despite his apparent maritime supremacy, Hornigold remained careful not to attack British-flagged ships, apparently to maintain the legal defence that he was a privateer operating against England's enemies in the War of the Spanish Succession. This scrupulous approach was not to the liking of his lieutenants, and in the summer of 1716 a vote was taken among the combined crews to attack any vessel they chose. Hornigold opposed the decision and was replaced as captain of Marianne by Samuel Bellamy, whose friend Paulsgrave Williams was elected quartermaster. Hornigold and his supporters were left with a captured sloop which was commanded by Teach after Hornigold acquired the Ranger. He continued piracy operations from Nassau until December 1717, when word arrived of a general pardon for pirates offered by the King. Hornigold sailed to Jamaica with the Ranger and one of the other sloops in January 1718 and received a pardon from the governor there. He later became a pirate hunter for the new governor of the Bahamas, Woodes Rogers.

=== The King's Pardon of 1717 and 1718 ===
On 5 September 1717, King George I Issued the Proclamation of 1717 "For Suppressing Pirates in the West Indies". This document granted a pardon to all pirates who surrendered themselves to any colonial governor or governor under the domain of the British Empire safe passage and were guaranteed a "clean slate" of their record. However, word of this did not get out to the West Indies and so in December 1718 another proclamation, or more famously known as the King's Pardon of 1718, was issued for the same purpose. In both of these documents, not only were pirates granted a clean slate on their record, but they were also offered a large sum of money for the capturing of other pirates who were guilty of piracy, murder, and treason against His Majesty. More specifically, for every captain who was captured, the person responsible would receive £100, equivalent to £19,000 in 2025, and for every lieutenant and boatswain a reward of £40 (£7,600) was offered. Each level of member on a pirate ship had a reward placed on their heads from this point on.

== Pirate hunter and death ==
Rogers commissioned Hornigold to hunt down any and all recusant pirates, including some ex-comrades such as his former lieutenant, Teach (Blackbeard). He stalked but could not apprehend Charles Vane, capturing Vane's associate Nicholas Woodall instead, followed by John Auger, both of whom had accepted the same pardon as Hornigold, but later slid back into piracy. In December 1718 Governor Rogers wrote to the Board of Trade in London commending Hornigold's efforts to remedy his reputation as a pirate by hunting his former allies.

At some point in late 1719, Governor Rogers commissioned Captain Hornigold and a few other of Rogers' most trusted captains to help safeguard and facilitate the trade of valuable wares with the Spanish. During the voyage, Hornigold's ship was caught in a hurricane somewhere between New Providence and New Spain, and was wrecked on an uncharted reef. The incident is referred to in the contemporary account A General History of the Pyrates by Captain Charles Johnson, which states, "in one of which voyages ... Captain Hornigold, another of the famous pirates, was cast away upon rocks, a great way from land, and perished, but five of his men got into a canoe and were saved." The specific location of the reef remains unknown.

== Popular culture ==
Hornigold's flag from Black Sails

- Hornigold is in the 2006 television miniseries Blackbeard. He is portrayed by Stacy Keach.
- Hornigold appears as a non-player character and antagonist in the 2013 video game Assassin's Creed IV: Black Flag. He is voiced by Ed Stoppard.
- Hornigold is a supporting character in the Starz series Black Sails. He is portrayed by actor Patrick Lyster.
- Hornigold is portrayed by Sam Callis in the 2021 Netflix original series The Lost Pirate Kingdom.
- Hornigold appears in season 2 of Our Flag Means Death. He is played by Mark Mitchinson.
- Hornigold also appears in the game "Windrose" as a non-playable character.

== See also ==
- Richard Noland, who had sailed with Hornigold early in his career, later accompanied Samuel Bellamy after Hornigold was voted out as Captain, and was eventually employed as Hornigold's agent and recruiter on Nassau.

== Bibliography ==
- Earle, Peter (2003). The Pirate Wars. Methuen Publishing. p. 304. ISBN 0-413-75880-X.
- Konstam, Angus (2006). Blackbeard: America's Most Notorious Pirate. John Wiley & Sons. p. 336. ISBN 0-471-75885-X.
- Woodard, Colin (2007), The Republic of Pirates: Being the True and Surprising Story of the Caribbean Pirates and the Man Who Brought Them Down, Harcourt, Inc, ISBN 978-0-15-101302-9
