= HMS Phoenix (1694) =

Fireship of the English Royal Navy

England
- Name: HMS Phoenix
- Ordered: 16 November 1693
- Builder: John Gardner & John Dalton, Rotherhithe
- Launched: 16 March 1694
- Commissioned: 1694
- Reclassified: 24-gun sixth rate in 1711; 20-gun sixth rate in 1727
- Fate: Hulked in 1742; sold 1744

General characteristics
- Type: 8-gun Fireship
- Tons burthen: 256 83/94 bm
- Length: 91 ft 0 in (27.7 m) gundeck; 76 ft 0 in (23.2 m) keel for tonnage
- Beam: 25 ft 2.5 in (7.7 m) for tonnage
- Depth of hold: 9 ft 10.5 in (3.0 m)
- Sail plan: ship-rigged
- Complement: 45
- Armament: 8 × 6-pdr guns on wooden trucks

General characteristics as rebuilt 1708/09
- Type: 8-gun Fireship; 24-gun sixth rate in 1711
- Tons burthen: 273 21/94 bm
- Length: 93 ft 6 in (28.5 m) gundeck; 76 ft 9 in (23.4 m) keel for tonnage
- Beam: 25 ft 10 in (7.9 m) for tonnage
- Depth of hold: 9 ft 8 in (2.9 m)
- Sail plan: ship-rigged
- Complement: 45
- Armament: as built; 8 × 6-pdr guns on wooden trucks; conversion to sixth rate 1711; 20 6-pdr guns on wooden trucks (UD); 4 × 4-pdr guns on wooden trucks (QD)

General characteristics as rebuilt 1727
- Type: 20-gun Sixth Rate
- Tons burthen: 375 5/94 bm
- Length: 106 ft 0 in (32.3 m) gundeck; 87 ft 10 in (26.8 m) keel for tonnage
- Beam: 28 ft 4 in (8.6 m) for tonnage
- Depth of hold: 9 ft 2 in (2.8 m)
- Sail plan: ship-rigged
- Armament: 20 × 6-pdr 19 cwt guns on wooden trucks (UD)

HMS Phoenix was built as a fireship as part of the 1693–94 programme of Fireships. After her commissioning she spent time in the English Channel then joined the Fleet for the Battle of Vigo Bay followed by the Battle of Velez-Malaga. She went aground in the Isles of Scilly and was salvaged. While laid up at Plymouth in 1708 was rebuilt as a 24-gun sixth rate. After recommissioning she spent her time in Home Waters, North America and the West Indies. She was rebuilt again in 1727 before finally being sold in 1744.

Phoenix was the seventh named ship since it was used for a 20-gun ship purchased in 1546, rebuilt in 1558 and sold in 1573.

== Construction ==
She was ordered as a fireship on 16 November 1693 to be built under contract by John Gardner & John Dalton of Rotherhithe. She was launched on 16 March 1694.

== Commissioned service ==
She was commissioned in 1694 under the command of Captain Edward Rigby, RN. In December 1694 she was under the command of Captain John Douglas, RN for service in the English Channel. On 1 October 1697 she was under command of Captain Hercules Mitchell followed in 1701 Captain Joseph Soanes, RN. Captain John Mitchell, RN was in command for the Battle of Vigo Bay on 12 October 1702.In 1703 Commander John Trotter, RN. At the Battle of Velez-Malaga on 13 August 1704 she was under the command of Commander Edmund Hicks, RN as part of the cester squadron. On 9 March 1705 Captain Michael Sansom, RN took command for service in the Mediterranean. In 1707, she belonged to Admiral Sir Cloudesley Shovell's fleet. She saw action during the unsuccessful Battle of Toulon and was present during the great naval disaster off the Isles of Scilly when Shovell and four of his ships (Association, Firebrand, Romney and Eagle) were lost, claiming the lives of nearly 2,000 sailors. Phoenix ran ashore between Tresco and St Martin's and had to be beached, but could be kept seaworthy and finally managed to reach Portsmouth. She was salved and laid up at Plymouth during 1708/09. On 12 March 1708 she was ordered to be rebuilt as a 24-gun sixth rate.

== Rebuild as a 24-gun Sixth Rate 1708/09 Plymouth ==
She was taken in hand by Joseph Bingham of Plymouth for the rebuilding process. She would be rebuilt to dimensions similar to the Maidstone Group. She was launched on 28 May 1709. The dimensions after rebuild were gundeck 93 feet 6 inches (28.5 metres) with a keel length of 76 feet 9 inches (23.4 metres) for tonnage calculation. The breadth would be 25 feet 10.5 inches (7.9 metres) with a depth of hold of 9 ft 8 in (2.9 m). The tonnage calculation would be 27321/94 tons. As she would be completed and commissioned as a fireship, her gun armament was only eight 6-pounder 19 hundredweight (cwt) guns on wooden trucks, When she was upgraded to a 24-gun sixth rate in 1711 her gun armament was increased to twenty 6-pounder 19 hundredweight (cwt) guns mounted on wooden trucks and four 4-pounder 12 cwt guns on wooden trucks on the quarterdeck (QD).

== Commissioned service after 1708/09 rebuild ==
She commissioned in April 1709 as an 8-gun fireship under the command of Commander Thomas Graves, RN. She was damaged in a collision with HMS St Albans on 10 September 1709. She was paid off at Portsmouth on 28 September 1709. She was recommissioned in 1710 under Commander Edward Blacket, RN (promoted to captain in January 1713) for service in the English Channel and North Sea. She underwent a considerable repair at Woolwich between March and May 1713. She went to New England in 1714/15. On 5 October she came under command of Captain Vincent Pearce, RN for service on the coast of Scotland. She was with Admiral Byng's Fleet in the Baltic in 1717. In February 1718 she sailed to the Republic of Pirates in Nassau to help those intending to take the king's pardon for pirates who were willing to surrender and abandon piracy. After the Bahamas, she proceeded to New York. She returned to Home Waters in 1721. She was surveyed at Deptford in 1727. She was dismantled and her timbers were moved to Woolwich to begin the rebuilding process.

== Rebuild at Woolwich 1727 ==
She was ordered rebuilt at Woolwich on 23 March 1727 under the guidance of John Hayward, Master Shipwright of Woolwich. Her keel was laid in April 1727 and launched on 16 January 1728. The dimensions after rebuild were gundeck 106 feet 0 inches (32.3 metres) with a keel length of 87 feet 10 inches (26.8 metres) for tonnage calculation. The breadth would be 28 feet 4 inches (8.6 metres) with a depth of hold of 9 ft 2 in (2.8 m). The tonnage calculation would be 3755/94 tons. Her gun armament would be twenty 6-pounder 19 hundredweight (cwt) guns mounted on wooden trucks. She was completed on 12 March 1728 at a cost of £4,752.19.11d (Note: A total cost accounting for inflation of approximately £889,900 in today's money.) to build her hull only.

== Commissioned service after 1727 rebuild ==
She commissioned in 1727 under Captain Aurthur Jones, RN for service in Home Waters. Captain Jones died in January 1731 and the ship was paid off. In 1732 she was under Captain William Douglas, RN for service at Jamaica. She returned Home to pay off in 1734. She underwent a small repair at Woolwich from May to December 1735 costing £988.10.1d. (Note: A total cost accounting for inflation of approximately £185,000 in today's money.) Captain Charles Fanshaw, RN took over in 1737 for service in Carolina from 1738 to 1740 then she was in Georgia operations in June 1740.

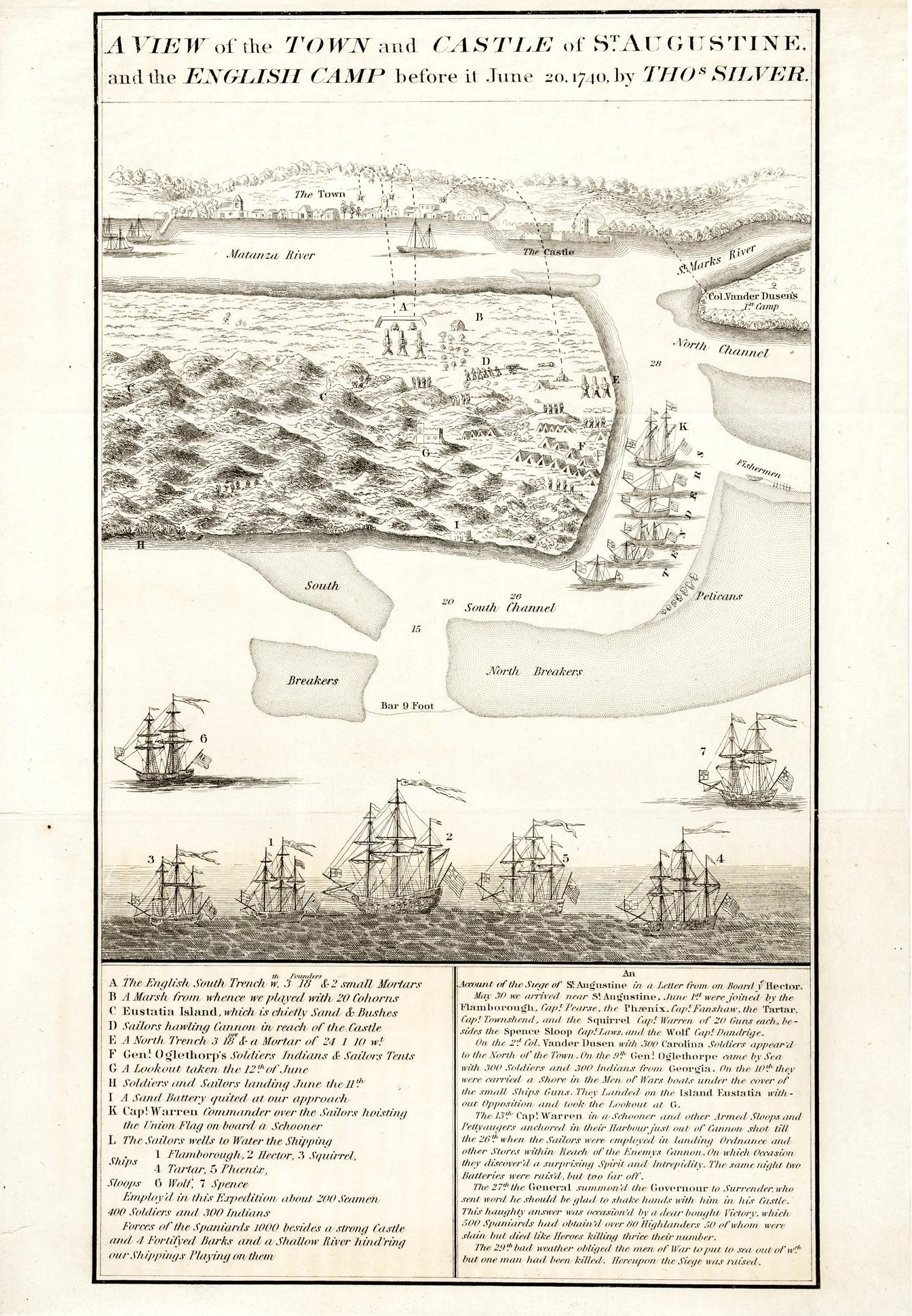
A View of the Town and Castle of St. Augustine, and the English Camp before it June 20, 1740, Phoenix shown. The Gentleman's Magazine, 1740

She played a minor role in the 1740 Siege of St. Augustine during the War of Jenkins' Ear. In 1741 she was involved in the defence of Charlestown, South Carolina, from Spanish pirates. She returned Home in April 1742.

== Disposition ==
She underwent a survey in May 1742 and was condemned. She was hulked at Woolwich in November 1742 by Admiralty Order (AO) 9 November 1742. She was sold at Woolwich by AO 16 June 1744 for £201 (Note: A total cost accounting for inflation of approximately £37,600 in today's money.) on 28 June 1744.
