= Woodes Rogers =

British sea captain and governor of the Bahamas

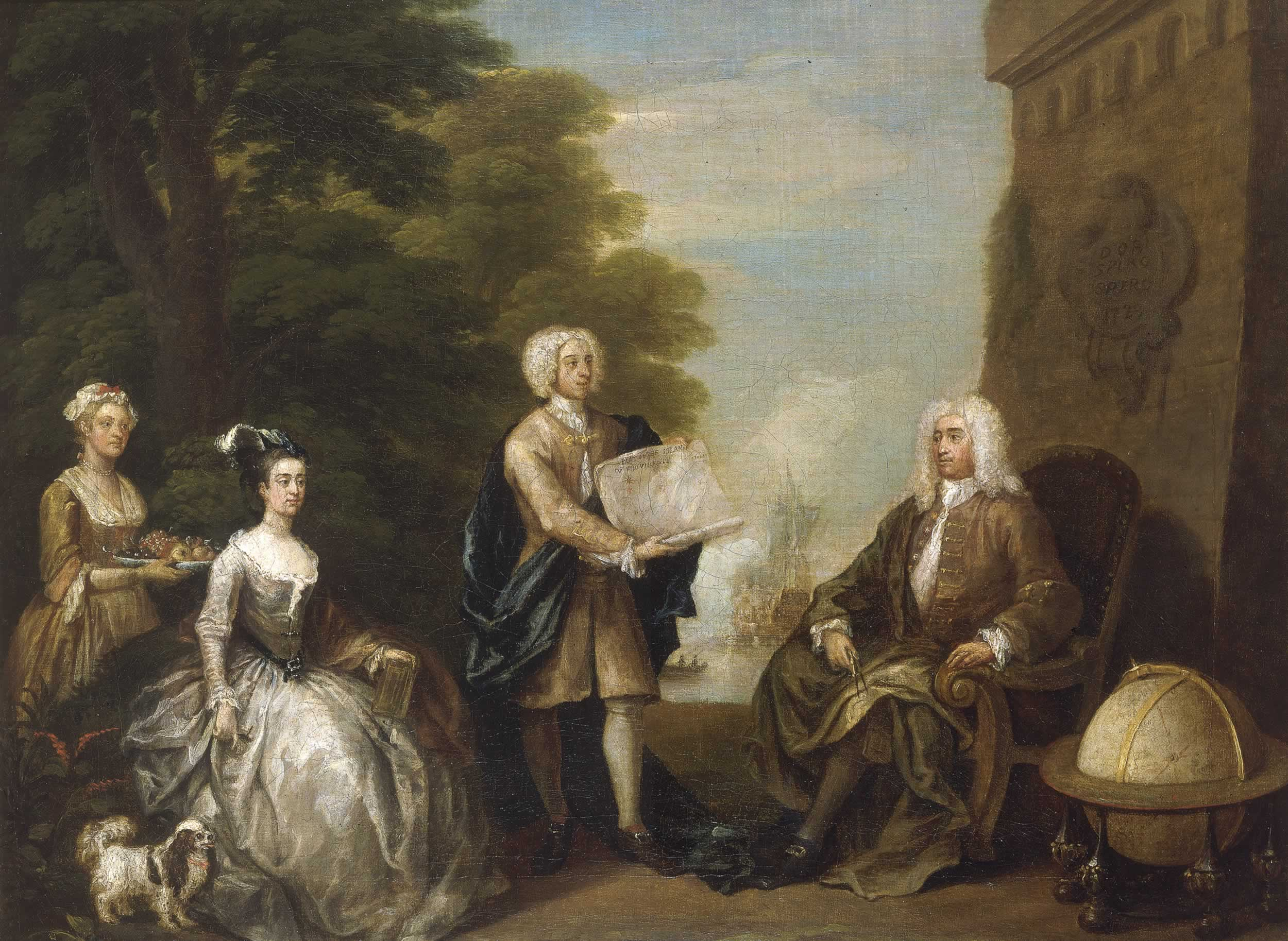
- Rogers (right) receives a map of New Providence Island from his son, in a 1729 painting

Governor of the Bahamas
- In office 6 January 1718 – June 1721
- Appointed by: George I
- Preceded by: New creation
- Succeeded by: George Phenney
- In office 22 October 1728 – 15 July 1732
- Appointed by: George II
- Preceded by: George Phenney
- Succeeded by: Richard Thompson (acting governor)

Personal details
- Born: c. 1679 England
- Died: 15 July 1732 (aged approximately 53) Nassau, Bahamas
- Resting place: Nassau, Bahamas
- Children: 3

Woodes Rogers (c. 1679 – 15 July 1732) was an English sea captain, privateer and colonial administrator who served as the governor of the Bahamas from 1718 to 1721 and again from 1728 to 1732. He is remembered as the captain of the vessel that rescued marooned Scottish sailor Alexander Selkirk, whose plight is generally believed to have inspired Daniel Defoe's novel Robinson Crusoe. Rogers came from an experienced seafaring family, grew up in Poole and Bristol, and served a marine apprenticeship to a Bristol sea captain. His father, who held shares in many ships, died when Rogers was in his mid-twenties, leaving Rogers in control of the family shipping business.

In 1707, Rogers was approached by Captain William Dampier, who sought support for a privateering voyage against the Spanish, with whom the British were at war. Rogers led the expedition, which consisted of two well-armed ships, Duke and Duchess, and was the captain of Duke. In three years, Rogers and his men went around the world, capturing several ships in the Pacific Ocean. En route, the expedition rescued Selkirk, finding him on Juan Fernández Island on 1 February 1709. When the expedition returned to England in October 1711, Rogers had circumnavigated the globe, while retaining his original ships and most of his men, and the investors in the expedition doubled their money.

The expedition made Rogers a national hero, but his brother was killed and Rogers was badly wounded in fights in the Pacific. On his return, he was sued by his crew on the grounds that they had not received their fair share of the expedition profits, and Rogers was forced into bankruptcy. He wrote of his maritime experiences in the book A Cruising Voyage Round the World, which sold well, in part due to public fascination at Selkirk's rescue. Rogers was twice appointed Governor of the Bahamas, where he succeeded in warding off threats from the Spanish, and in ridding the colony of pirates. His first term as governor was financially ruinous, and on his return to England, he was imprisoned for debt. During his second term as governor, Rogers died in Nassau, aged about 53.

== Early life ==
Woodes Rogers was the eldest son and heir of Woods Rogers, a successful merchant captain. Woodes Rogers spent part of his childhood in Poole, England, where he likely attended the local school; his father, who owned shares in many ships, was often away nine months of the year with the Newfoundland fishing fleet. Sometime between 1690 and 1696, Captain Rogers moved his family to Bristol. In November 1697, Woodes Rogers was apprenticed to Bristol mariner John Yeamans, to learn the profession of a sailor. At 18, Rogers was somewhat old to be starting a seven-year apprenticeship. His biographer, Brian Little, suggests that this might have been a way for the newcomers to become part of Bristol maritime society, as well as making it possible for Woodes Rogers to become a freeman, or voting citizen, of the city. Little also suggests that it is likely that Rogers gained his maritime experience with Yeamans's ship on the Newfoundland fleet.

Rogers completed his apprenticeship in November 1704. The following January, Rogers married Sarah Whetstone, daughter of Rear Admiral Sir William Whetstone. In 1706, the elder Captain Rogers died at sea, leaving his ships and business to his son Woodes. Between 1706 and the end of 1708, Woodes and Sarah Rogers had a son and two daughters.

== Privateering expedition ==
=== Preparation and early voyage ===
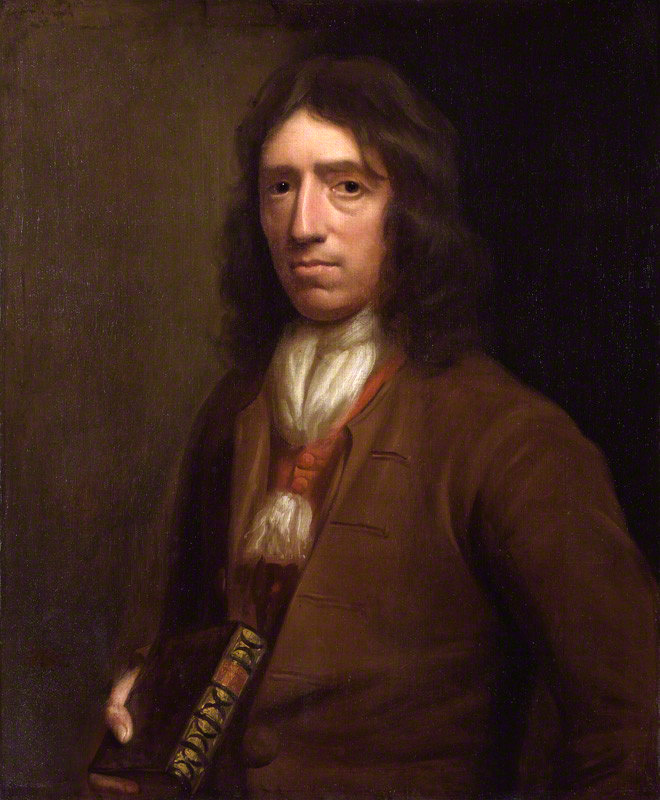
William Dampier

The War of the Spanish Succession started in 1702, during which England's main maritime foes were France and Spain, and a number of Bristol ships were given letters of marque, allowing them to strike against enemy shipping. At least four vessels in which Rogers had an ownership interest were granted the letters. One, Whetstone Galley, named for Rogers's father-in-law, received the letters before being sent to Africa to begin a voyage in the Atlantic slave trade (Rogers would continue to engage in slave trading for the rest of his life). The ship did not reach Africa, but was captured by the French. Rogers suffered other losses against the French, although he does not record their extent in his book. He turned to privateering as a means of recouping these losses.

In late 1707, Rogers was approached by William Dampier, a navigator and friend of Rogers's father, who proposed a privateering expedition against the Spanish. This was a desperate move on the part of Captain Dampier to save his career. Dampier had recently returned from leading a two-ship privateering expedition into the Pacific, which culminated in a series of mutinies before both ships finally sank due to Dampier's error in not having the hulls properly protected against worms before leaving port. Unaware of this, Rogers agreed. Financing was provided by many in the Bristol community, including Thomas Goldney II of the Quaker Goldney family and Thomas Dover, who would become president of the voyage council and Rogers's father in law. Commanding two frigates, Duke and Duchess, and captaining the first, Rogers spent three years circumnavigating the globe. The ships departed Bristol on 1 August 1708. Dampier was aboard as Rogers's sailing master.

Rogers encountered various problems along the way. Forty of the Bristol crew deserted or were dismissed, and he spent a month in Ireland recruiting replacements and having the vessels prepared for sea. Many crew members were Dutch, Danish, or other foreigners. Some of the crew mutinied after Rogers refused to let them plunder a neutral Swedish vessel. When the mutiny was put down, he had the leader flogged, put in irons, and sent to England aboard another ship. The less culpable mutineers were given lighter punishments, such as reduced rations. The ships intended to force the chilly Drake Passage off the tip of South America, but expedition leaders soon realised that they were short of warm clothing and alcohol, which was then believed to warm those exposed to cold. Considering the latter the more important problem, the expedition made a stop at Tenerife to stock up on the local wine, and later sewed the ships' blankets into cold weather gear. The ships experienced a difficult inter-oceanic passage; they were forced to almost 62° South latitude, which, according to Rogers, "for ought we know is the furthest that any one has yet been to the southward". At their furthest south, they were closer to as-yet-undiscovered Antarctica than to South America.

=== Rescue of Selkirk and raids on the Spanish ===
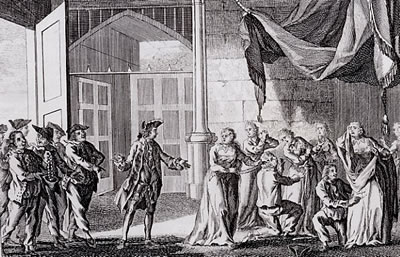
Rogers's men search Spanish ladies for their jewels in Guayaquil

Rogers stocked his ships with limes to fend off scurvy, a practice not universally accepted at that time. After the ships reached the Pacific Ocean, their provisions of limes were exhausted and seven men died of the vitamin deficiency disease. Dampier was able to guide the ships to little-known Juan Fernández Island to replenish supplies of fresh produce. On 1 February 1709, as they neared the island, the sailors spotted a fire ashore and feared that it might be a shore party from a Spanish vessel. The next morning Rogers sent a party ashore and discovered that the fire was from Scottish sailor Alexander Selkirk, who had been stranded there four years previously. Selkirk was to become an inspiration for the classic novel Robinson Crusoe, written by Rogers's friend, Daniel Defoe. Rogers found Selkirk to be "wild-looking" and "wearing goatskins", noting in his journal, "He had with him his clothes and bedding, with a firelock, some powder, bullets and tobacco, a hatchet, a knife, a kettle, a Bible and books." Selkirk, who had been part of the ship's crew that abandoned Dampier after losing confidence in his leadership, was now more than willing to join a flotilla that included his old commodore as ship's pilot. Selkirk served as a mate aboard the Duke, and was later given command of one of the prize ships taken by the expedition.

After leaving Juan Fernández on 14 February 1709, the expedition captured and looted a number of small vessels, and launched an attack on the town of Guayaquil, today located in Ecuador. When Rogers attempted to negotiate with the governor, the townsfolk secreted their valuables. Rogers was able to get a modest ransom for the town, but some crew members were so dissatisfied that they dug up the recently dead hoping to find items of value. This led to sickness on board ship, of which six men died. The expedition lost contact with one of the captured ships, which was under the command of Simon Hatley. The other vessels searched for Hatley's ship, but to no avail—Hatley and his men were captured by the Spanish. On a subsequent voyage to the Pacific, Hatley would emulate Selkirk by becoming the centre of an event which would be immortalised in literature. His ship beset by storms, Hatley shot an albatross in the hope of better winds, an episode memorialised by Samuel Taylor Coleridge.

The crew of the vessels became increasingly discontented, and Rogers and his officers feared another mutiny. This tension was dispelled by the expedition's capture of a rich prize off the coast of Mexico: the Spanish vessel Nuestra Señora de la Encarnación y Desengaño. Rogers sustained a wound to the face in the battle. While Duke and Duchess were successful in capturing that vessel, they failed to capture Encarnación's companion, a well-armed galleon, Nuestra Señora de Begoña, which made its escape after damaging both vessels. Rogers only reluctantly agreed to giving the inexperienced Captain Dover command of Encarnación, a decision that may have been eased by naming Selkirk as its sailing master. The privateers, accompanied by their two prizes, limped across the Pacific Ocean. The expedition was able to resupply at Guam, which, though governed by the Spanish, extended a cordial welcome to the privateers.

=== Homeward voyage ===
The ships then went to the Dutch port of Batavia in what is now Indonesia, where Rogers underwent surgery to remove a musket ball from the roof of his mouth, and the expedition disposed of the less seaworthy of the two Spanish prizes. Dealing with the Dutch there constituted a violation of the British East India Company's monopoly. When the ships finally dropped anchor in the River Thames on 14 October 1711, a legal battle ensued, with the investors paying the East India Company £6,000 (about £1,065,000 at today's values) as settlement for their claim for breach of monopoly, about four per cent of what Rogers brought back. The investors approximately doubled their money, while Rogers gained £1,600 (now worth perhaps £284,000) from a voyage which disfigured him and cost him his brother, who was killed in a battle in the Pacific. The money was probably less than he could have made at home, and was entirely absorbed by the debts his family had incurred in his absence. The long voyage and the capture of the Spanish ship made Rogers a national hero. Rogers was the first Englishman, in circumnavigating the globe, to have his original ships and most of his crew survive.

After his voyage, he wrote an account of it, titled A Cruising Voyage Round the World. Edward Cooke, an officer aboard Duchess, also wrote a book, A Voyage to the South Sea and Round the World, and beat Rogers to print by several months. Rogers's book was much more successful, with many readers fascinated by the account of Selkirk's rescue, which Cooke had slighted. Among those interested in Selkirk's adventure was Daniel Defoe, who appears to have read about it, and fictionalised the story as Robinson Crusoe.

While Rogers's book enjoyed financial success, it had a practical purpose—to aid British navigators and possible colonists. Much of Rogers's introduction is devoted to advocacy for the South Seas trade. Rogers notes that had there been a British colony in the South Seas, he would not have had to worry about food supplies for his crew. A third of Rogers's book is devoted to detailed descriptions of the places that he explored, with special emphasis on "such [places] as may be of most use for enlarging our trade". He describes the area of the River Plate in detail because it lay "within the limits of the South Sea Company", whose schemes had not yet burst into financial scandal. Rogers's book was carried by such South Pacific navigators as Admiral George Anson and privateering captains John Clipperton and George Shelvocke.

== Governor and later life ==
=== Financial difficulties and the Bahamas proposal ===
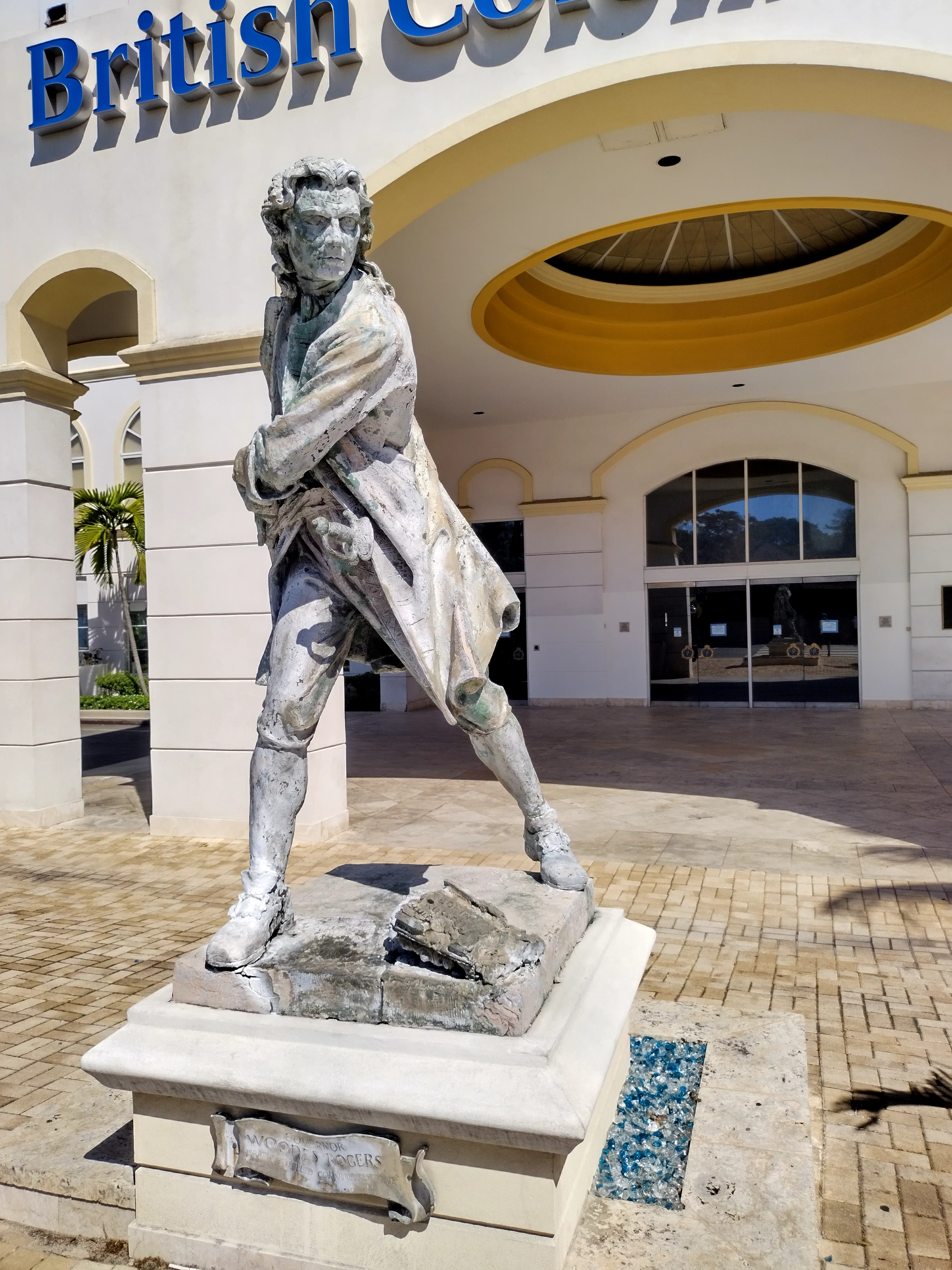
Statue of Woodes Rogers outside the British Colonial Hotel, Nassau

Rogers encountered financial problems on his return. Sir William Whetstone had died, and Rogers, having failed to recoup his business losses through privateering, was forced to sell his Bristol home to support his family. He was successfully sued by a group of over 200 of his crew, who stated that they had not received their fair share of the expedition profits. The profits from his book were not enough to overcome these setbacks, and he was forced into bankruptcy. His wife gave birth to their fourth child a year after his return—a boy who died in infancy—and Woodes and Sarah Rogers soon permanently separated.

Rogers decided the way out of his financial difficulty was to lead another expedition, this time against pirates. In 1713, Rogers led what was ostensibly an expedition to purchase slaves in Madagascar and take them to the Dutch East Indies, this time with the permission of the British East India Company. Rogers's secondary purpose was to gather details on the pirates of Madagascar, hoping to destroy or reform them, and colonise Madagascar on a future trip. Rogers collected information regarding pirates and their vessels near the island. Finding that a large number of the pirates had gone native, he persuaded many of them to sign a petition to Queen Anne asking her for clemency. While Rogers's expedition was profitable, when it returned to London in 1715, the British East India Company vetoed the idea of a colonial expedition to Madagascar, believing a colony was a greater threat to its monopoly than a few pirates. Accordingly, Rogers turned his sights from Madagascar to the West Indies. His connections included several of the advisers to the new king, George I, who had succeeded Queen Anne in 1714, and Rogers was able to forge an agreement for a company to manage the Bahamas, which were infested with pirates, in exchange for a share of the colony's profits.

At the time, according to the Governor of Bermuda, the Bahamas were "without any face or form of Government" and the colony was a "sink or nest of infamous rascals". Until Rogers obtained his commission, the islands had been nominally governed by absentee Lords Proprietor, who did little except appoint a new, powerless governor when the position fell vacant. Under the agreement that underlay Rogers's commission, the Lords Proprietor leased their rights for a token sum to Rogers's company for twenty-one years.

On 5 September 1717, a proclamation was issued announcing clemency for all piratical offences, provided that those seeking what became known as the "King's Pardon" surrendered not later than 5 September 1718. Colonial governors and deputy governors were authorised to grant the pardon. Rogers was officially appointed "Captain General and Governor in Chief" by George I on 6 January 1718. He did not leave immediately for his new bailiwick, but spent several months preparing the expedition, which included seven ships, 100 soldiers, 130 colonists, and supplies ranging from food for the expedition members and ships' crews to religious pamphlets to give to the pirates, whom Rogers believed would respond to spiritual teachings. On 22 April 1718, the expedition, accompanied by three Royal Navy vessels, sailed out of the Thames.

=== First term ===
The expedition arrived on 24 July 1718, surprising and trapping a ship commanded by pirate Charles Vane. After negotiations failed, Vane used a captured French vessel as a fireship in an attempt to ram the naval vessels. The attempt failed, but the naval vessels were forced out of the west end of Nassau harbour, giving Vane's crew an opportunity to raid the town and secure the best local pilot. Vane and his men then escaped in a small sloop via the harbour's narrow east entrance. The pirates had evaded the trap, but Nassau and New Providence Island were in Rogers's hands.

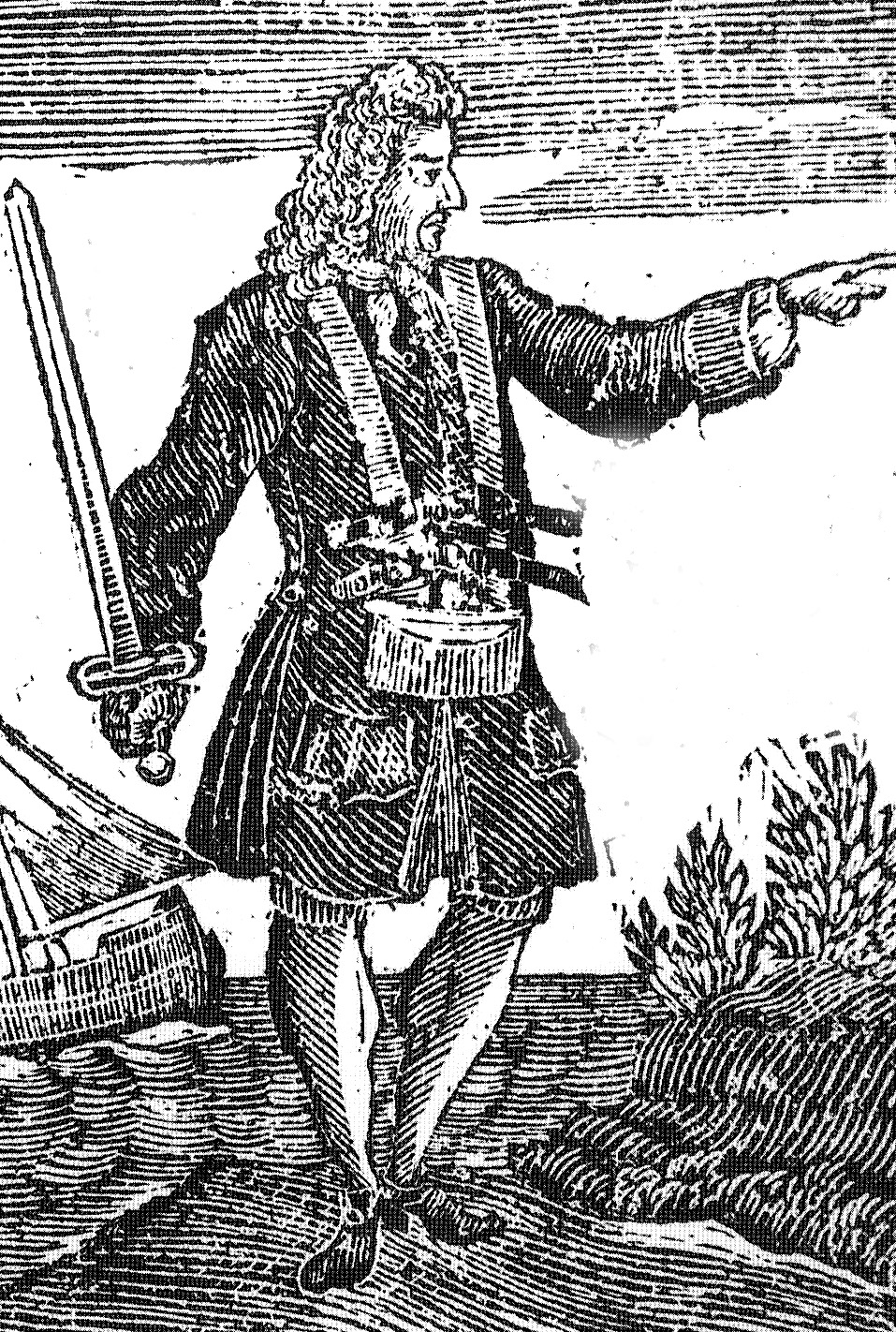
Charles Vane

At the time, the island's population consisted of about 200 former pirates and several hundred fugitives who had escaped from nearby Spanish colonies. Rogers organised a government, granted the King's Pardon to those former pirates on the island who had not yet accepted it, and started to rebuild the island's fortifications, which had fallen into decrepitude under pirate domination. Less than a month into his residence on New Providence, Rogers was faced with a double threat: Vane wrote, threatening to join with Edward Teach (better known as Blackbeard) to retake the island, and Rogers learned that the Spanish also planned to drive the British out of the Bahamas.

Rogers's expedition suffered further setbacks. An unidentified disease killed almost 100 of his expedition members, while leaving the long-term residents nearly untouched. Two of the three navy vessels, having no orders to remain, left for New York. Ships sent to Havana to conciliate the Spanish governor there never arrived, their crew revolting and becoming pirates mid-voyage. Finally, the third naval vessel left in mid-September, its commander promising to return in three weeks—a promise he had no intention of keeping. Work on rebuilding the island's fortifications proceeded slowly, with the locals showing a disinclination to work.

On 14 September 1718, Rogers received word that Vane was at Green Turtle Cay near Abaco, about 120 miles (190 km) north of Nassau. Some of the pardoned pirates on New Providence took boats to join Vane, and Rogers decided to send two ex-pirate captains, Benjamin Hornigold and John Cockram, with a crew to gather intelligence, and, if possible, to bring Vane to battle. As the weeks passed, and hopes of their return dimmed, Rogers declared martial law and set all inhabitants to work on rebuilding the island's fortifications. Finally, the former pirates returned. They had failed to find an opportunity to kill Vane or bring him to battle, but had captured one ship and a number of pirate captives. Captain Hornigold was then sent to recapture the ships and crews who had gone pirate en route to Havana. He returned with ten prisoners, including captain John Auger, and three corpses. On 9 December 1718, Rogers brought the ten men captured by Hornigold to trial. Nine were convicted, and Rogers had eight hanged three days later, reprieving the ninth on hearing he was of good family. One of the condemned, Thomas Morris, quipped as he climbed the gallows, "We have a good governor, but a harsh one." The executions so cowed the populace that when, shortly after Christmas, several residents plotted to overthrow Rogers and restore the island to piracy, the conspirators attracted little support. Rogers had them flogged, then released as harmless.

On 16 March 1719 Rogers learned that Spain and Britain were at war again. He redoubled his efforts to repair the island's fortifications, buying vital supplies on credit in the hope of later being reimbursed by the expedition's investors. The Spanish sent an assault fleet against Nassau in May, but when the fleet's commodore learned that the French (now Britain's ally) had captured Pensacola, he directed the fleet there instead. This gave Rogers time to continue to fortify and supply New Providence, and in February 1720 the Spaniards finally arrived in Nassau. Two ex-slave sentries alerted the town. The presence of two frigates, the 32-gun Delicia, and 24-gun HMS Flamborough under Captain Jonathan Hildesley, as well as 500 ready waiting militia, many of them ex-pirates, helped cause the Spanish withdrawal.

The year 1720 brought an end to external threats to Rogers's rule. With Spain and Britain at peace again, the Spanish made no further move against the Bahamas. Vane never returned, having been shipwrecked and captured in the Bay Islands—a year later, he was hanged in Jamaica. This did not end Rogers's problems as governor. Overextended from financing New Providence's defences, he received no assistance from Britain, and merchants refused to give him further credit. His health suffered, and he spent six weeks in Charleston, South Carolina, hoping to recuperate. Instead, he was wounded in a duel with Hildesley, caused by disputes between the two on New Providence. Troubled by the lack of support and communication from London, Rogers set sail for Britain in March 1721. He arrived three months later to find that a new governor had been appointed, and his company had been liquidated. Personally liable for the obligations he had contracted at Nassau, he was imprisoned for debt.

=== Activities in England, second term, and death ===
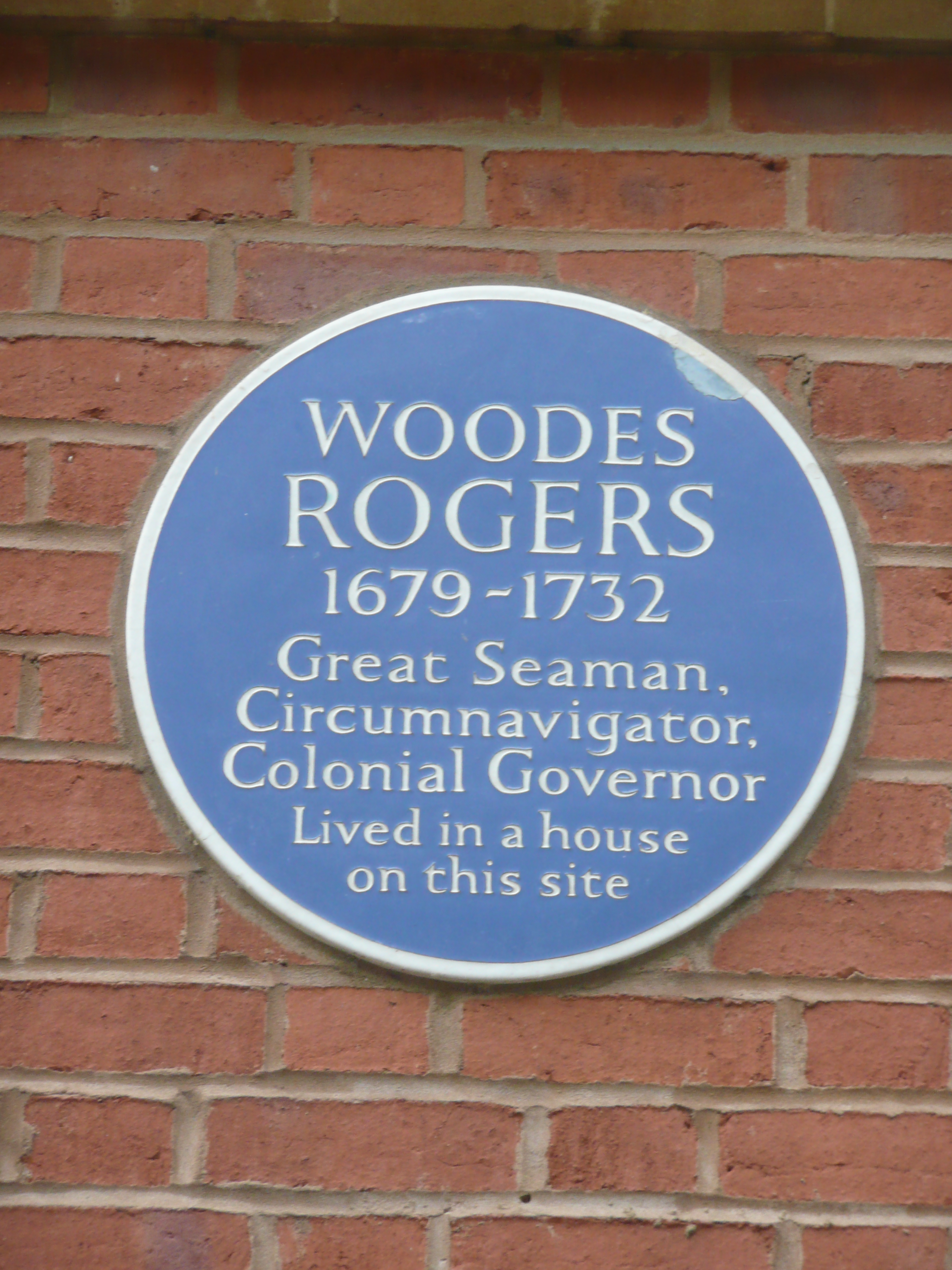
Plaque on the site of Rogers's Bristol residence, 35 Queen Square

With both the government and his former partners refusing to honour his debts, Rogers was released from debtor's prison only when his creditors took pity on him and absolved him of his debts. Even so, Rogers wrote that he was "perplexed with the melancholy prospect of [his] affairs". In 1722 or 1723, Rogers was approached by a man writing a history of piracy, and supplied him with information. The resulting work, A General History of the Robberies and Murders of the Most Notorious Pyrates, published under the pseudonym Captain Charles Johnson, was an enormous hit on both sides of the Atlantic, and catapulted Rogers for the second time to the status of a national hero. With public attention focused on him again, Rogers was successful in 1726 in petitioning the king for financial redress. King George I granted him a pension, retroactive to 1721, and the king's son and successor, George II, reappointed him as governor on 22 October 1728.

The Bahamas did not come under external threat during Rogers's second term, but the reappointed governor had difficulties. Still seeking to bolster the island's defences, Rogers sought imposition of a local tax. The assembly, which had been instituted in Rogers's absence, objected, and Rogers responded by dissolving it. The governmental battle exhausted Rogers, who again went to Charleston in early 1731 in an attempt to recover his health. Though he returned in July 1731, he never truly regained his health, and died in Nassau on 15 July 1732.

A harbour-side street in Nassau is named for Rogers. "Piracy expelled, commerce restored" remained the motto of the Bahamas until the islands gained independence in 1973.
