= Jonathan Barnet =

English privateer

- Born: 1677; England
- Died: 1744 (aged 66–67); Montego Bay, Jamaica
- Occupations: Privateer, merchant, slaveholder
- Years active: 1712–1720
- Era: Golden Age of Piracy
- Known for: Capturing pirates John Rackham, Anne Bonny, and Mary Read
- Piratical career
- Base of operations: Colony of Jamaica
- Commands: Tyger

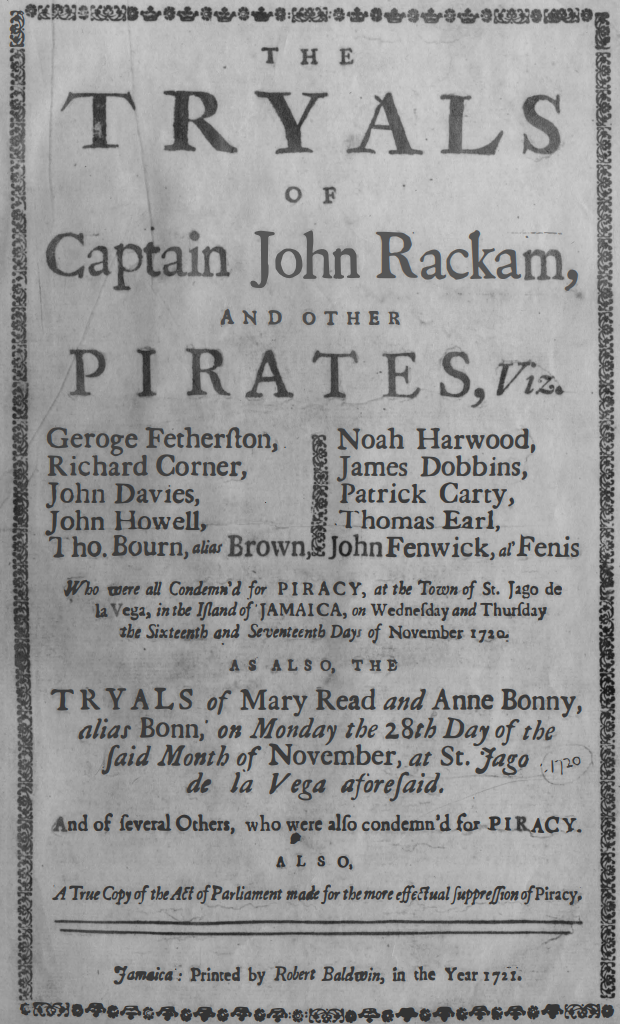
Cover page from the transcript of Rackham, Read, and Bonny's 1720 trial

Jonathan Barnet (1677/78 – 1744) was an English privateer in the Caribbean, best known for capturing pirates John Rackham, Anne Bonny, and Mary Read. The Assembly of the Colony of Jamaica gave him a financial reward and a large estate in the parish of St James, where enslaved Africans worked.

== Privateer ==
Barnet's privateering career began as early as 1712, during the War of Spanish Succession. English merchant Nathaniel Uring recorded a "Capt Barnet" around Jamaica in July of 1712, fighting Spanish vessels.

Lord Archibald Hamilton, Governor of Jamaica, commissioned ten privateers in late 1715 and charged them with hunting pirates. Among them was Barnet, who sailed out in a 90-ton snow called Tyger. (Note: Barnet's ship early in his cateer is often referred to as the "Snow Tiger" or "Snow-tyger". In reality the ship's name was simply Tyger; a "snow" was a name for a particular type of two-masted ship, similar to a brig.)

The Tyger's owners and Barnet posted bond before he sailed. Barnet's six-month commission was periodically renewed by Hamilton and succeeding Governors. Hamilton gave Barnet specific instructions on which flag to fly, on keeping a journal, and where to bring captured prize ships for confirmation, as well as a warning: "You are not on any pretence to committ any acts of hostility, on any of H.M. allies, neuters, friends or subjects."

Barnet immediately joined the other privateers in raiding the wrecks of the 1715 Spanish Treasure Fleet. Jamaican Deputy Secretary Samuel Page initially blamed Barnet's actions on the sloop Barsheba captained by Henry Jennings, spurring a Spanish emissary to make an angry visit to Jamaica demanding action against the privateers. The Tyger's owners included Daniel Axtell, who also held shares of the privateer (and later pirate) vessels commanded by Leigh Ashworth, James Carnegie, and Samuel Liddell, all of which looted the Spanish wrecks as well. After Barnet's raids came to light, Page was removed from office for consorting with pirates. Governor Hamilton himself was also recalled to England, replaced by Peter Heywood.

Governor Heywood would later fume against the rogue privateers who antagonized the Spanish under the flimsy pretense of privateering, remarking, "had not Comissions [sic] been granted which were given out on pretext of suppressing pyracys, these unhappy disorders had not been committed: and what was said to Jonathan Barnet (as will appear from his deposition) was too great an encouragement to be given to those sort of people."

== Capture of Rackham ==
In 1716, Barnet testified against embattled Jamaican Governor Lord Archibald Hamilton, who was removed from office for consorting with pirates. Barnet may have taken a 1717 pardon offered to all pirates who surrendered within a year: by 1720 his commission had been renewed yet again, this time by Heywood's replacement Governor Nicholas Lawes. Barnet sailed late that year on a trading voyage alongside Jean Bonadvis, another former pirate and privateer turned pirate-hunter. Bonadvis spotted a sloop nearby and approached, only to be fired on. He retreated and reported the aggressor's location to Barnet, who left in pursuit. Barnet hailed the vessel, whose drunken crew refused to surrender, and captured it after a brief fight.

The vessel turned out to be the William, captained by John Rackham, who had aboard two female pirates, Mary Read and Anne Bonny. The pirates were quickly tried and hanged, though the women managed to avoid execution by claiming to be pregnant. Lawes congratulated Barnet: "About a fortnight ago a trading sloop belonging to the Island, being well manned and commanded by a brisk fellow one Jonathan Barnet, did us a very good piece [sic] of service. He was met by a pirate vessel at the Leward part of this Island commanded by one Rackum in which were 18 pirates more, whom he took and are now in gaol..."

== Planter and slaveholder ==
The Assembly of Jamaica gave him a substantial estate in Jamaica as his reward, and he was later elected one of the two elected representatives for Saint James Parish, Jamaica. His estate embodied the fledgling port of Montego Bay, and one of the main streets in the city is named after him to this day. Barnet died in March 1744, and William Barrett replaced him in the Assembly. At his death, Barnet enslaved 144 Africans, 81 men and 63 women. Of that number, 26 were children. Barnet's estate was valued at nearly £7,000, of which the majority was the valuation of his enslaved labour force.

However, Barnet had no legitimate white offspring to inherit his estates, so in 1739, Barnet submitted a bill to the Assembly to have his mistress, Jane Stone, "a free mulatto woman", and her four children, Thomas Hugh Barnet Stone, Elizabeth, another Jane Stone, and Ann Stone, entitled to "the same rights and privileges with English subjects, born to white parents". They were declared white by the Assembly, and Hugh Barnet went on to inherit his father's estates and enslaved Africans. In 1779, Hugh Barnet died, and Barnet's estate passed to his son, Hugh Barnet.

== See also ==
- Nicholas Brown, Robert Deal and Captain Thompson – three other pirates captured by Lawes' pirate-hunters
- Turn Joe – an Irish pirate who sailed in Spanish service and was caught by Jean Bonadvis
