= Francis Fernando =

- Occupation: Pirate
- Years active: 1715-1716
- Piratical career
- Base of operations: Caribbean
- Commands: Bennett

Francis Fernando (fl. 1715–1716) was a Jamaican pirate and privateer active in the Caribbean. He was one of the few confirmed mixed-race Captains in the Golden Age of Piracy.

== History ==
Francis Fernando, described as “a mulatto commander” and “a tawny Moor,” owned an estate in Jamaica and was prosperous enough to post a security deposit for his voyages. He was granted a privateering commission in late 1715 from Lord Archibald Hamilton, Governor of Jamaica. He also sold Hamilton a share of ownership in his sloop Bennett, which meant Hamilton would personally profit from any prize ships Fernando took.

In early 1716, he captured the Spanish sloop Nuestra Señora de Belen. His commission had been to sail against pirates; he justified taking the Spanish ship on the grounds that it had originally been an English vessel (the Kingston or Kensington), unlawfully captured by the Spanish. He returned to Jamaica to have the prize confirmed, though he only left the bulk cargo aboard - he had removed all the jewels, coins, and other valuables, worth 250,000 pieces of eight. Shrewdly, Fernando kept the Bennett offshore while awaiting the prize court’s judgment.

He captured another Spanish ship shortly afterwards, this time sailing to New Providence in the Bahamas to share out the loot with his crew. He sailed back to Jamaica to determine whether he would be allowed to keep his loot and go free, and “if he found he could not, he gave out that he would return to Providence and settle amongst the rovers.”

Later in 1716, he was reported as sailing alongside Henry Jennings, Benjamin Hornigold, and Olivier Levasseur, using New Providence as his home port. That same year Hamilton issued a proclamation demanding that Jennings, Fernando, James Carnegie, Leigh Ashworth, and others surrender to authorities, but Hamilton was soon removed from power over corruption charges. Despite this, by 1717, Hamilton's successor, Nicholas Lawes, declared that England would not make any restitution to the Spanish for various offenses, including Fernando's capture of the Nuestra Señora de Belen.

== See also ==
- Nicholas de Concepcion - another pirate captain generally cited as mixed-race or black.
