= Drudge =

A drudge is a person who does tedious, menial, or unpleasant work; it can also refer to the work itself, known as drudgery.

Drudge can also refer to:

- Matt Drudge, American Internet journalist
  - Drudge (TV series), Matt Drudge's former TV series
  - Drudge Report, news aggregator run by Matt Drudge
- Drudge Retort, news aggregator run by Rogers Cadenhead
- John Drudge, early 18th century sea captain who ended the career of pirate Nicholas Brown
- Mr. Drudge, a character in the comic strip Motley's Crew
- A race in the MMORPGs Asheron's Call and Asheron's Call 2, playable in the latter
- A race of enemies in the first-person shooter video game The Conduit

== See also ==
- Dredge (disambiguation)
