= Christopher Winter (pirate) =

English pirate

- Years active: 1716–1723
- Known for: Launching the career of Edward England
- Piratical career
- Type: Guarda costa
- Allegiance: Spain
- Base of operations: Caribbean

Christopher Winter (fl. 1716–1723) was an English pirate active in the Caribbean. He is best known for sailing in Spanish service and launching the career of Edward England.

== History ==
Winter was active in the Nassau, Bahamas area in 1716. The following year King George offered a pardon to all pirates who surrendered within a year. Winter kept active, capturing a merchant ship near Jamaica and forcing one of its crewmen, Edward England, into piracy. England embraced piracy and Winter returned with him to the Republic of Pirates on New Providence.

Finally electing not to accept the pardon, Winter sailed with Nicholas Brown to Cuba where they converted to Catholicism and signed on as guarda costa privateers with the Spanish. Winter began attacking English ships and settlements off Jamaica, raiding them for slaves which he took back to Cuba. Governor Nicholas Lawes of Jamaica complained to Spanish officials in Trinidad and Cuba and even sent the warship HMS Happy to demand the return of Winter, Brown, and the ships and slaves they’d captured. The Spanish sheltered Winter and Brown, claiming “as for those English Fugitives you mention, they are here as other Subjects of our Lord the King, being brought voluntarily to our holy Catholick Faith, and have received the Water of Baptism.”

Winter is recorded as active in Spanish service through 1723; despite being called among “the most notorious rogues and renegades of all,” his further activities are not known, and he “otherwise remains a footnote in history.” Brown survived in Spanish service a little longer; he was caught, killed, and decapitated by John Drudge in 1725.

== See also ==
- Charles Vane, Edward England’s captain after leaving Winter, and who also reneged on the King’s pardon
