= John Rackham (disambiguation) =

John Rackham may refer to:

- John Rackham, an 18th century pirate
- John T. Phillifent, an author who used John Rackham as a pseudonym
- Crossed Swords Jolly Roger, a fictional pirate flag sometimes called the Rackham flag.
- Rackhams Cay, a small island off of Port Royal where John Rackham was gibbeted.
