= Maiden Cay =

Islet in Jamaica

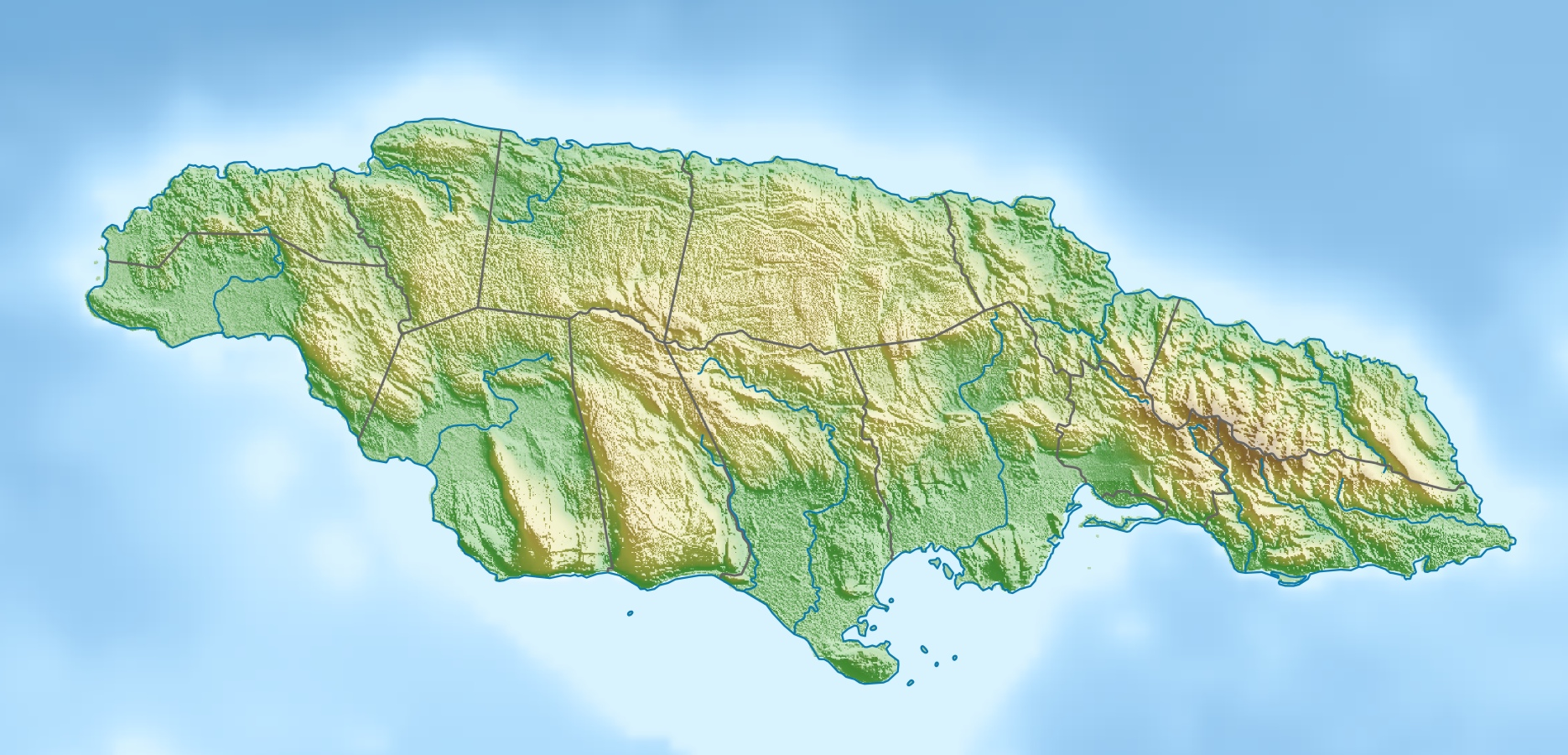
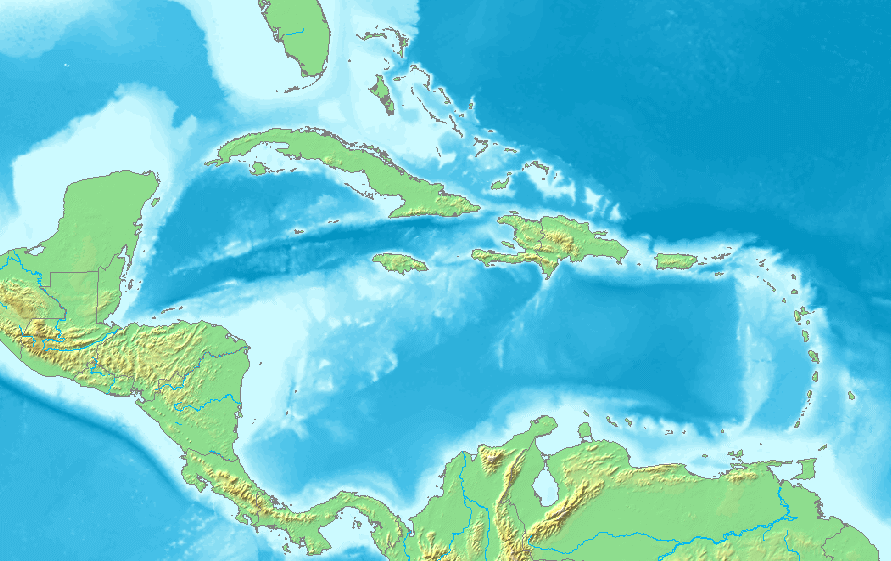

Geography
- Location: Caribbean
- Coordinates: 17°54′32″N 76°48′36″W
- Archipelago: Port Royal Cays
- Total islands: 8
- Major islands: Lime Cay Maiden Cay
- Area: 0.02 km^{2} (0.0077 sq mi)

Administration
- Jamaica
- Parish: Kingston
- Neighborhood: Port Royal

Demographics
- Population: 0 (January, 2024)

Maiden Cay is one of the main islets off the shore of Port Royal Cays, Jamaica. It is located in the northeast region of the reef, just south of its sister cay, Lime Cay.

== Geography ==
Situated roughly 30 – 45 minutes by boat from Port Royal (Kingston, Jamaica), the islet sits within the South East Cay, which flows out into the Caribbean Sea.

Maiden Cay measures below 300 meters in length and below 100 meters in width, measuring between 1 and 2 ha in area. The majority of Maiden Cay is shoreline, and it is uninhabited.

== Culture and history ==
Maiden Cay's mini-beach has served as a hotspot for recreation and socialization amongst Kingston locals and tourists for decades. During Jamaica's "holiday season" (Summer and Christmas) it is common for Jamaican socialites to bring boats out to Maiden Cay, docking in a circular formation encircling the islet, and treat the main beach as a social hub.

Celebrities and people of influence can often be spotted at Maiden Cay. In January 2024, electronic dance music superstar Diplo along with Major Lazer performed a private show in the islet. In another instance, world-record athlete Usain Bolt was pictured enjoying festivities on the islet.
