= Paulsgrave Williams =

Pirate operating during the Golden Age of Piracy

- Born: c. 1675; Newport, Rhode Island
- Disappeared: 1723 (aged c. 48)
- Other names: Paul, Palsgrave, or Palgrave, "William Paul"
- Occupation: Pirate
- Years active: 1716–1723
- Known for: Sailing alongside Samuel Bellamy
- Piratical career
- Base of operations: Caribbean, American eastern seaboard, and off West Africa
- Commands: Marianne

Paulsgrave Williams (c. 1675 – after 1723), first name occasionally Paul, Palsgrave, or Palgrave, sometimes "William Paul," was a pirate who was active 1716–1723 and sailed in the Caribbean, American eastern seaboard, and off West Africa. He is best known for sailing alongside Samuel Bellamy.

== History ==
In 1715, Williams, about 40 years old, was living in Boston with his wife and children. There he met Samuel Bellamy, who intended to loot the wrecks of the 1715 Spanish treasure fleet, reportedly to impress the family of Mary Hallett, whose Cape Cod family disapproved of her marrying a poor sailor. Williams' family life and well-to-do lineage made him an unlikely pirate. Together in early 1716 they traveled to the Caribbean with a few dozen treasure-hunters and searched the wrecks unsuccessfully. Despairing, they traded their canoes for small periaguas and turned to piracy.

They were driven off from a captured sloop by the approach of several ships. The approaching ships were not Royal Navy or privateers; they were fellow pirates led by Henry Jennings, James Carnegie, and Leigh Ashworth. They hid in nearby marshes to observe Jennings’ fleet before hailing them. Joining forces, they captured a French ship that happened into the area. Jennings took his group to chase another ship, leaving Bellamy and Williams to loot the French ship, which they promptly did and sailed away before Jennings could return.

Soon they met with Benjamin Hornigold. Impressed with Bellamy and Williams – and no fan of Jennings - Hornigold took them in and joined forces with them alongside Olivier Levasseur’s ship Postillion. While successful, Hornigold’s crew resented his reluctance to attack English ships. They voted him out of command in Spring, electing Bellamy as Captain of Hornigold’s ship Marianne, and placing Hornigold and a few supporters in a captured sloop to make their way back to New Providence. Bellamy appointed Williams as his quartermaster and sailed with Levasseur for several months. Williams and Bellamy continued to operate out of Nassau through 1716. Near the Virgin Islands in December 1716 they captured two ships, Pearl and Sultana. Bellamy transferred to the Sultana, giving Williams the Marianne and letting Pearl go free with all the sailors who refused to take up piracy.

They took several more ships together in the coming months, meeting former pirate John Ham to sell off some captured goods, before Levasseur went his own way. In February 1717 they spotted the slave ship Whydah Gally (occasionally Ouidah, Wedaw, Whido, etc.); they pursued it for three days before it surrendered. Bellamy transferred to the Whydah, giving its captain the Sultana in exchange. Now with one of the largest and best-armed ships on their side of the Atlantic, Williams and Bellamy sailed northward, pillaging ships up the American east coast. Separated by fog and storms off Virginia, they soon met up again and sailed toward Rhode Island. Bellamy granted the captured ship Anne Galley to his quartermaster Richard Noland. They agreed to meet off the coast of Maine; Bellamy took the Whydah back toward Cape Cod with Noland while Williams put in at Block Island in mid-April to visit relatives.

While waiting off Maine in May 1717 Williams learned that the Whydah and one of Bellamy's prize ships had been caught in a terrible storm that April and were wrecked on the coast with almost all hands lost, including Samuel Bellamy. Williams may have visited the site of the wreck before sailing back south to New Providence. Williams had a number of sailors on board whom he'd forced into piracy, including his carpenter; on the way south he had to put down a mutiny among his crew when a number of them (led by the forced sailors) rebelled. He arrived in the Bahamas at almost the same time as Noland, who had survived the storm that claimed Whydah. He sold the worn-out Marianne and along with Hornigold and many others, accepted the pardon offered by King George to all pirates who surrendered by September 1718.

Williams was soon back at sea, serving first under William Moody and then as quartermaster under his old accomplice Olivier Levasseur in 1720 off the coast of Africa. He was said to be unhappy no longer being in command, and sailors were advised to continue calling him “Captain” to get on his good side. Some sources claim that Williams retired from piracy in 1723 to settle down with a new wife and family, dying peacefully sometime in 1723 or after, though this is not attested in period sources.
