= Capture of John Rackham =

1720 naval engagement off Negril

Coordinates: 18.316°N 78.350°W

- Part of the Golden Age of Piracy
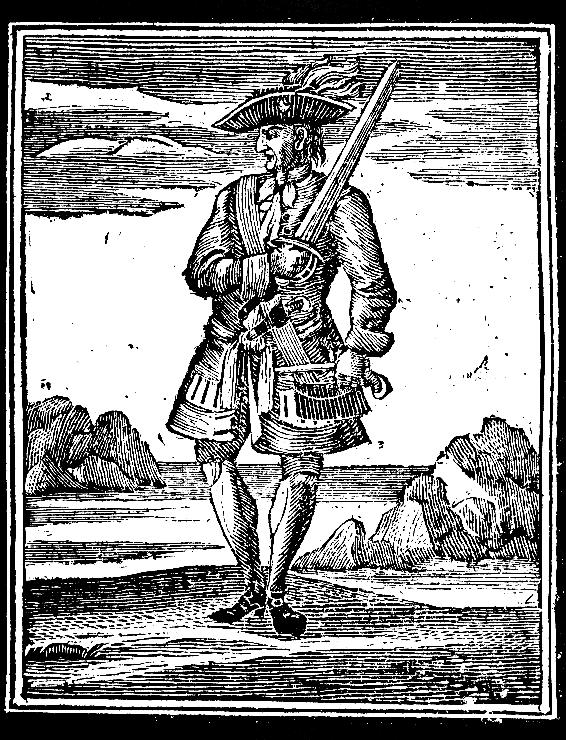
- An engraving of Rackham from Charles Johnson's A General History of the Pyrates.
Date	c. October 22, 1720
Location	Off Negril, Caribbean Sea
Result	British victory

Belligerents
Great Britain	Pirates

Commanders and leaders
Jonathan Barnet	John Rackham (surrendered)

Strength
1 sloop	1 sloop

Casualties and losses
None	13 captured 1 sloop captured

The capture of John Rackham was a single-ship action fought between English pirate John Rackham and former privateer Jonathan Barnet. The engagement was fought in the vicinity of Negril, Jamaica and ended with the capture of Rackham and his crew after a short period of time.

== Background ==
Rackham commanded the William, a small but fast twelve-ton sloop originally owned by John Ham during the action. Her armament was light, consisting of four cannons and two swivel guns. At the time of the engagement, the William carried a crew of fourteen including Rackham and the pirates Mary Read and Anne Bonny.

On August 22, 1720, Rackham and 12 other men plus the two women stole the William from Nassau harbor.

Governor Woodes Rogers dispatched pirate hunters but to no avail - Rackham and his crew plundered fishing boats, sloops, and a schooner across the Caribbean for two months.

Around mid October 1720, former privateer Jonathan Barnet set sail from Jamaica in a trading sloop alongside another sloop commanded by a captain Bonadvis (Note: Likely the trader and former pirate Jean Bonadvis.).

The encounter is remembered more for its participants than the actual combat.

== Capture ==
On October 22 near Negril Point, Bonadvis spotted Rackham, who was firing a cannon. Bonadvis reported the unknown ship's location to Barnet, but did not participate in the engagement. Rackham's sloop was laid at anchor and had recently brought onto the ship a group of turtlers who were having punch with Rackham and the crew.

At around 10 PM, Rackham noticed Barnet's sloop and attempted to flee, but Barnet caught up to them. Barnet called out to the sloop and requested they identify themselves. The reply was "John Rackham from Cuba" and Barnet immediately ordered him to strike his colors. Someone (Barnet testified that because of it being so dark he could not identify who) replied that they would "strike no strike" and fired a swivel gun at Barnet's sloop. Barnet ordered a cannon broadside and a rifle volley, which destroyed the boom on Rackham's ship, after which the pirates called for quarter.

Barnet had the pirates put ashore at Davis's Cove near Lucea where Major Richard James, a militia officer, placed them under arrest.

== Aftermath ==
Rackham and his crew were brought to Spanish Town, Jamaica, in November 1720, where they were tried and convicted of piracy and sentenced to be hanged. Rackham was executed on 18 November and gibbeted on Rackham's Cay at the entrance of Port Royal. The remains of the other pirates were placed at various locations around the port. Mary Read and Anne Bonny avoided hanging by claiming that they were pregnant; Read died several months later in April 1721, while Bonny was never heard from again. (Note: An "Ann Bonny" was recorded as buried in Spanish Town on December 29, 1733, though this is not confirmed to have been the pirate.)
