= Nicholas de Concepcion =

Nicolás de la Concepción (fl. 1720, also known as "Nicholas of the Conception") was a Spanish privateer active off the New England coast. An escaped slave, he was one of the few black or mulatto pirate captains.

== History ==
Sailing from his base in Saint Augustine as a Spanish guarda costa privateer, de Concepcion’s 140-man multi-national crew captured several ships near the Virginia Capes and Chesapeake Bay in late 1720. Using a Spanish brigantine they captured a sloop out of Philadelphia, then a second vessel, then their third, a pink from Virginia. All three de Concepcion kept as prize ships, sending each back to Saint Augustine in turn. Shortly afterwards he captured the Planter out of Liverpool. The Planter was recaptured on its way back to Saint Augustine and its papers searched. Onboard was found a forged privateering commission from the Governor of Saint Augustine, dated after the War of Spanish Succession and the War of the Quadruple Alliance were long over. de Conception escaped attempts to apprehend him and his crew.

When the War of the Quadruple Alliance ended in early 1720, British and Spanish officials agreed to return ships captured by each other's privateers; the Spanish at St. Augustine agreed to make restitution for ships captured by Richard Noland, but "as for others which they say were taken by Nicholas of the Conception, they did not come here, excepting a sloop loaden with flower, the which was returned to the Captain and afterwards bought on the account of the King, the payment of which hath not been yet made by reason, that the persons have not come that are interested in the same."

== See also ==
- Francis Fernando – another mixed-race pirate captain active only a few years before de Concepcion.
