= Rackham =

Rackham may refer to:

== People ==
- Arthur Rackham (1867–1939), English illustrator and painter
- Bernard Rackham (1876–1964), English museum curator and writer on ceramics and stained glass
- Cameron Rackham (born 1975), New Zealand former professional rugby union player
- Clara Rackham (1875–1966), English politician, social reformer, and pioneering radio broadcaster
- Horace Rackham (1858–1933), American philanthropist and early stockholder in the Ford motor company
- John Rackham (hanged 1720), English pirate
- John Rackham (writer) (1916-1976), English author
- Melinda Rackham (born 1959), Australian networked artist and writer
- Oliver Rackham (1939–2015), English botanist
- Rochelle Rackham (born 1969), English television personality
- Sharon Rackham (born 1974), Australian Paralympic athlete
- Simon Rackham (born 1964), English composer and artist

== Characters ==
- Mazer Rackham, from Ender's Game by Orson Scott Card
- Red Rackham, from the Tintin comic books by Hergé

== Places ==
- Rackham Lane, Oxford, England
- Rackham, West Sussex, England

== Other ==
- HMS Rackham (M2722) (launched 1956), a minesweeper
- Rackhams, trading name of House of Fraser
- Rackham Graduate School of the University of Michigan
- Rackham (company), defunct French miniature and role-playing games production company
