= John Drudge =

Early 18th-century Caribbean privateer and smuggler

- Piratical career
- Type: Smuggler and Privateer
- Years active: 1714-1726
- Rank: Captain
- Base of operations: Jamaica
- Commands: Pearle, sloop Portland

John Drudge was a smuggler and privateer operating in the Caribbean in the early 18th century. He is best known for his involvement in the capture and death of pirate Nicholas Brown.

== History ==
A 1725 letter to Parliament lists a number of ships captured by the Spanish in the Caribbean during the War of the Spanish Succession; Drudge's Jamaica-based ship Pearle was listed among the victims (Note: Another victim of the Spanish was Matthew Musson, who would also become an anti-pirate privateer.), taken in 1714 as the war ended.

A few years later Drudge himself had been accused of smuggling slaves and goods to French and Dutch ports in 1725: "Resolved, It appearing to this House, that ... John Drudge (Note: Drudge was listed with several other perpetrators; among his fellow smugglers was M. Bonfils, a Frenchman whose vessel was plundered by pirates Samuel Bellamy, Henry Jennings, and Leigh Ashworth.) ... [was] concerned in the said Clandestine Trade with the Dutch and French. That an Address be presented to his Grace, desiring he will be pleased to give Directions to the Attorney General, to prosecute them for the same." Gabriel, 3rd Marquis Duquesne had been Commander of the fort at Jamaica and was accused of assisting the smugglers, writing a pamphlet defending his actions: "A small Share I had in Company with several Merchants of Port-Royal and Kingston, and particularly with the Deputy Naval Officer, in a Voyage of Negroes, undertook by one Captain John Drudge to Hispagniola, which might perhaps have occasioned that formidable Accusation abovementioned, because he met in the Way with a Dutch Ship, and of his own Accord exchanged with him Negroes and Indigo for some dry Goods, which at his Return were proportionably distributed to the Parties concerned, with their Share of Indigo... I hope my small Concern in Captain Drudge's Voyage, whereof I have given your Lordship an Account above, can never be construed as a Breach of my Duty as Commander of the Fort."

Pirate Nicholas Brown had accepted a 1718 pardon from Woodes Rogers in the Bahamas, but quickly resumed piracy off the Jamaican coast. He retreated to Cuba to accept Spanish protection. In 1721 Sir Nicholas Lawes, Governor of Jamaica, offered a £500 reward for Brown's capture but Brown evaded the authorities for five more years. Drudge sailed his sloop Portland to Cuba in October 1726 where he sent some of his crew ashore alongside Dutch allies to hunt the Spanish. Most of his men retreated from a skirmish but three of them returned with prisoners, a wounded Brown (said to be a former schoolmate of Drudge's) among the captives. Brown died of his wounds en route to Jamaica; Drudge decaptitated him and preserved his head in a rum keg, claiming the reward uncontested.

Drudge and the Dutch may have been on a smuggling mission when he found Brown: in testimony he gave in March 1725, he recounted how the Spanish would send intermediaries to trade with foreigners, sending them “through the woods, and not in the road, in order to prevent their being discovered by the royal officers.”
