= John Massey (pirate) =

- Born: 1695 or earlier
- Died: 26 July 1723; London
- Piratical career
- Allegiance: United Kingdom, Royal African Company
- Rank: Captain Lieutenant Engineer
- Base of operations: Gambia
- Commands: Bumper / Gambia Castle / Delivery

John Massey (died 1723) was a Royal African Company military officer. He is best known for leaving his post in Gambia along with his soldiers to sail with pirate George Lowther.

== History ==
Earlier in his life Massey had served at the 1708 Siege of Lille during the War of Spanish Succession, and at several other land battles.

Sent to garrison the RAC fort at Gambia, Massey found the post almost devoid of supplies. Merchants and victuallers charged with arranging food and water for the troops there had been pocketing the allocated funds - “making it their chief study to enrich themselves in a small time by bringing their scant money to a head without having any regard to ye Company’s interest” - and sending little or no supplies to the fort, and its sickly Governor was unable to help.

George Lowther, second mate of the supply ship Gambia Castle, (Note: The ship was renamed twice, leading to confusion in the records. It began as Bumper, which Massey called it; the RAC renamed it Gambia Castle, causing crewman Alexander Thompson to call it “Gamboa Castle;” and Lowther renamed it Delivery.) took over the ship and invited Massey and his troops to join them. Faced with a life of sickness and starvation, Massey and his men agreed. Departing Gambia in June 1721, Massey initially wanted only to return to England, but Lowther convinced him to engage in piracy, upon which the crew “took oaths and entered into Articles in Writing for that purpose and prepared black Colours.” (Note: Lowther's Articles are recorded in Charles Johnson's only partially reliable General History of the Pyrates but not attested elsewhere; these may have been the Articles of Lowther's offshoot Edward Low instead.) They soon captured a brigantine from Boston, taking its supplies but leaving a few RAC goods in trade, then a French sloop, then other vessels off St. Croix and Hispaniola.

Massey offered to guide his troops in raiding French settlements in the Caribbean but Lowther refused, preferring to stick to piracy at sea. Increasingly dissatisfied with their arrangement, Massey and some of his troops boarded a captured schooner and left Lowther. Massey asked Governor Nicholas Lawes of Jamaica for a pardon, who directed him to London. When he arrived he penned a confession, explaining his reasons for leaving Gambia, and waited impatiently for his arrest. Imprisoned at Newgate, he was tried on July 5, 1723, and found guilty of piracy despite being described as “said to be in some Measure disturb'd in his Head.” Massey was hanged shortly afterwards, denied the execution by firing squad he had requested.

But this was surely a rash Action, for I never design'd or intended to turn Pirate, and I am very sorry for it, and I wish it was in my Power to make Amends to the Honourable African Company for what they have lost by my Means. ... John Massey.

== See also ==
- Philip Roche - tried for piracy at the same time as Massey
