= John Rackham =

English pirate (died 1720)

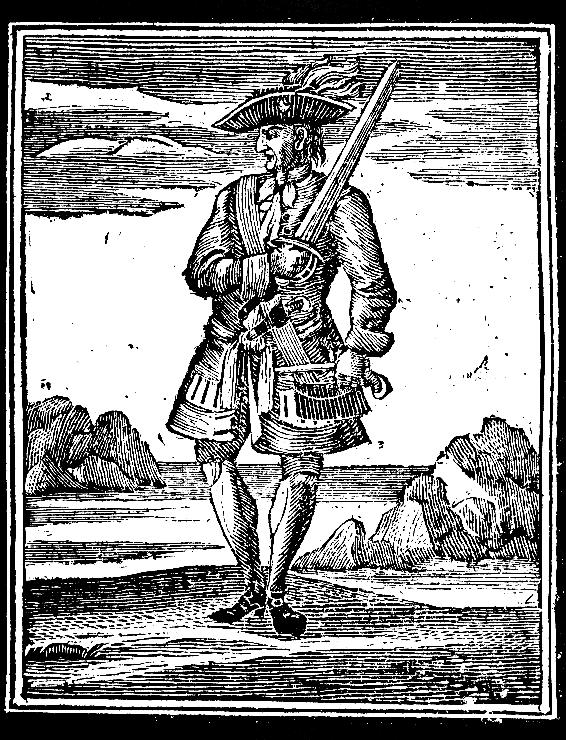
- A woodcut of Rackham from Captain Charles Johnson's 1724 book A General History of the Pyrates
- Born: November 1673; Linstead Parva
- Died: 18 November 1720 (aged 46–47); Port Royal, Colony of Jamaica
- Piratical career
- Type: Pirate
- Years active: August – October 1720
- Rank: Captain
- Base of operations: West Indies
- Commands: William (briefly)
- Battles: Capture of John Rackham

John Rackham (Note: Rackham is often spelled as Rackam or Rackum in historical documentation and he is also often referred to as Jack Rackham. Other spellings include Racum, Racan, Raccum, Wrackham, and Wrexham.) (November 1673 - 18 November 1720) was an English pirate operating in the Bahamas and Jamaica during the early 18th century. Although only referred to as John Rackham in primary sources, he is best known today by the likely fictional nickname Calico Jack. Rackham was active in 1720, towards the end of the Golden Age of Piracy, and is most remembered for having two female pirate crew members: Anne Bonny and Mary Read, in addition to a fictional flag.

Most of Rackham's life prior to piracy is unknown. The first biography of Rackham comes from Captain Charles Johnson's 1724 book A General History of the Pyrates. According to Johnson, Rackham was a pirate from England who served under Charles Vane before becoming captain. Though Johnson's version of events has become generally accepted, there is little evidence to support it.

Rackham first appears in records around August 1720 after stealing merchant John Ham's sloop from Nassau harbor on 22 August. After a short 61 day run, Rackham was captured by Jonathan Barnet, a former English privateer, on 22 October 1720. Rackham was put on trial by Sir Nicholas Lawes, Governor of Jamaica, and hanged on 18 November that year in Port Royal, Jamaica.

== Early life ==
Little is known of Rackham's upbringing or early life. The surname Rackham is English in origin, originating from the hamlet of Rackham in West Sussex. Many Rackhams are recorded in the Norfolk and Suffolk counties of England throughout the 17th and 18th century. He may be the John Rackham born in the village of Linstead Parva in 1673. While A General History claimed that he was English, during his short fight with Jonathan Barnet, Rackham said he was "From Cuba." This could mean born in Cuba, lived in Cuba, frequented Cuba, or simply was sailing from Cuba. Unlike his associates Anne Bonny and Mary Read, no descriptions of Rackham's clothing were given during his trial, alongside no physical descriptions nor mention of his age or national origin. Claims of wearing calico clothing is not contemporary and thus not proveable. Prior to August 1720, it is difficult to say anything definitive about John Rackham's early life.

=== Early life according to A General History of the Pyrates ===
All details concerning Rackham's early life stem from Captain Charles Johnson's A General History of the Pyrates (a greatly unreliable series of pirate biographies). Johnson claims Rackham began his pirate career as a quartermaster on Charles Vane's brigantine Ranger, operating out of New Providence island in the Bahamas, which had been a notorious "pirates nest" led by Benjamin Hornigold since 1713. Vane and his crew robbed several ships outside New York City, then encountered a large French man-of-war. The ship was at least twice as large as Vane's brigantine, and it immediately pursued them. Vane commanded a retreat from battle, claiming caution as his reason. John Rackham quickly spoke up and contested the decision, suggesting that they fight the man-of-war because it would have plenty of riches. In addition, he argued, if they captured the ship, it would place a much larger ship at their disposal. Of the approximately ninety-one men on the ship, only fifteen supported Vane in his decision. Vane declared that the captain's decision is considered final and despite the overwhelming support for Rackham's cry to fight they fled the man-of-war. On 24 November 1718, Rackham called a vote in which the men branded Vane a coward and removed him from the captaincy, making Rackham the next captain. Rackham gave Vane and his fifteen supporters the other ship in the fleet, along with a decent supply of ammunition and goods. According to Charles Vane's trial transcript, a crew vote did occur leading to his ouster. However the quartermaster is unnamed, making it unclear if Rackham was actually associated with Vane.

== Pirate career ==
Despite claims from A General History, John Rackham does not appear in records prior to August 1720. His name was not on Vincent Pearse's list of pirates who surrendered upon promise of a pardon, nor does any newspaper mention him by name. In all likelihood, Rackham was not even a pirate until the year 1720.

=== Pirate career according to A General History ===
Captain Charles Johnson writes that, in 1719, Rackham sailed into Nassau in the Bahamas, taking advantage of a general amnesty for pirates to obtain a royal pardon and commission from Governor Woodes Rogers. Rogers had been sent to the Bahamas to address the problem of pirates in the West Indies who had started to attack and steal from British ships.

In December, he captured the merchant ship Kingston. The Kingston had a rich cargo, and promised to be a big score for Rackham and his crew. Unfortunately for him, the Kingston had been taken within sight of Port Royal, where outraged merchants outfitted bounty hunters to go after him. They caught up with him in February 1719, while his ship and the Kingston were anchored at Isla de los Pinos off Cuba. Rackham and most of his men were on shore at the time, escaping capture by hiding in the woods, but their ship and rich trophy were taken away.

In reality the Kingston was stolen by Captain Joseph Thompson and not John Rackham.

Rackham and his men were at a town in Cuba refitting their small sloop when a Spanish warship charged with patrolling the Cuban coast entered the harbour, along with a small English sloop which they had captured. The Spanish warship saw the pirates but could not get at them at low tide, so they anchored in the harbour entrance to wait for morning. That night, Rackham and his men rowed over to the captured English sloop and overpowered the Spanish guards there. As dawn broke, the warship began blasting Rackham's old ship, now empty, as Rackham and his men silently sailed past in their new prize.

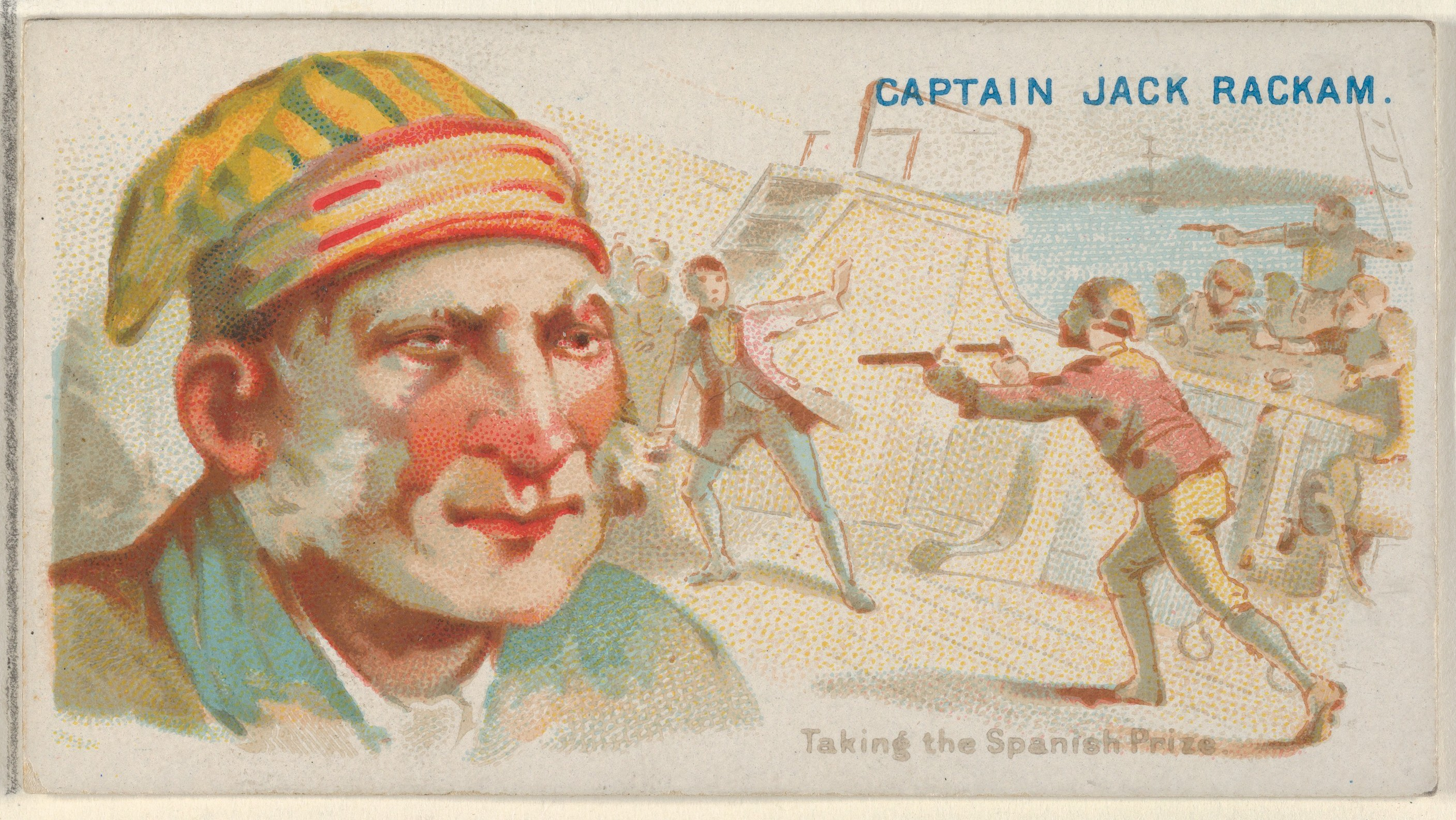
Captain Jack Rackham, Taking the Spanish Prize, from the Pirates of the Spanish Main series (N19) for Allen & Ginter Cigarettes MET DP835040

Rackham and his men made their way back to Nassau, where they appeared before Governor Rogers and asked for the royal pardon, claiming that Vane had forced them to become pirates. Rogers hated Vane and chose to believe them, granting them the pardon and allowing them to stay. Their time as honest men, however, did not last long.

=== Anne Bonny ===
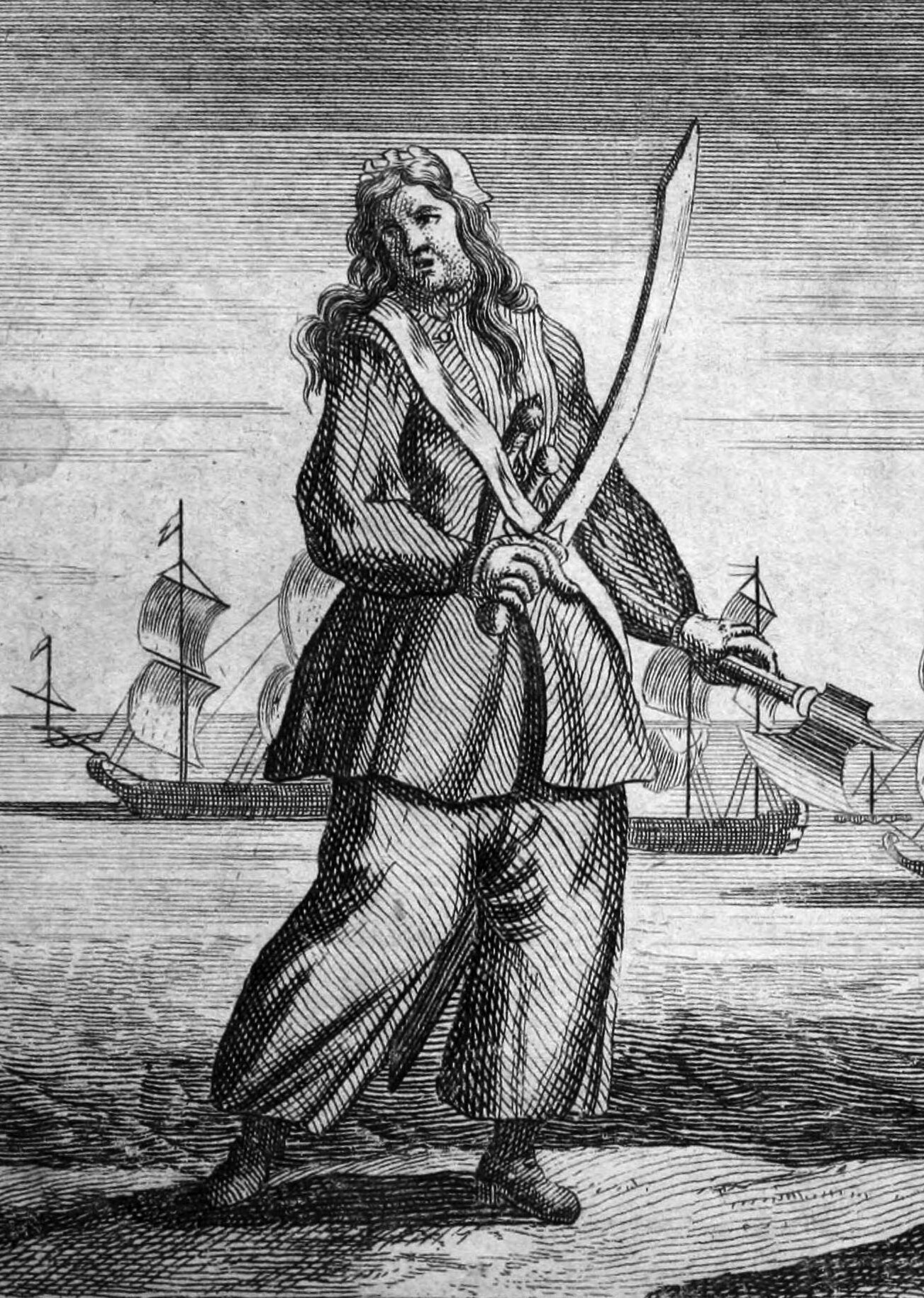
1724 engraving of Bonny from A General History of the Pyrates

A General History claims after taking the pardon, Rackham began an affair with a woman named Anne Bonny. Johnson claims Bonny had come to Nassau with her husband, and the two became pirates shortly sometime after. Bonny is referred to as a spinster in her trial making this claim unlikely. What relationship Bonny had with Rackham, and why they decided to become pirates, is unclear.

On 22 August 1720, Rackham, Bonny, and a crew including another woman, Mary Read, stole the merchant sloop William owned by merchant and former pirate John Ham. Rackham managed to escape Nassau harbor with ease, beginning a short pirate career.

== Capture, trial and death ==
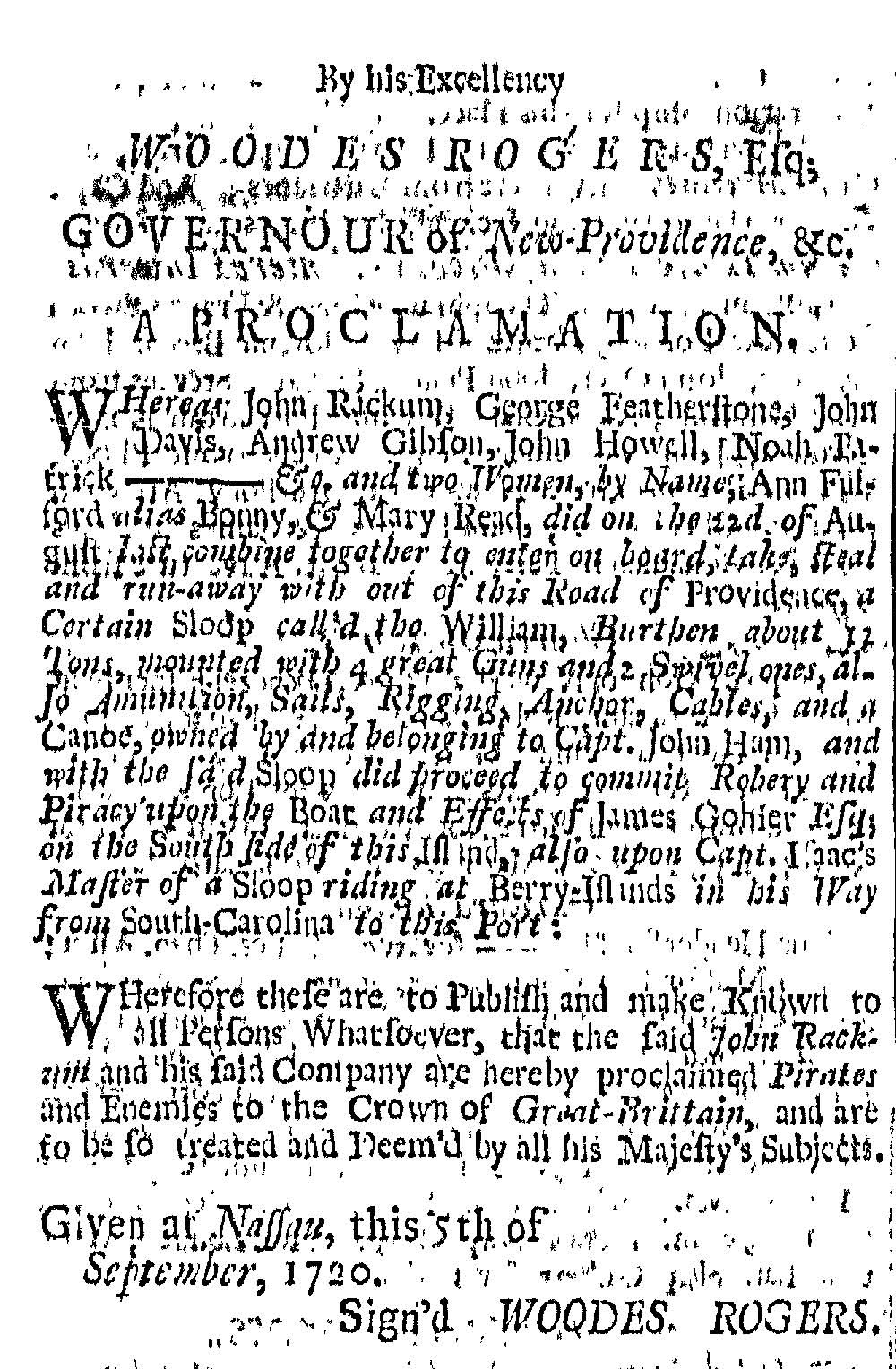
A 1720 proclamation from Woodes Rogers naming John Rackham and his crew as pirates

In September 1720, Bahamian Governor Woodes Rogers issued a proclamation declaring Rackham and his crew pirates—although it was not published in the American Colonies until October 1720. After publication of the warrant, Rackham continued his spree, capturing numerous small fishing vessels and terrorizing fishermen along the northern Jamaican coastline. In mid October, former privateer Jonathan Barnet and a captain named Bonadvis left Jamaica in two trading sloops.

Rackham and his crew had been sailing west, towards Negril. On 22 October 1720, Rackham's sloop was laid at anchor and fired a gun which caught the attention of Bonadvis' sloop. Bonadvis reported this to Barnet who sailed to investigate the sloop. At 10 PM Barnet called out to the sloop and inquired who they were. The reply was "John Rackham from Cuba" and Barnet immediately ordered him to strike his colors. Someone (Barnet testified that because of it being so dark he could not identify who) replied, "We shall strike no strike" and fired a swivel gun at Barnet's sloop, missing. Barnet ordered a broadside which destroyed the boom on Rackham's ship and his crew called for quarter.

Barnet had the men put ashore at Davis's Cove near Lucea, Jamaica, where Major Richard James, a militia officer, placed them under arrest. Rackham and his crew were brought to Spanish Town, Jamaica, in November 1720, where they were tried and convicted of piracy and sentenced to be hanged.

Rackham was executed in Port Royal on 18 November 1720. According to writer James Knight, Rackham was beheaded and his head was gibbeted on a very small cay at the main entrance to Port Royal known as Plumb-Point. By the 1750s, it had become known as Rackham's Cay.

== Fate of his crew ==
Anne Bonny and Mary Read both claimed to be pregnant at their trials, ten days after Rackham's execution, and so were given a temporary stay. Whether they were actually pregnant is debatable. Read died in late April 1721, cause unknown. There is no historical record of Bonny's release or of her execution, although there does exist a burial record for an Ann Bonny in 1733.

George Fetherston (Master), Richard Corner (Quarter-Master), John Davis, and John Howell were executed along with John Rackham in Port Royal. Patrick Carty, Thomas Earl, James Dobbin and Noah Harwood were executed the next day in Kingston.

Nine men who had been caught drinking with Rackham's crew (John Eaton, Edward Warner, Thomas Baker, Thomas Quick, John Cole, Benjamin Palmer, Walter Rouse, John Hanson, and John Howard) were tried and convicted on 24 January 1721. On 17 February John Eaton, Thomas Quick and Thomas Baker were executed at Gallows Point, at Port Royal, and the next day John Cole, John Howard and Benjamin Palmer, were executed at Kingston. The fate of the remaining three (Edward Warner, Walter Rouse and John Hanson) is unknown.

== Crossed Swords Jolly Roger ==
The Crossed Swords Jolly Roger pirate flag erroneously associated with Rackham

The "white pendant" flag used by Rackham

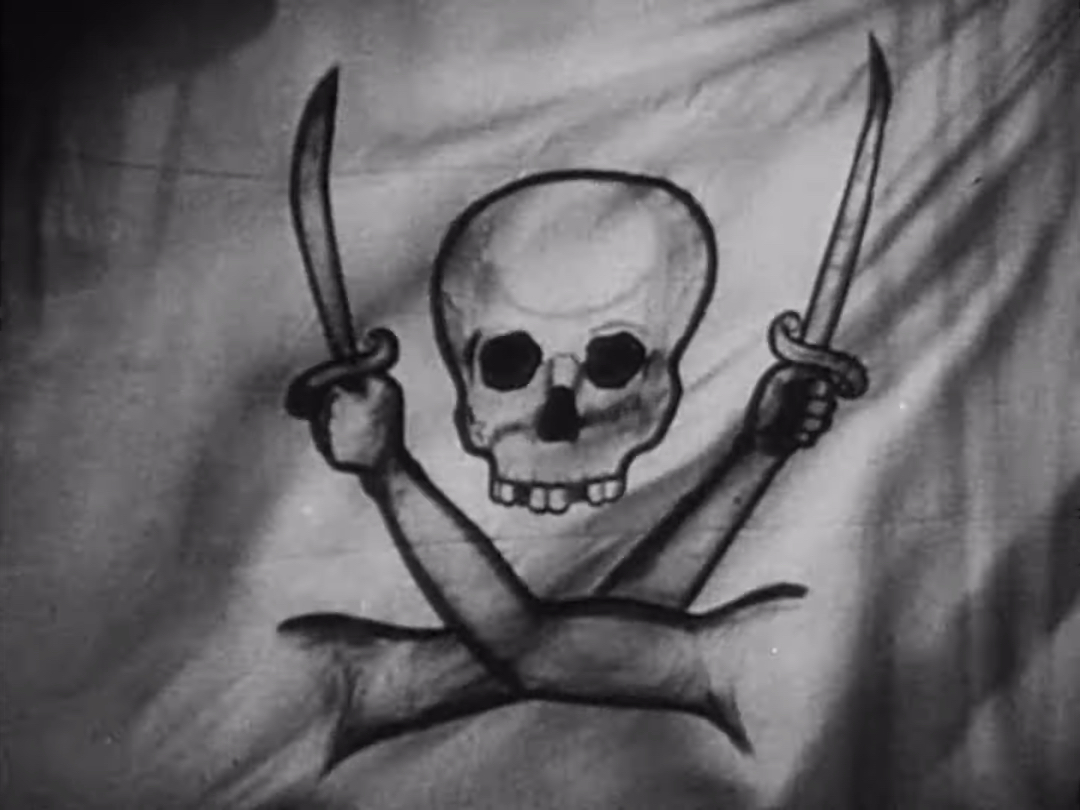
The Jolly Roger from Captain Blood, likely the inspiration for the Crossed Swords Jolly Roger

The flag commonly associated with Rackham depicts a white skull above crossed swords on a black background, and Rackham is sometimes credited with inventing or designing the Jolly Roger design. At trial, however, no witness described Rackham ever using such a flag, only noting that his sloop flew "a white pendant" (pennon). A General History also makes no mention of a flag. The skull-and-crossed-swords design likely dates to the early 20th century, and attaching it to Rackham can be traced to a 1959 book by Hans Leip, Bordbuch des Satans.

== Calico Jack nickname ==
During Rackham's life, all primary sources referred to him as John, no colorful nicknames were given by newspapers or his trial transcript. A General Historys first edition in 1724 also makes no mention of any other name for Rackham. It is not until 1728, with the release of the second volume of A General History does "Calico Jack" appear in writing.

This nickname has become ubiquitous in popular culture, although it is unlikely to have been used by Rackham. Pirate trials tended to use nicknames if they had one; the trial of Blackbeard's crew repeatedly uses the nickname "Blackbeard," but Rackham's trial never alludes to any nickname or alias. Its appearance in A General History Volume II is itself suspect as this volume is best known for adding entirely fictional stories like those of Captain Misson.

The very nickname "Calico Jack" is unlikely to be utilized by anyone in Nassau, because in the 18th century, calico had a feminine connotation due to being predominately used for women's clothing, although men certainly did use it.

There does exist a pirate who went by Calico Jack; he was, however, a slave who escaped his master Frederick Philipse and joined a ship bound for Madagascar in 1694. There was also a notable thief named Sarah Wells who went by Calico Sarah.

== Legacy ==
Despite a career of only 61 days and only taking a handful of ships, John Rackham is among the most famous pirates of the Golden Age of Piracy, primarily due to having two female crew members, and the influence of his fictitious flag and nickname.

By the 21st century, Rackham has appeared in hundreds of books, movies, TV programs, and video games.

=== In popular culture ===
The following is not an exhaustive list:

- Rackham is featured in the 2013 video game Assassin's Creed IV: Black Flag as a side character and minor antagonist, voiced by O-T Fagbenle.
- Rackham is one of the major characters in the 2014 Starz television series Black Sails, portrayed by Toby Schmitz.
- Rackham is a character in The Pyrates, by George MacDonald Fraser.
- Rackham is one of nine historical pirates to appear as enemies in Sid Meier's Pirates!
- Rackham is one of sixteen historical pirates selectable as "Pirate King" in Tropico 2: Pirate Cove
- The German heavy metal band Running Wild released a song named "Calico Jack" on their 1988 album Port Royal.
- The pirate Red Rackham (in the Tintin story Red Rackham's Treasure) is named after John Rackham.
- In the manga One Piece, the character Calico Yorki is inspired by Rackham.
- In Our Flag Means Death, Calico Jack (played by Will Arnett) appears as an old friend of Blackbeard's in episode 8 "We Gull Way Back".
