= Port Royal Cays =

Group of islands off Port Royal, Jamaica

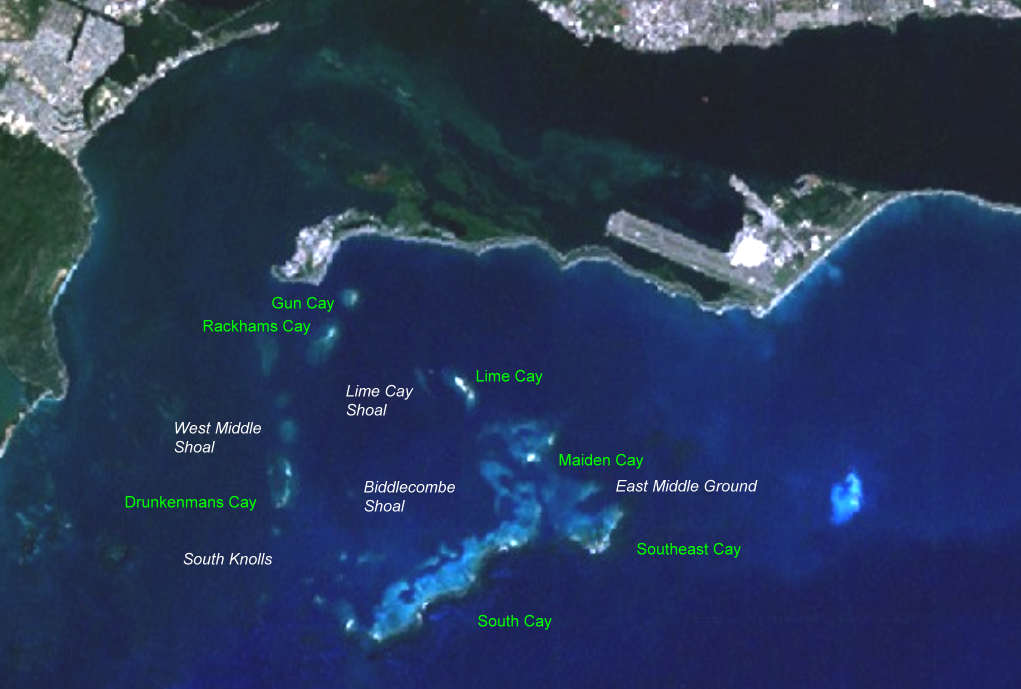
- NASA Visible Color Landsat image of Port Royal Cays, with islets and shoals

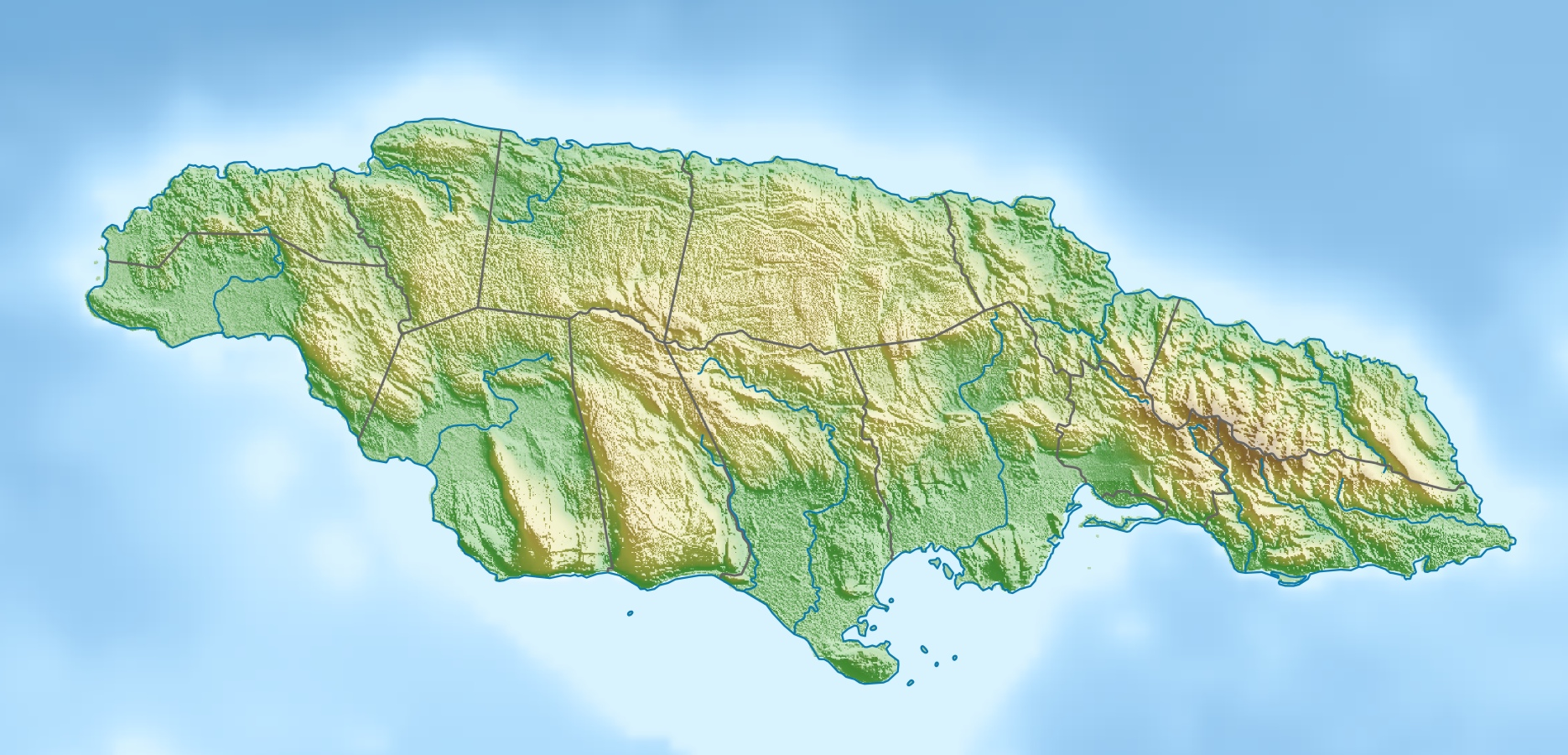
- Location within Jamaica Location within the Caribbean

Geography
- Location: Caribbean
- Coordinates: 17°55′06.36″N 76°49′11.96″W
- Archipelago: Port Royal Cays
- Total islands: 8
- Major islands: Lime Cay
- Area: 0.03 km^{2} (0.012 sq mi)

Administration
- Jamaica
- Parish: Kingston
- Neighborhood: Port Royal

Demographics
- Population: 0

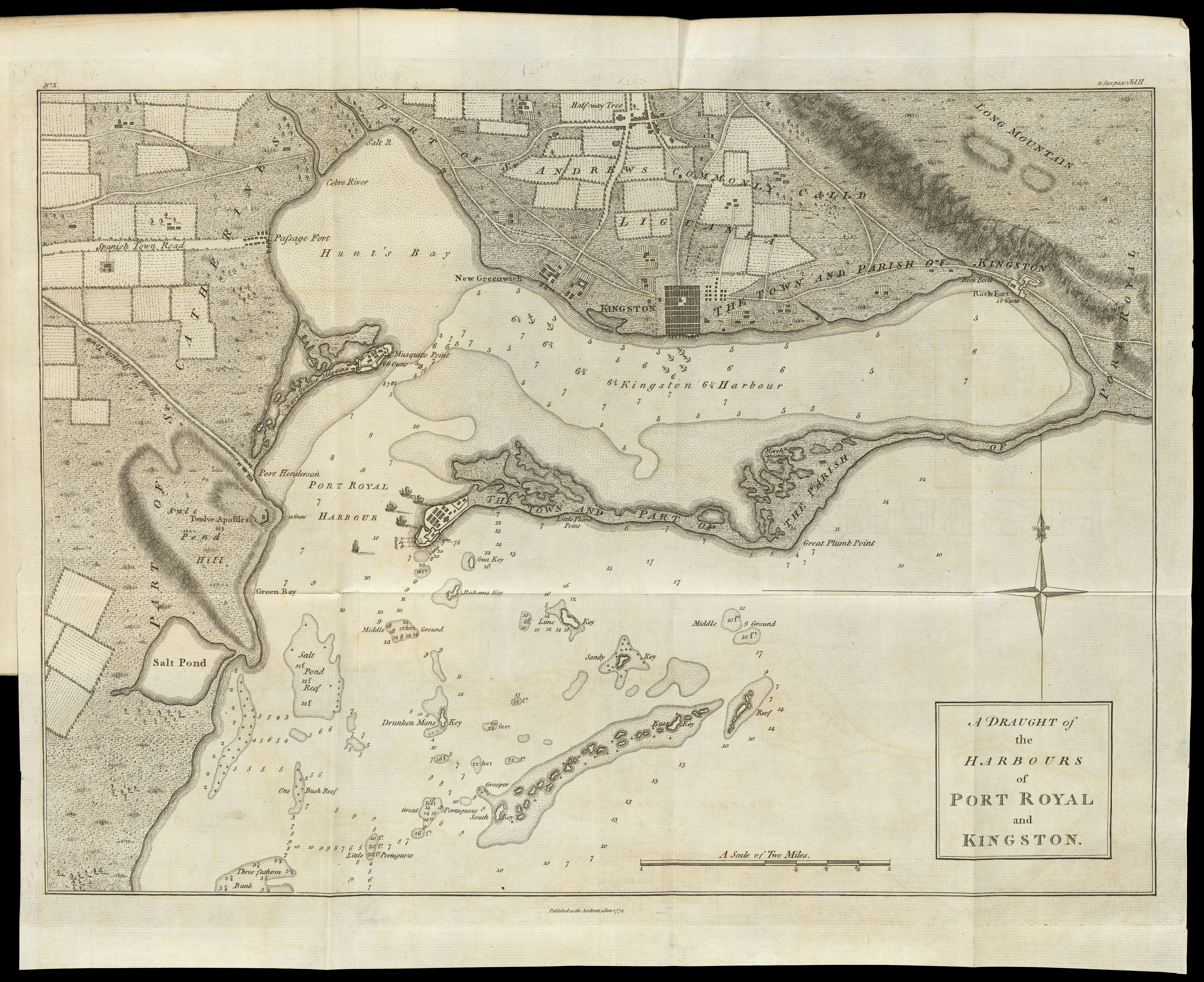
Port Royal Cays on a map of 1774

The Port Royal Cays are a small group of uninhabited islands or cays off Port Royal, Jamaica, located at 17°55′06.36″N 76°49′11.96″W and arranged in the shape of an atoll with a diameter between 4 and 5 km, and a total area of 12 km^{2}. The land area is about 0.03 km^{2}. There are eight named cays, including South Cay Rock which is sometimes subsumed with South Cay.

Gun Cay, the northernmost, is only 400 metres from the Jamaican mainland.

The main cay is Lime Cay, on the northeastern rim. It measures 380 metres northwest–southeast, and is up to 80 metres wide, measuring 2 ha in area. About half of the area is wooded, the rest is sand and coral. On the western beach is a wooden hut.

The individual cays, clockwise starting in the north:

1. Gun Cay (northernmost)
2. Lime Cay (largest, most important)
3. Maiden Cay
4. Southeast Cay (easternmost)
5. South Cay (almost connected with South Cay Rock)
6. South Cay Rock (unvegetated, southernmost)
7. Drunkenmans Cay (westernmost)
8. Rackhams Cay (smallest)

== Literature ==
- T. Goreau and Kevin Burke: "Pleistocene and Holocene Geology of the Island Shelf near Kingston, Jamaica", Marine Geol. 4 (1966), 207-225
