= Samuel Liddell (pirate) =

Caribbean privateer and merchant

- Occupations: Pirate, privateer, and merchant
- Years active: 1716
- Known for: Sailing alongside Henry Jennings
- Piratical career
- Base of operations: Caribbean
- Commands: Cocoa Nut

Samuel Liddell (fl. 1716) was a pirate, privateer, and merchant active in the Caribbean. He is best known for sailing alongside Henry Jennings.

== History ==
Liddell had been master of the vessel Hannah as early as 1713, but was in the Caribbean by early 1716. In March of that year Governor Archibald Hamilton of Jamaica granted a privateering commission to Henry Jennings, who had just returned from plundering the wrecks of the previous years’ Spanish treasure fleet. He would be joined by fellow captains Samuel Liddell in the Cocoa Nut, James Carnegie in the sloop Discovery, and Leigh Ashworth in the Mary. Also aboard Jennings’ ship was future captain Charles Vane.

The group initially headed back to the Spanish wrecks in April; Liddell was a merchant but the Cocoa Nut’s Jamaican owners asked him to forego trading and loot the scattered Spanish silver instead. En route they sighted the French ship Marianne in Bahia Honda. Liddell advised his fellow captains not to attack the French ship, since their privateering commission was only against the Spanish. He offered to go aboard the French ship “to See if they could make a Lawfull prize of her” but Jennings and Ashworth, joined by Samuel Bellamy with his partner Paulsgrave Williams, attacked anyway. They took the French ship with no losses, and Carnegie soon joined them. Twenty-three of Liddell’s crew, including his quartermaster, left him to join the other crews. Carnegie chased a fleeing French vessel which had been stolen by Benjamin Hornigold and Olivier Levasseur; on his return he traded his Discovery for the Marianne. Liddell sailed back to Jamaica rather than sail any further with Jennings and the others, and his subsequent activities are not recorded.

== See also ==
- Nassau, Jennings' "home base" for piracy in the Caribbean.
