= Crossed Swords Jolly Roger =

Modern pirate naval ensign variant

Crossed Swords Jolly Roger.

The Crossed Swords Jolly Roger, or Skull and Crossed Swords Flag, are figurative terms for a popular modern variant of the pirate naval ensign Jolly Roger, whose motif consists of a skull above crossed swords (sabres).

== Design ==
While not historically attested, the design derives from various attestations of historical flags. Naval ensigns featuring swords are attested from before the Golden Age of Piracy. The Dutch Navy is known to have featured a sword arm on their naval attack flag during the Battle of the Sound in 1658. One of the closest historical designs to the Crossed Swords Jolly Roger is the flag of pirate Bartholomew Roberts, which was described by two separate eyewitnesses to have flown a "skull with a sabre or sword-arm on a black field". It should also be noted that crossed swords have been reported as a historical pirate flag motif. One of the flags of French pirate Olivier Levasseur is described as: "… made of black cloth and was painted in the middle a skeleton flanked by scattered bones and crossed cutlasses".

Another root of the design could be the Jolly Roger from the 1935 swashbuckling pirate film Captain Blood, which features a similar motif but with crossed sword arms.

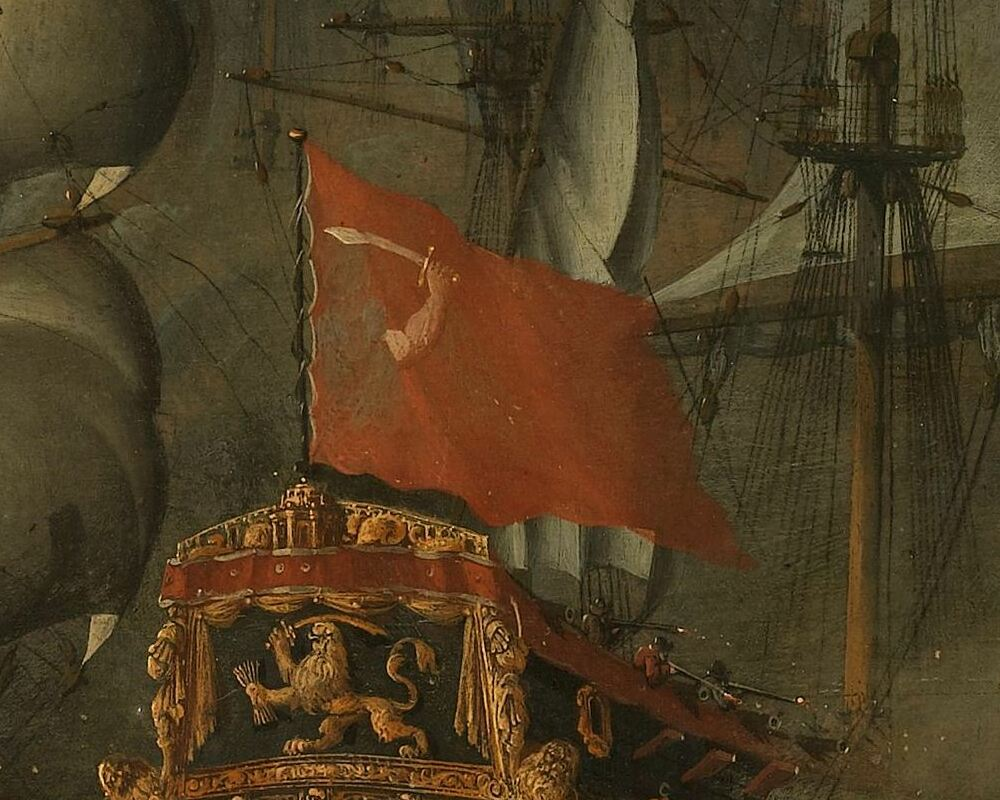
Dutch attack flag during the Battle of the Sound (1658; painted: 1670–1679)

Bartholomew Roberts' flag, interpretation per: "a Black Flag with Death's head and a cutlass in it"

Bartholomew Roberts' flag, interpretation per: "a death's head and an arm with a cutlass"

Olivier Levasseur's flag, interpretation per: "… in the middle a skeleton flanked by scattered bones and crossed cutlasses"

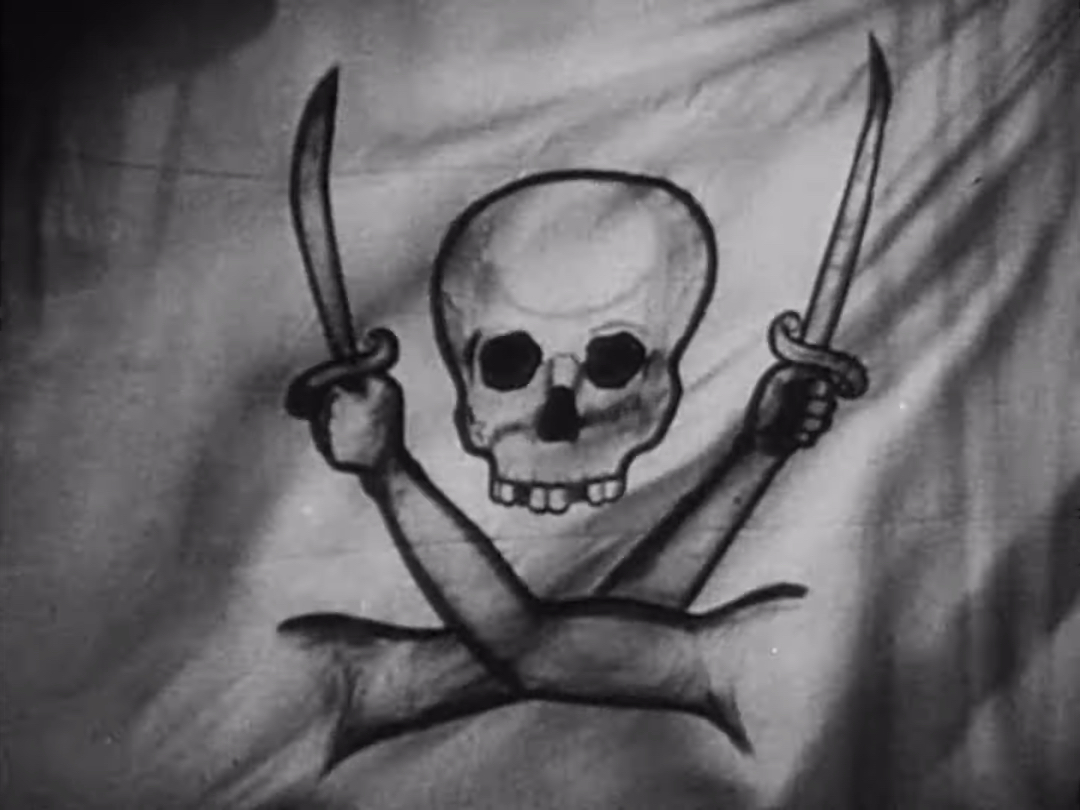
The Jolly Roger from Captain Blood with crossed sword arms.

== Popular culture ==
=== Name ===
The flag is often called the Calico Jack flag, or John Rackham flag, and thereof, referencing the Golden Age pirate John Rackham, with the modern nickname Calico Jack (probably not a period nickname), who in modern popular culture is said to have flown it on his flagship, which originates from the 1959 book Bordbuch des Satans by Hans Leip.

=== Media ===
The flag is widely used in modern pirate media, even though it is not historical.

It has famously been used in the Pirates of the Caribbean film series as the naval ensign of the Black Pearl, the protagonistic pirate ship. In Pirates of the Caribbean: Dead Men Tell No Tales, a modified variant was used by Hector Barbossa on his captured ship, the Queen Anne's Revenge, flying a black motif with golden border on a wine red field.

Variants of the flag have also been used in the manga One Piece. Examples include the Red-Haired Pirates, the Giant Warrior Pirates, the Brownbeard Pirates, and the New Giant Warrior Pirates.

Flag of the Pirate King from The Pirates of Penzance

One-Eyed Willy's pirate flag from The Goonies

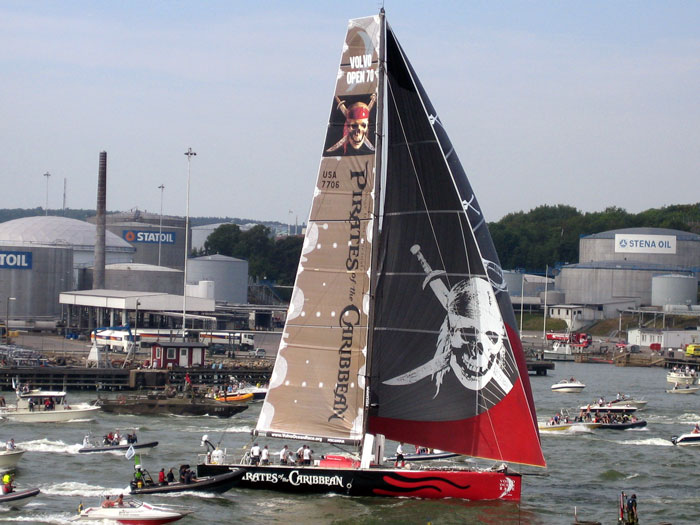
The flag on the rig of a Pirates of the Caribbean themed Volvo Open 70 yacht

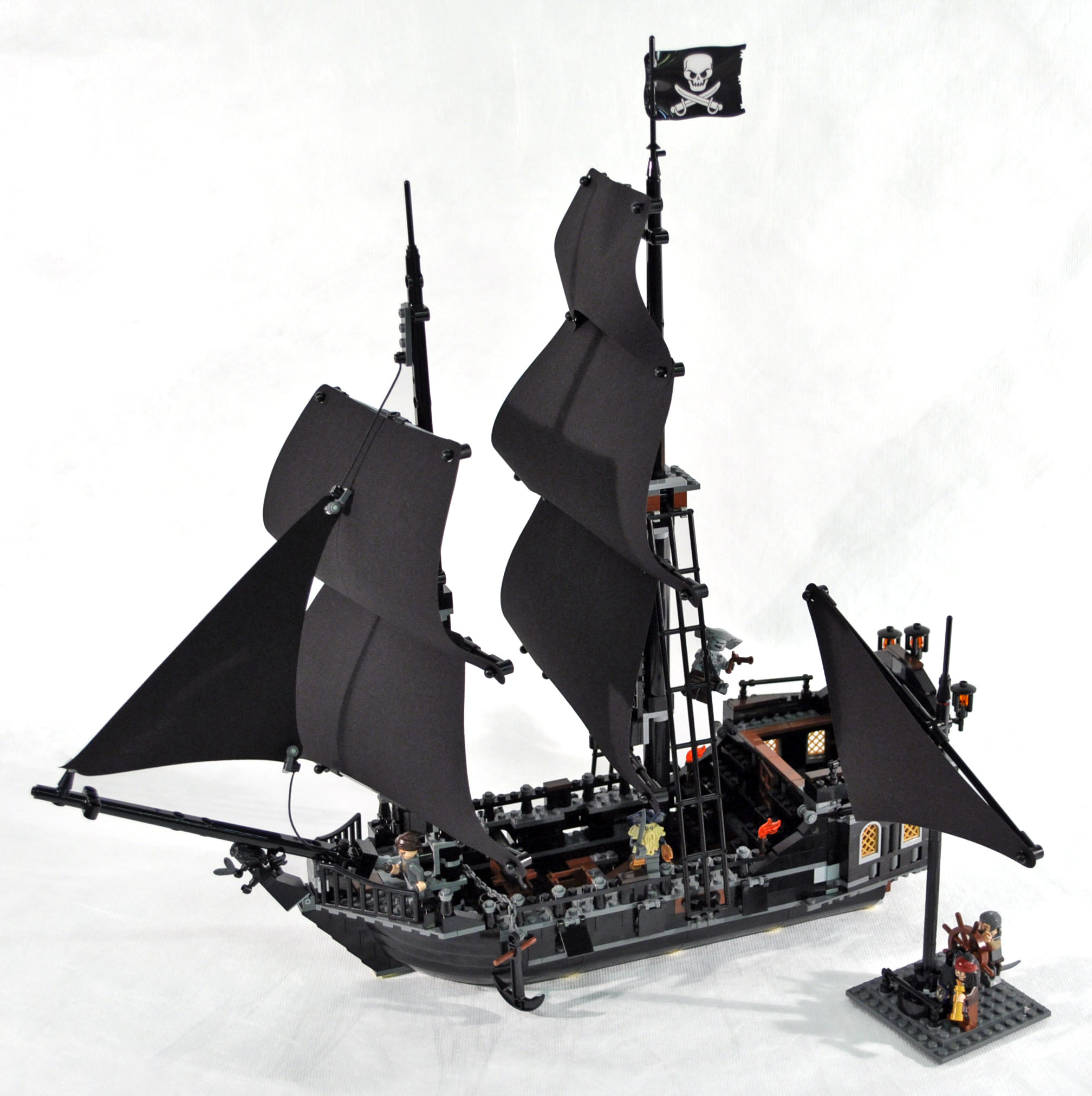
The flag featured on the Black Pearl lego set

Hector Barbossa's flag in Pirates of the Caribbean: Dead Men Tell No Tales

The Misfortune's Keep's pirate flag from Lego Ninjago

Benjamin Hornigold's pirate flag from Black Sails

Jack Rackham's pirate flag from Black Sails

=== Sports ===
The National Football League's Las Vegas Raiders' use a variation of the Crossed Swords Jolly Roger for their logo, which depicts actor Randolph Scott's head with facial features, wearing an eye patch and a helmet, and crossed swords behind the helmet.

Also in the NFL, the Tampa Bay Buccaneers' use a version of the Crossed Swords Jolly Roger, with a carnelian red background instead of black, and an American football positioned over the intersection of two crossed swords.
