= Peter Heywood (governor) =

Chief Justice of Jamaica

Peter Heywood was Governor of Jamaica from 1716–1718.

In 1699, Heywood was a Director of the Bath of St. Thomas the Apostle. He was Chief Justice of Jamaica in 1703 and 1714-15. A plantation owner, he succeeded Lord Archibald Hamilton as governor, and was succeeded by Nicholas Lawes.

From 1716–1717, Thomas Pitt was Governor of Jamaica; however, he resigned the post without having visited the colony.

Government offices
Preceded by Lord Archibald Hamilton	Governor of Jamaica; 1716–1718	Succeeded by Nicholas Lawes
