= Lime Cay =

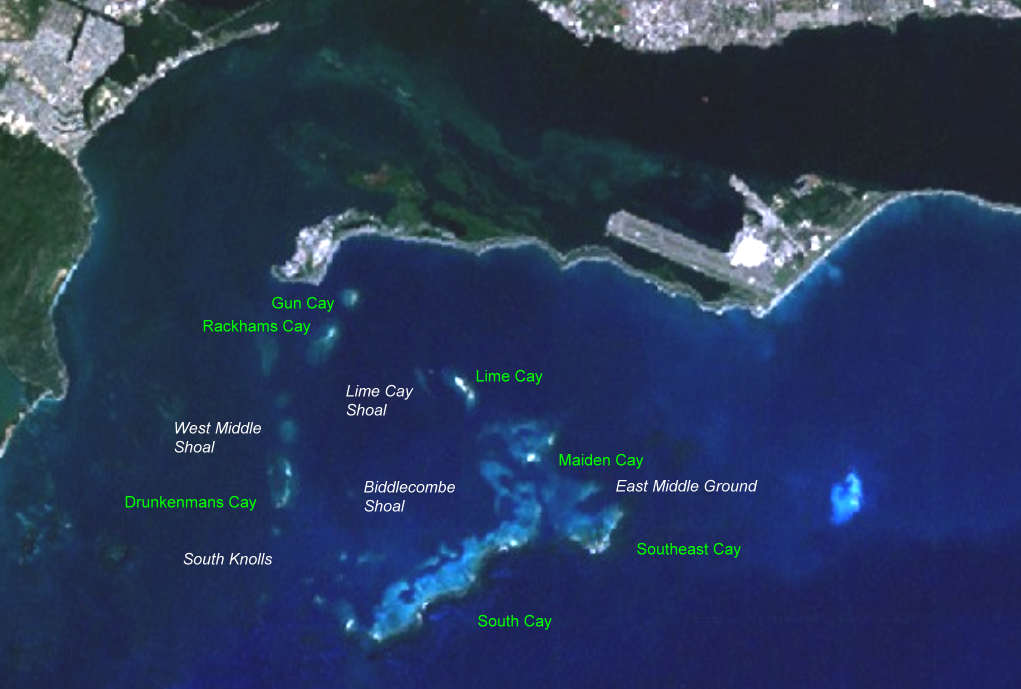
- NASA Visible Color Landsat image of Port Royal Cays, with islets and shoals

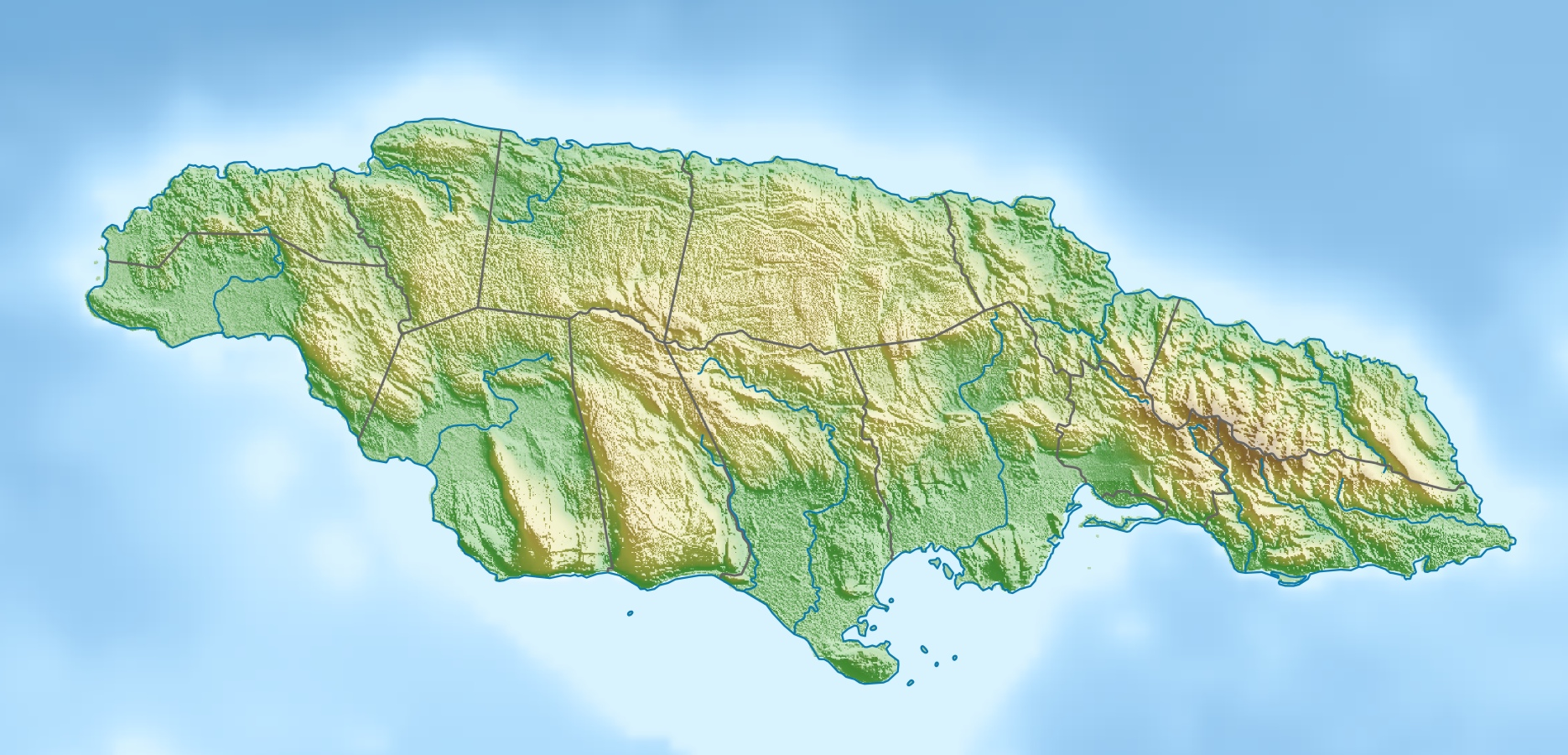
- Location within Jamaica Location within the Caribbean

Geography
- Location: Jamaica, Caribbean
- Coordinates: 17°55′06.36″N 76°49′11.96″W
- Archipelago: Port Royal Cays
- Total islands: 8
- Major islands: Lime Cay, Maiden Cay
- Area: 0.03 km^{2} (0.012 sq mi)

Administration
- Jamaica
- Parish: Kingston
- Neighborhood: Port Royal

Demographics
- Population: 0 (January, 2024)

Lime Cay is the main islet off the shore of Port Royal Cays, Jamaica. It is located in the northeast region of the reef.

== Geography ==
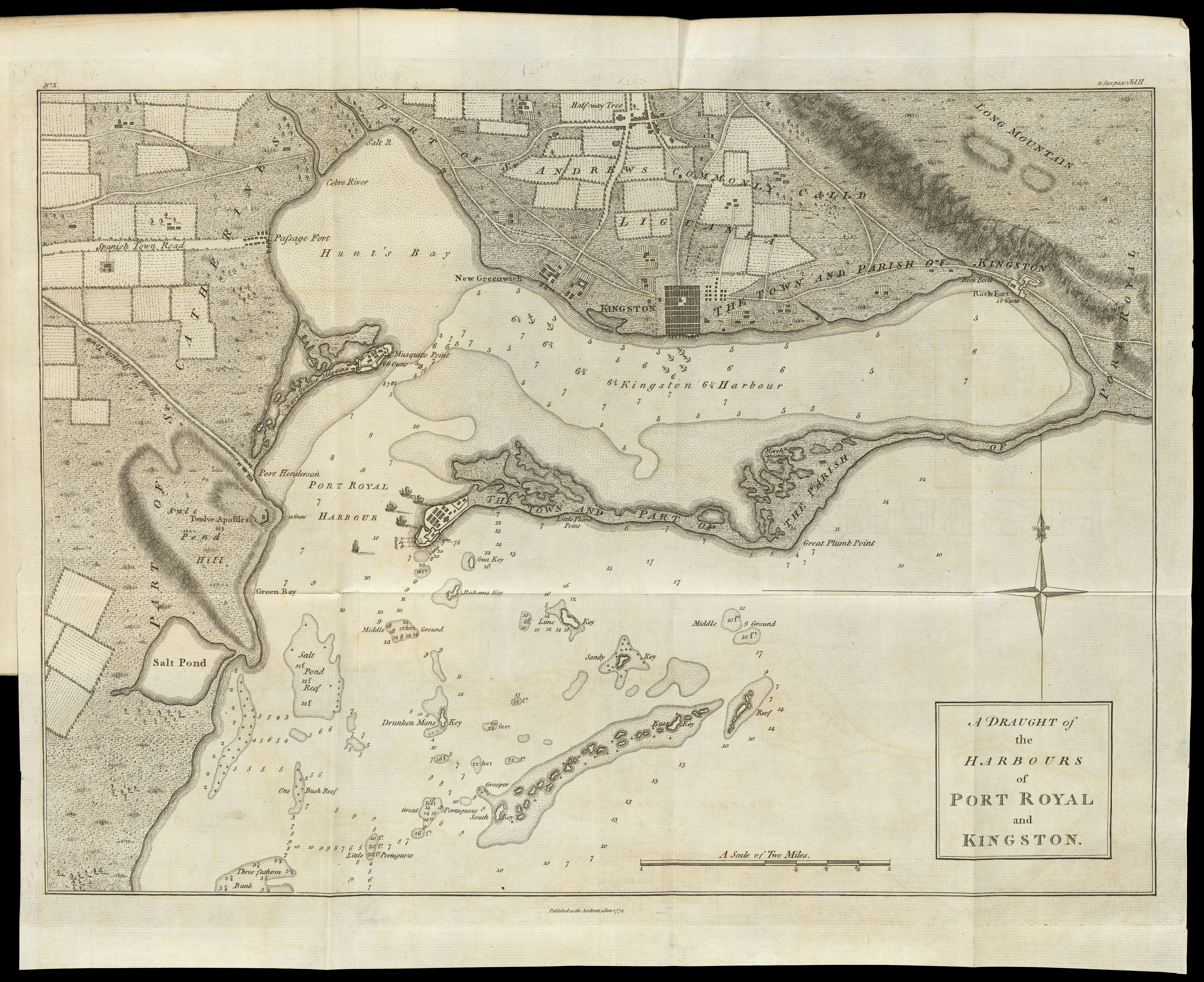
Lime Key on map of 1774

Located 15 - 30 minutes by boat from Port Royal. It has a small beach which makes it a popular location for recreation and sunbathing. It is a regular hotspot for post-party-goers, and during holiday season (Summer and Christmas) weekends the island is often swarmed with boats, music and socialites. Lime Cay measures 380 meters northwest-southeast, and is up to 80 meters wide, measuring 2 ha in area. About half of the area is wooded, the rest is sand and coral. It has no infrastructure except for a small open building used as a gazebo. The building is located at 17°55′06.36″N 76°49′11.96″W.
