= Dredge (disambiguation) =

Dredging is the excavation of material from a water environment.

Dredge or dredging may also refer to:

- Data dredging, the misuse of data analysis to find patterns in data
- Dredge (video game), a 2023 fishing game
- Dredge-up, any one of several stages in the evolution of some stars
- Bradley Dredge (born 1973), Welsh professional golfer
- Dredging (cooking), a cooking technique used to coat wet or moist foods with a dry ingredient prior to cooking
- Dredging Corporation of India, established 1976
- Fishing dredge, commercial fishing equipment towed along the bottom of the sea
- Marine biology dredge, scientific dredging equipment used to sample organisms living on the floor of the ocean

== See also ==
- Dredg, an American rock band
