= James Carnegie (pirate) =

Caribbean pirate

- Occupation: Pirate
- Known for: Sailing alongside Henry Jennings
- Piratical career
- Base of operations: Caribbean

James Carnegie (fl. 1716) was a pirate active in the Caribbean. He is best known for sailing alongside Henry Jennings.

== History ==
In March 1716 Henry Jennings, fresh from looting a Spanish treasure fleet which had wrecked the previous year, was granted a privateering commission from Governor Archibald Hamilton of Jamaica. Accompanying him would be fellow captains Samuel Liddell in the Cocoa Nut, Leigh Ashworth in the Mary, and James Carnegie in the sloop Discovery, plus future captain Charles Vane (as part of Jennings’ crew).

They planned on returning to the Spanish wrecks, but near Bahia Honda they spotted the French ship Marianne. Jennings proposed attacking it; Liddell objected since their commission was only against the Spanish. Their group was joined by Samuel Bellamy with his associate Paulsgrave Williams. Liddell was overruled, and Jennings and Ashworth took the ship. Carnegie held off initially but soon joined the others, while some of Liddell's crew left him in protest over his caution. Carnegie left the group to hunt down another fleeing French vessel, the Mary of Rochelle or Amiable Marie, which was itself stolen by Benjamin Hornigold and Olivier Levasseur. Carnegie returned to the fleet, which unsuccessfully chased Hornigold. Jennings gave Carnegie the captured ship, and in trade gave the French captain Carnegie's Discovery. Carnegie and Ashworth later had to intervene when the group's combined crews began arguing over division of spoils. Records do not indicate what happened to Carnegie afterwards.

== See also ==
- Nassau, Jennings' "home base" for piracy in the Caribbean.
