= Joseph Thompson (pirate) =

Caribbean pirate (d. 1719)

- Died: 1719
- Occupation: Pirate
- Known for: A single incident involving grenades
- Piratical career
- Base of operations: Caribbean
- Commands: Eagle

Joseph Thompson (died 1719) was a pirate from Trinidad, Cuba, (then part of New Spain) and was active in the Caribbean. He is primarily known for a single incident involving grenades.

== History ==
Thompson was among 209 pirates on New Providence who declared to Captain Vincent Pearse their intention to accept a 1718 offer of amnesty and pardon. Along with Charles Vane and a few others, he soon returned to piracy. After picking up additional crew for his sloop Eagle (some of whom had served with William Moody), he captured and looted several ships in the vicinity. In December 1718 in full view of Port Royal Thompson captured a ship called Kingston whose cargo was worth over £20,000. The ship's owners complained to Jamaican Governor Nicholas Lawes, but there were no Royal Navy warships available.

Instead Lawson issued commissions to two sloops in the harbor, promising them a share of the pirates' treasure in addition to the rewards guaranteed by King George's September 1717 proclamation to combat piracy. The two sloops sailed before year's end, encountering the pirate ship and another captured vessel. The pirate vessel under Captain Thompson raised a black flag and moved to attack.

Thompson's ship came alongside one of the pirate-hunters and "threw vast numbers of powder flasks, granado shells, and stinkpots into her which killed and wounded several, and made others jump overboard." The other pirate-hunter picked up the survivors, whose stories of the fight "so disheartned the men on board ye other vessell, the pyrate having a superior force, that they made the best of their way back to Port Royal." Thompson's 150-man crew, "banditti of all nations," marooned the remaining sailors on the Cayman Islands.

Jamaica's merchants pleaded again with Lawes to do something about Thompson. Lawes commissioned four more 10-gun, 80-man sloops with help from the merchants, and after refitting another in Port Royal plus the arrival of the fifth-rate frigate HMS Ludlow Castle, divided his forces to protect incoming merchants and hunt down Thompson. Four of the sloops soon cornered Thompson's ship, killing him and recovering the Kingston. Some of his surviving crew were captured to await trial in Bermuda, where they were found guilty and hanged in 1720.

== See also ==
- Fifth-rate, the ship class of HMS Ludlow Castle (which was itself scrapped in 1721).
