= Nicholas Brown (pirate) =

English pirate

- Born: England
- Died: 1726; Caribbean Sea, off the coast of Jamaica
- Piratical career
- Nickname: The Grand Pirate
- Type: Pirate, Guarda costa
- Allegiance: Spain
- Years active: 1721-1726
- Rank: Captain
- Base of operations: Caribbean Sea

Nicholas Brown (died 1726, first name also Nicolas) was an English pirate and guarda costa privateer who was active off the coast of Jamaica during the early 18th century.

== History ==
Brown was among a large group of pirates who accepted the 1717-1718 pardon offered to pirates by King George. (Note: Some sources (such as Colin Woodard) claim that Brown, like Christopher Winter, was present when the pardon was announced but left for Spanish service without accepting it.) Like several others, he soon returned to piracy, surrendering to the Spanish on Cuba before sailing in their service out of Trinidad. Governor Nicholas Laws of Jamaica wrote to Spanish magistrates in Trinidad in 1722 demanding “Satisfaction of you for so many notorious Robberies which your People have lately committed on the King's Subjects of this Island; particularly by those Traytors, Nicolas Brown and Christopher Winter, to whom you have given Protection.”

In 1723 he captured a British slave ship near Hispaniola with over 300 slaves aboard. He set the captain and crew adrift and brought the ship to Baracoa, Cuba. Brown paid another sailor to pretend to be the ship's captain so he could have Spanish officials in Baracoa condemn and sell the ship and slaves as a lawful prize.

He was finally caught and defeated in battle by pirate hunter and former schoolmate John Drudge in November 1726, dying of wounds sustained in the fight. Drudge had Brown's body decapitated and his head pickled in rum so he could collect the reward of £500 offered by the Jamaican government.

== See also ==
- John Auger
