= Nicholas Lawes =

British judge and colonial administrator

Sir Nicholas Lawes
- Born: 1652
- Died: 18 June 1731 (aged 78–79); Jamaica
- Occupation: Governor of Jamaica 1718–1722

Sir Nicholas Lawes (c. 1652 – 18 June 1731) was a British judge and colonial administrator who served as the governor of Jamaica from 1718 to 1722.

== Early life ==
Nicholas Lawes was born c. 1652 to Nicholas and Amy Lawes. He was a British knight.

== Governor of Jamaica ==
He was Chief Justice of Jamaica from 1698 to 1703 and Governor from 1718 to 1722.

In his capacity as Governor during the Golden Age of Piracy he hunted down or tried many pirates, among them John Massey, John Rackham, Anne Bonny, Mary Read, Robert Deal, Joseph Thompson, Nicholas Brown (with a reward paid to smuggler John Drudge for Brown's head), and Charles Vane. He signed an arrangement with Jeremy, king of the Miskito, to bring some of his followers over to Jamaica to hunt down runaway slaves and Jamaican Maroons in 1720. In 1706, he presented an engraved brass chandelier to St Andrew Parish Church, in Kingston, which still hangs in the church today.

== Family ==
Lawes married five widows in succession. No children survived from the first three marriages.

James and Temple Lawes were the sons of his fourth wife Susannah Temple whom he married in 1698. She had previously been married to Samuel Bernard. Her father, Thomas Temple, is said to have given Lawes his Temple Hall, Jamaica estate as a dowry.

Lawes later married Elizabeth Lawley (1690–1725), widow of Thomas Cotton, and daughter of Sir Thomas Lawley, 3rd Baronet and his first wife Rebecca Winch, daughter of Sir Humphrey Winch, 1st Baronet. Their youngest surviving daughter, Judith Maria Lawes, married Simon Luttrell, 1st Earl of Carhampton and so became Countess of Carhampton, both wife and mother of the Earls of Carhampton and also mother of Anne, Duchess of Cumberland and Strathearn who married Prince Henry, Duke of Cumberland and Strathearn, brother to King George III.

== Coffee and printing ==
At Temple Hall Lawes experimented with a variety of crops and introduced the very lucrative coffee growing into the island in 1721 according to some sources or 1728 according to others.

He is also credited with setting up the first printing press in Jamaica.

== Death ==
He died on 18 June 1731 in Jamaica.

Government offices
| Preceded by Peter Heywood | Governor of Jamaica; 1718–1722 | Succeeded by The Duke of Portland |
