= Henry Jennings =

British pirate (d. 1745?)

- Died: Unknown, possibly 1745
- Citizenship: British
- Occupations: Privateer-turned-pirate, ship captain, landowner
- Era: 1710s
- Employer: Kingdom of Great Britain
- Criminal status: Pardoned for piracy during general amnesty in 1718
- Piratical career
- Type: Privateer-turned-pirate
- Allegiance: Kingdom of Great Britain Republic of Pirates
- Years active: ?–1714 (Privateer) circa 1715–1718 (Piracy)
- Rank: Commodore
- Base of operations: Jamaica, followed by New Providence and Nassau in the Bahamas
- Commands: Sloop Bersheba
- Battles: War of Spanish Succession

Henry Jennings was an English privateer-turned-pirate. Jennings's first recorded act of piracy took place in early 1716 when, with three vessels and 150–300 men, Jennings's fleet ambushed the Spanish salvage camp from the 1715 Treasure Fleet. After the Florida raid, Jennings and his crew also linked up with Benjamin Hornigold's "three sets of pirates" from New Providence Island.

== Biography ==
=== Early life ===
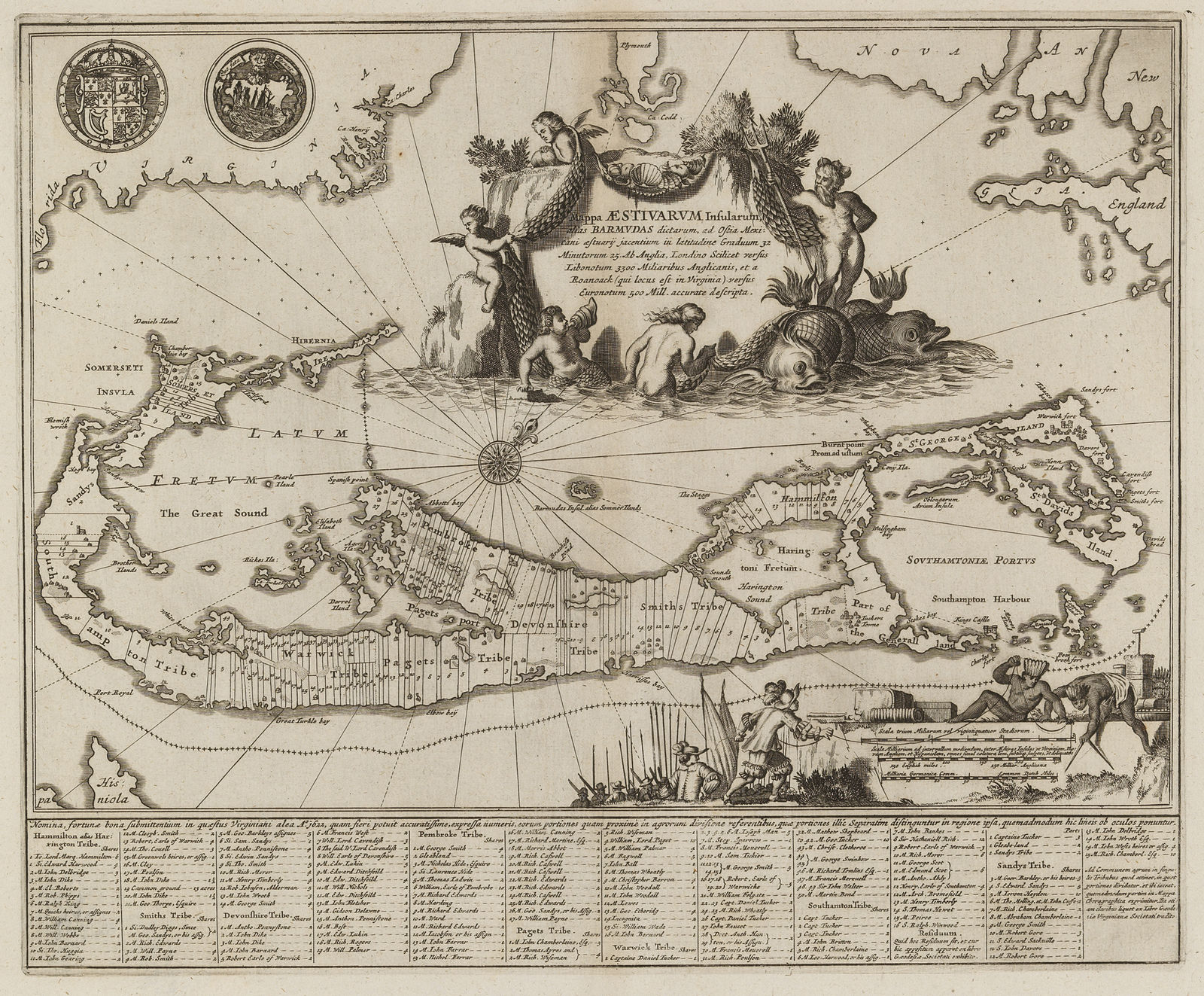
The map first published in 1622, from the 1616 to 1622 First Survey of the Somers Isles (alias Bermuda) by Richard Norwood, for the Company of the City of London for the Plantacion of The Somers Isles

Henry Jennings was the son of John Jennings, whose mother was the daughter of Perient and Mary Trott, she was also the sister of Perient Trott and Nicholas Trott, the later was the governor of Bahamas. Author Colin Woodard describes Jennings as "an educated ship captain with a comfortable estate" on Bermuda, and he had estates on both Bermuda, a colony inextricably linked with the history of privateering, and Jamaica. He described himself as a Bermudian, and the Jennings family was well established there, especially at Flatts Village (located along the southern shore of Flatt's Inlet, which gives access to Harrington Sound) in Hamilton Parish, the affluent neighbourhood in Smith's Parish to the immediate west of which is still known as Jennings' Land after Captain Richard Jennings (who was a member of the Council of Bermuda during and after the English Civil War).

=== Privateering from Jamaica ===
Although little is known of Jennings's early life, he was first recorded as a privateer during the 1701–1714 War of the Spanish Succession operating from Jamaica, then governed by Lord Archibald Hamilton.

=== Plate Fleet raids of November 1715 ===
On 31 July 1715, all 11 vessels of the 1715 Treasure Fleet, a large Spanish treasure fleet heading out from Havana, wrecked in a hurricane along the coasts of Florida near Cape Canaveral. News of the wreck and their distress call reached Jamaica in November 1715, and Jennings and his ship Bersheba sailed immediately to the Florida coast. Jennings and the Bersheba had been granted a commission by the governor of Jamaica, Lord Archibald Hamilton, as had John Wills' Eagle. They had been sanctioned to "Execute all manner of Acts of Hostility against pyrates according to the Law of Arms," with explicit instructions not to attack anyone except pirates. History Today states that it was later claimed that Hamilton had invested in the ships and endorsed a plan for them to attack the Spanish wrecks as well. Hamilton would later deny involvement in the upcoming attacks on Spanish wrecks. In December, Jennings and Charles Vane captured a Spanish mail ship and got the exact position of the main Spanish salvage camp and Urca de Lima from her captain Pedro de la Vega.

By the time Jennings arrived in Florida in early 1716, most of the treasure from the 1715 Treasure Fleet had already been returned to Havana after collection by Indian divers. However, Jennings found the rest awaiting shipment on the beach in a lightly guarded fort at Palma de Ayz, possibly close to Vero Beach. Jennings's first recorded act of piracy took place when, with three vessels and 150–300 men, his fleet ambushed the Spanish salvage camp. The nucleus of the pirate force was a group of English ex-privateers: Jennings, Charles Vane (on the Bersheba), Samuel Bellamy, Benjamin Hornigold, and Edward England. When Jennings and his men raided the storehouses, they forced the retreat of around 60 soldiers with superior numbers of 300 privateers, stealing about £87,500 in gold and silver, equivalent to a ten-year salary.

=== Dividing spoils in Nassau, return to Jamaica ===
The New Providence capital of Nassau by 1715 was the former capital of the collapsed Bahamian government. By the end of 1715, Jennings arrived in Nassau with £87,000 in recovered Spanish treasure, as the city was experiencing an expansion. According to Connor, shortly after arriving in Nassau, Jennings took a small Spanish trading sloop from Hornigold. As Jennings had 200 "well-armed" men under his command and at least two sloops, Hornigold was unable to stop him, with some of Jennings's men moving aboard the taken sloop to relieve crowding on the others. The flotilla left for Jamaica "after a few days of revelry and the orderly distribution of the crew's portion of the prize money." Jennings and his men then sailed for Jamaica to present their prizes to the Vice-Admiralty Court, which was presided over by Hamilton.

Jennings set sail for Jamaica carrying back an estimated 350,000 peso, or 120,000 pieces of eight, accompanied by fellow Captain John Wills and his crew of the Eagle. On the way his fleet encountered a Spanish merchant ship, which Jennings's captured and plundered. Afterwards he released the crew on their ship, which he did not sink. The Spanish captain followed Jennings's fleet back to Jamaica, and following it up the Cuban shore through Windward Passage and to the mouth of Port Royal Harbor. The Spanish captain then sailed to Cuba, and reported the plundering of his ship to the Spanish viceroy. As a result, the viceroy, who had also heard of Jennings's pillaging the shore camp, was "outraged," and contacted Hamilton to demand the pirates be hanged. The viceroy also threatened to kill Englishmen in locales such as Havana if Hamilton did not comply. With Hamilton stating he knew nothing of such pirates and there must have been a mistake, said he would, in turn, flog any Spanish he could find in Jamaica if the threat to English lives was carried out. The Barsheba dropped anchor in Jamaica on 26 January 1716. Jennings and Willis, in accordance with their commissions, brought their treasure to Hamilton. Although Hamilton later stated he did not take his share of the treasure, as "I heard it was taken from the shore", he did not arrest Jennings either, nor other privateers.

=== Jamaica and pillaging in early 1716 ===
History Today related that "Jennings and Wills' arrival with their illicitly acquired fortune created a sensation in Jamaica," with many other privateers and pirates sailing to Florida to seek treasure from the wrecks along what would become known as the Treasure Coast. In Jamaica, "Jennings and his pirates were the toast of the town, not only for their daring attack but also for the many looted supplies they brought for sale to anyone with money." However, Hamilton complained to the local merchants about possible conflict with the Spanish over the pirates, who in turn advised Jennings to quietly leave Jamaica. Jennings sold the rest of his booty, and prepared to leave with his men. Shortly after leaving Jamaica, Jennings and his men overtook and plundered a Jamaican merchant vessel of Englishmen, stripping valuables down to the captain's clothing. The merchant ship sailed back to Jamaica and told of the incident, where Jennings was described as a pirate for preying on both English and Spanish ships. Around this time, a Spanish squadron of ships sent to capture Jennings instead burned the boats of several Englishmen on an island, while the Englishmen were ashore chopping wood. Jennings came across the moored men several days later, and offered to allow them to join his fleet, which they took him up on. The woodcutters were then put on the next ship captured for Jennings's fleet, with the ship also manned with some of Jennings's own crew. As his fleet and his fame grew, his fleet became too large and needed to be split into two groups.

Jennings attacked the Spanish wrecks again in January 1716 with the Bathsheba. He again went after a warehouse of salvaged Spanish treasure. The leader of the Spanish salvagers offered Jennings 25,000 pieces of eight to leave them alone, and while Jennings took the offering, he also continued pillaging the outmanned Spaniards, taking even their personal possessions and some of their Spanish cannons before sailing away.

=== More time in Jamaica, March 1716 ===
Jennings and the crews remained in Jamaica until the end of February. At that time, when Jennings came to Hamilton about permission for a new cruise, Hamilton signed his departure papers personally, also signing another commission for Jennings. In early March 1716, Jennings sent word to fellow captains and his men that he would be making a new cruise to the Spanish wrecks. Of the responders, Leigh Ashworth assumed command of the sloop-of-war Mary, another of Hamilton's privateers. Two others, Samuel Liddell of the Cocoa Nut and James Carnegie of the Discovery, joined with their small sloops without commission, accepting Jennings’s overall command. Charles Vane also rejoined Jennings's crew.

When Jennings sailed with the Bersheba to the wrecks this third time, he was under direct orders of Daniel De Costa Alvarenga, a Jewish merchant from Kingston who was the new owner of the sloop. Hamilton tried to stop the Bersheba from sailing on this trip, but was ignored as it had official clearance.

=== French ship raids in 1716 ===
==== Departure and first captures in April ====
Jennings in April 1716 set out from Bluefield's Bay in Jamaica in his sloop Bersheba, along with a fleet of ships. His intention was to fish the Spanish wrecks, moving up from the Isle of Pines to Florida. They left Bluefields on the morning of 9 March, regrouping a few days later at Isla de los Pinos near Cuba. They rounded Cape Corrientes on 2 April. The following day, off the coast of Cuba, Bersheba spotted Samuel Bellamy and Paulsgrave Williams, who were looting a ship. The two pirate captains and their crews abandoned ship upon the sight of Jennings's four sloops British colors, fleeing sailing canoes. Captain Young, of the ship being attacked by Bellamy, expected Jennings to rescue him, but Jennings instead commandeered the ship and began moving it into bay to decide what to do with it. In that process, his fleet encountered a large armed merchant ship flying French colors in a harbor, named the St. Marie. He dropped anchor with his flotilla of five ships out of sight and sent several men in to hail the French ship to assess what was on board. Jennings’s, meeting with the other captains, declared he would attack at night so the Bersheba would not be sunk in a direct attack. Only Liddell voted against the attack, arguing it was piracy, as the St. Marie was a legal vessel. He was outvoted, with 23 of his crew joining Jennings's forces for the attack as well.

That evening, Bellamy and Williams hailed Jennings, meeting him for the first time and joining the force preparing for the sneak attack. After the successful attack, on 4 April 1716, Jennings questioned the French crew. The French captain later reported that Jennings's crew "tormented" the French crew, forcing them to reveal where they had hidden 30,000 pieces of eight onshore. Jennings kept the St. Marie and appointed Carnegie the captain, giving the French captain Carnegie's Discovery instead. Furthermore, Jennings forced the French captain to write a letter to Hamilton, absolving the attackers of wrongdoing.

==== Capture of the Marianne and Mary ====
A sailing canoe later approached the St. Marie to trade while the crew was dividing spoils, and Jennings's then "inflicted punishments" on the new captives to locate their larger vessel. When he went off to find the Marianne, he found that Hornigold had already commandeered the ship. Jennings set sail afterwards, ordering all vessels to chase Hornigold down. The crew of the newly captured St. Marie, however, lagged behind the other ships, and the rest of the fleet was out of sight by the time they weighed anchor. Jennings, failing to capture Hornigold, returned to the bay several hours later with the Barsheba and Mary, to discover that Bellamy and Williams had surprised Jennings's prize crew and the French prisoners to take control of the St. Marie at gunpoint. They had then rowed off in the wind with 28,500 pieces of eight.

Jennings arrived to find Bellamy sailing away, and although he fruitlessly gave chase, he gave up and returned to the St. Marie to find the valuables taken. As a reward for betraying Jennings, Hornigold gave Bellamy the Marianne, although Blackbeard had expected to be given that command himself.

Jennings was furious at the loss of the valuables on the St. Marie. He had the second of Bellamy's periaguas seized and "cut to pieces," presumably with the remainder of Bellamy's men onboard. He also ordered Captain Young's sloop burnt to the waterline. Afterwards, he ordered his fleet sail to Nassau to divide the remaining spoils.

When Bellamy double-crossed Jennings, Jennings's ruthlessness was evidenced in the brutal slaying of more than 20 Frenchmen and Englishmen, and the burning of an innocent Englishman's merchant sloop.

In April 1716, he captured the French vessel Marianne. During the attack, he fired the Bersheba's great gun himself, easily taking the ship. At this time he encountered Benjamin Hornigold in the Benjamin attempting to join in the plunder of the Marianne. Jennings harshly rebuffed Hornigold for interfering in his "official" operation, so Hornigold and other ships involved in the raid afterwards attacked other French ships instead.

==== Capture of Hornigold's ship and Nassau ====
After the raid on the Marianne, Jennings, Ashworth, and another captain set sail for New Providence, an island in the Bahamas and former capital of the collapsed Bahamian government. On the way to New Providence, Jennings chased down Hornigold to secure the treasure from the Mary, a ship Hornigold had just captured.

Reaching New Providence about 22 April 1716, Jennings used the island as a base to split the French spoils. According to Jennings's quartermaster, there was some dispute on how the spoils were distributed among the men. After some of the men began to take spoils on their initiative, Jennings split the French spoils three ways: one third for the men, and one third each for sloop owners Daniel Axtell and Jasper Ashworth (brother of Leigh Ashworth). According to a deposition based on an eyewitness, when Jennings arrived in Providence he "bought in as prize a French ship [Marianne] mounted with 32 guns which he had taken at the Bay of Hounds [Bahia Honda], and there shared the cargo (which was very rich consisting of European goods for the Spanish trade) amongst his men, and then went in the said ship to the [Florida wrecks] where he served as Commodore and guardship."

=== Expulsion from Jamaica in 1716 ===
Jennings continued to sail for the wrecks in Florida after his raids on the French, stopping ships such as Spanish mailboats along the way. In April 1716, the Spanish salvagers had left the site of Jennings's first two attacks, and Jennings returned again to the site, this time leading efforts to recover more sunken treasure. After political pressure, Hamilton issued proclamations in April 1716 forbidding all commissioned vessels in Jamaica from fishing the Florida wrecks for plunder. It was one of his last acts as governor before Hamilton was himself arrested, and overall he declared all passes issued to treasure hunters null and void, meaning that henceforth, any captain attacking Spanish forts or vessels in peacetime was a pirate. On his third trip to the wrecks, Jennings intercepted a Spanish vessel as it returned from the salvage site, and reappeared off Port Royal with 30,000 pieces of eight he had forcibly taken from the Spanish vessel. Hamilton made it clear that Jennings would be arrested if the Bersheba entered Kingston harbor, and the sloop and the cargo impounded. Jennings and his crew chose to sail away with their cargo.

=== Pirate Republic of Nassau ===
==== Pirate governor of New Providence, 1716 ====
Declared a pirate by Lord Archibald Hamilton, Jennings could not return to Jamaica, and so he established Nassau as his base for further raids on Spanish wrecks. Also evicted from the mainland of Jamaica, many pirates followed Jennings's example and headed for New Providence. Nassau's pirate population grew from dozens to hundreds after the Florida shipwreck raids, and by early 1716, the governor of Bermuda stated that there were over 1,000 pirates in Nassau and that they outnumbered the mere hundred of inhabitants in the town. Jennings became an unofficial mayor of the growing pirate colony in Nassau, or the Republic of Pirates, and author Johnson-Mist would later describe him as "Captain Jennings, who was [the Nassau pirates'] Commodore, and who always bore a great Sway among them, being a Man of good Understanding, and good Estate, before this Whim took him of going a Pyrating." The Republic of Pirates was dominated by Hornigold and Jennings, both famous pirates who were bitter rivals. At the start of 1716, Hornigold had proposed that he would lead the pirates of the Nassau Pirate Republic, with the pirates choosing the moniker "Flying Gang." With Hornigold mentor to pirates such as Edward "Blackbeard" Teach, Samuel Bellamy, and Stede Bonnet. Despite their rivalries, the pirates worked together through the "Flying Gang" and quickly became infamous for their exploits. However, Nassau eye-witness John Vickers was not referring to Jennings or other Jamaican privateers as part of the Flying Gang by the summer of 1716.

==== Capture of Hamilton's ship, late 1716 ====
Hamilton was arrested in October 1716 for the crime of violating treaties with the Spaniards, and he left Jamaica on about 22 September to England, accompanied by a fleet of seventeen ships. The ships were afterwards separated by wind. On the journey in November 1716, the governor’s ship, Hamilton Galley with Captain Stone, was captured by Jennings with 134 men. They kept Stone for four days, but were recorded as having taken only twenty gallons of rum. Stone later related that his captors "treated him civil, & told him they hurt no English Men." Hamilton afterwards transferred to HMS Bedford for the remainder of the journey. The day after Stone was captured, another pirate tried to take Jennings, but he subdued the attempt. In December 1716, Jennings had his spoils transferred in Kingston. Details of Jennings life from this time have been reconstructed from the depositions of Peter Heywood, who became the new acting governor of Jamaica as Hamilton was removed.

=== Pardon in 1718 and retirement ===
The newly appointed Governor of the Bahamas, Woodes Rogers, issued a royal decree on 5 September 1717, which pardoned all pirates who surrendered within the year. In particular, the king's pardon allowed outlaws in the Bahamas to seek relief from British Authorities through a general amnesty declared. In early 1718, Jennings sailed to Bermuda to turn himself in, surrendering to authorities and accepting the reprieve. He was one of 400 pirates who took advantage of the amnesty, and, after serving as a privateer in the War of the Quadruple Alliance, retired to Bermuda to live the rest of his life "as a wealthy, respected member of society."

It is unknown what his ultimate fate was: some sources claim he retired as a wealthy plantation owner in Bermuda, some historians speculate that he was captured by the Spaniards in his later years, dying in obscurity in a New Spanish prison, and other legends have him growing old with his family in Bermuda. He is not listed on the 1727 property tax assessment of Bermuda despite the presence of other Jennings there. Various men named "Henry Jennings" populate Bermuda's history; however, the former pirate Captain Henry Jennings was likely the one killed or captured by the French or Spanish while operating as a privateer during the War of Jenkins' Ear and the War of the Austrian Succession. The Pennsylvania Gazette of July 4, 1745, reported: "They had advice in Bermuda of the loss of 7 of their sloops ... taken in different parts of the West-Indies within a few months past, commanded by the following Captains, viz., Henry Jennings, ..."

== See also ==
- Samuel Bellamy
- 1715 in piracy
- List of pirates
- History of the Bahamas
