= Leigh Ashworth =

Pirate and privateer

- Years active: 1716-1719
- Piratical career
- Commands: Mary

Leigh Ashworth (fl. 1716-1719) was a pirate and privateer operating in the Caribbean in the early 1700s.

== History ==
Leigh Ashworth was captain of a sloop named Mary, originally outfitted for privateering with a commission from Jamaican governor Lord Archibald Hamilton. Alongside Henry Jennings, James Carnegie, and Samuel Liddell, they took a pair of French vessels in early 1716 in the Bay of Hounds. They also had to chase down Benjamin Hornigold, who'd made off with one of the French ships shortly afterwards.

This caused a dispute with French officials in the area, who protested that the English ships were effectively pirates. In Jamaica Ashworth's quartermaster Joseph Eels was arrested, and on the testimony of Eels and others – given in exchange for a promise of avoiding prosecution - the Mary was seized by the authorities in Jamaica in 1716 on suspicion of piracy. His brother Jasper and his partner Daniel Axtell were also arrested, having acted as fences for Ashworth's stolen goods. The ill-equipped local government declared that they had uncertain authority to deal with the situation: "what to do with these men, we know not as yett, not having a Commission … nor Admiral, Vice Admiral or a deputy".

When a general amnesty was offered in 1718 to pirates who gave up their ways, Ashworth, Jennings, Hornigold, and over 200 others accepted. Ashworth next spent time ferrying ships and goods back and forth from South Carolina to Jamaica, encountering Blackbeard.

Late that year, Ashworth accepted another privateering commission against the Spanish and French. He was still attacking ships on flimsy pretenses: a former pirate operating a sloop out of New Providence testified that Ashworth "pretended to take him for a Spaniard" because his ship Endeavour had formerly been a Spanish sloop. Ashworth was still privateering as of 1719 but there are few records of his activities beyond that point, though his brother Jasper Ashworth settled near Port Royal, married, and became a regional official.

== See also ==
- Woodes Rogers - Governor of the Bahamas who offered the 1718 general pardon to surrendering pirates.
