= Miguel Enríquez's corsair fleet =

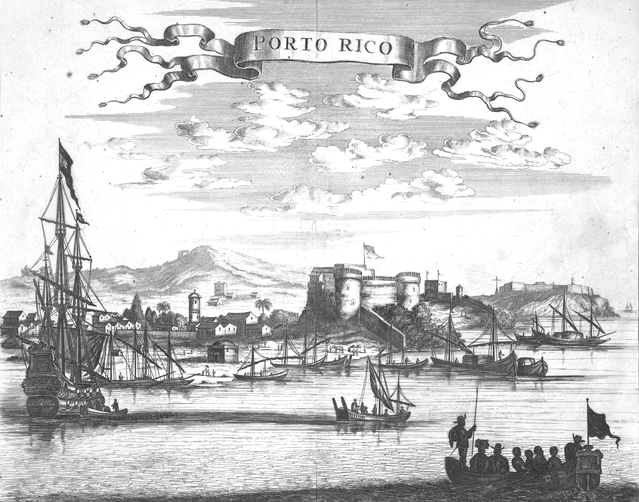
San Juan Bay during the Golden Age of Piracy, before Castillo San Felipe del Morro was completed.

On his way to becoming a self-made military Captain and Knight of the Royal Effigy within the Spanish Empire, Miguel Enríquez assembled a fleet of privately owned vessels that he staffed and sanctioned with letters of marque. During a career that spanned almost three decades, he commanded over 300 privateer ships and 1,500 corsair sailors, which at an average of two captures per vessel were responsible for more than 600 prizes.

The fleet also participated in military campaigns and provided support and transport for imperial officers and clergy. Corsairs from Puerto Rico were often called guarda costas, or "coast guards". They operated in the same fashion as any other pirate, the only difference was that they did it in the name of Spain, protecting imperial trade restrictions. Enríquez favored small to medium crafts, with his fleet being mostly composed of sloops, schooners and brigantines, despite capturing numerous larger vessels such as frigates. This responded to the maneuverability of these models, which were used to intercept and board foreign ships using tactics that mirrored those employed by the buccaneers and other freebooters that plagued the Atlantic shipping lines. At the time, the efficiency of the corsair fleet was said to be superior to that of the formal military entity tasked with protecting the Spanish West Indies, the Armada de Barlovento, and on occasion worked in unison on certain missions.

Enríquez's fleet first gained notoriety for pursuing smugglers and hunting foreign pirates in the waters that surround Puerto Rico during the height of the Golden Age of Piracy, making the region relatively safe despite the ongoing explosion of high seas crime throughout the Caribbean, for which he was commended by king Phillip of Spain. Between 1702 and 1713 it was composed by more than thirty vessels, of which at least a dozen was lost, which were responsible for capturing more than twenty prizes. As a shrewd businessman, the privateer often exploited legal loopholes to sell the loot as "corsair goods", a practice that enabled him to became the most wealthy citizen of the island even outclassing the government's treasury. Between 1716 and 1733, his ships captured over 176 slaves from ships boarded, which were incorporated into the Spanish market.

The fleet was responsible for driving settlers from Anguilla out of the neighboring island of Vieques and capturing 56 British-flagged merchantmen, earning the corsair a reputation as a pirate among the British who also bestowed upon him the nickname of "The Grand Archvillain". The ultimate fate of the fleet was sealed when colonial governor Matías de Abadía sided with several aristocratic families of San Juan, stripping Enríquez of his political and economic power and influence, confiscating his assets and driving him to seek asylum with the Catholic Church.

== History ==
=== Beginning, modus operandi (1702-1705) ===
Vessels

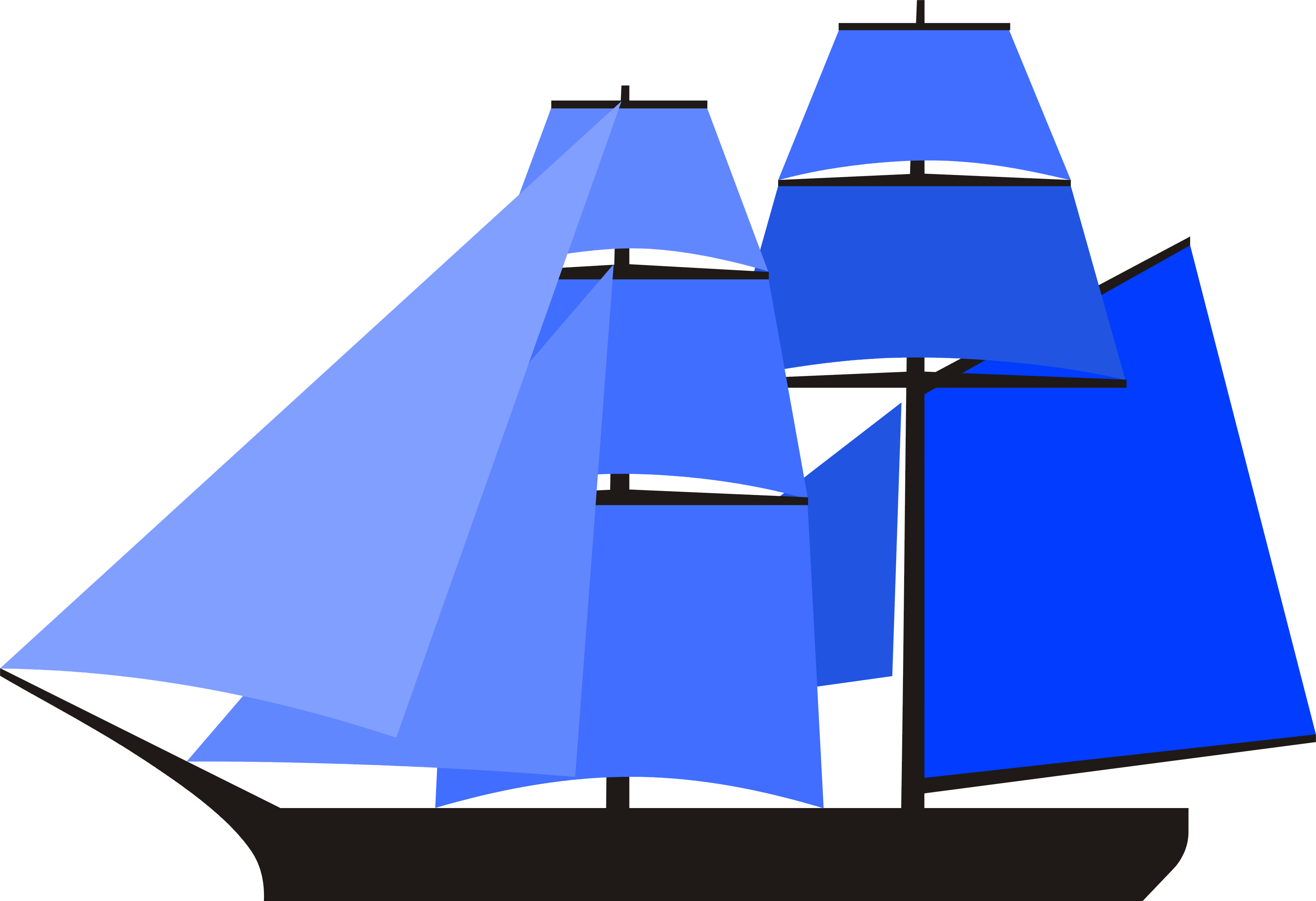
Brigantine

Schooner

Sloop

The different types of sail ship commonly used by the corsair fleet. All of which favored speed and maneuverability.

Early in his career, Enríquez operated only two vessels at once, often replacing those lost. Among those, several were captured by foreign countries including seven sloops, a schooner and a brigantine. Dutch colonial authorities from Curaçao caught the sloops San Nicolás, Santa Bárbara and La María (with British help), along an unnamed schooner. The ship known as Popa Azul was captured off the coast of Puerto Rico by the Dutch States Navy. An unnamed sloop was captured by the Royal Navy near Santa Cruz, following three days of conflict. Others, including a brigantine, were lost due to other causes. Enríquez usually kept his fleet well staffed, with these vessels being manned by 100–200 sailors. Due to the fact that privateers were not required to report the names of the ships captured to sell their loot, few of the fleet's victims are known by designation. However, it is known that he captured an average of two victims for every vessel lost. The most successful was La Modista, which captured a total of 95 enslaved Africans from British and Danish slave ships which were delivered directly to Enríquez.

One of his ships named Santo Tomás was involved in a controversy when its captain, José Rodríguez, ordered his crew to board a Spanish sloop that was leaving the Danish port of St. Thomas. Rodríguez tried to justify his action by stating that the vessel was leaving a foreign harbor and could be carrying contraband, but was still jailed in Santo Domingo for some time. Santo Tomás had actually left Puerto Rico ordered to attend the frequent contraband arriving from that island, only receiving a mild authorization from Enríquez, who was sick and decided not to protest the will of the establishment. Not opposing the governor would prove to be a mistake, since the audience that discussed the case decided to place all the blame on him and Rodríguez. From this moment forward, Enríquez changed his approach, portraying himself as a loyal subject and offering his resources without question, if only to play the circumstances to his favor. On December 12, 1704, the Spanish Crown authorized the establishment of a route between Puerto Rico and the Canary Islands, which would carry 150 tons of fruit. However, this route remained stale for two years. The government did not possess such a ship and was forced to ask Enríquez to loan it one of his. He did not oppose the request and the vessel arrived to Gran Canaria, with the merchandise having survived a storm and a rough voyage. Enríquez continued to operate this route, repeating the action a year later. However, the Council of the Indies suspended it, claiming that no ship smaller than 50 or 60 tons should travel between Puerto Rico and the Canary Islands due to strategic considerations. In 1707, Enríquez issued a letter to the King ofSpain stating that he had placed two vessels near the Leeward and Windward Islands to guard their coasts. He also emphasized his loss of six other ships in battles against opposition from Jamaica and Curaçao.

=== The Danío Granados and De Rivera administrations (1706-1714) ===
After he arrived to Puerto Rico to take the office of governor, Francisco Danío Granados quickly entered into a partnership with the privateer. The career military Captain ordered the construction of a brigantine and registered the vessel under both of their names. However, the ship was captured and Enríquez was forced to use his own money to recover it, once again registering it under both names. A vessel named La Aurora was registered in a similar fashion and the earnings of its three voyages were divided equitably. Other sloops, including San Miguel and Los Montes, served a similar purpose. Enríquez also bought a sloop in Cádiz for the sole purpose of transporting the governor's nephew, Jacome Danío. From that moment onwards, the fleet would be dispatched without question for any purpose that the functionary requested, as a form of quid pro quo. Among the missions issued by Danío, Enríquez sent ships to guard the local coasts and capture contrabandists. They also served the Crown in other assignments, such as providing transport to stranded Jesuit priests.

Juan de Ribera's assignment to the colonial governorship in 1709 led to a direct power struggle between the establishment and Enríquez. Unable to directly confiscate the fleet due to the Royal Auxiliary Identification Document that had been granted to the privateer, the functionary opted to employ indirect tactics to drive him off business. Towards these ends, De Ribera forced Enríquez to provide his employees and resources for free. The governor exploited this to create his own parallel fleet, with the intention of completely overtaking the privateering venture. De Ribera also made sure that Enríquez's fleet was constantly occupied in menial or redundant tasks, requesting their service 19 times. The authorities also seized the best ship of the lot, La Gloria, never paying the sum that it was worth. Undettered, Enríquez built a brigantine to add to the fleet in his own shipyard in 1710. This dockyard was also used to repair other vessels, especially those that belonged to the Crown. During this timeframe, Enríquez's fleet also included La María, San José, La Gloria, La Perla, San Antonio, Los Montes, Nuestra Señora del Rosario and El Jenízaro. He frequently recycled these names for other vessels. Of them, La Aurora was the first known to operate outside the Caribbean, capturing El Príncipe de Asturias off the coast of New England in 1712. Despite the fact that Enríquez worked under a Spanish letter of marque, La Aurora was actually flying a British flag and operating under forged documents, selling its loot at Guadalupe. Two years earlier, Enríquez had ordered his ships to stalk this British colony. On April 6, 1710, Danío requested that one of Enríquez's ships was used to transport important documents to Spain. The sloop La Perla was chosen for this task, carrying some loot gathered through privateering and also ferrying five prisoners that had been sentenced to death. The vessel docked and immediately received a license to sell the unregistered merchandise, earning a second license that allowed it to import European merchandise in its return voyage.

Another form of physiological warfare employed by the governor was keeping the fleet perpetually docked with the constant denial of privateering licenses and the frequent ruling that its captures were "not fair game". Only five licenses were granted and Ribera also confiscated the entire profit of legitimate privateering incursions, citing that the loot belonged to the Crown due to his personal authorization. This inactivity concluded with several of Enríquez's men deserting and becoming pirates, only to return days after to antagonize the governor. These pirates also boarded one of his former employer's privateering sloops. The conclusion of the War of Succession complicated matters more, since French men were now forbidden from working as corsairs for Spain. This meant that a large portion of the sailors working for Enríquez's fleet were expelled. Despite the multiple obstacles, Enríquez's fleet captured six British victims and nine ships belonging to the Netherlands between 1709 and 1714. Besides assaulting the enemies of Spain, they also seized five vessels from the adjacent Virgin Islands. The loot acquired included clothes, food and money. In 1714, San Miguel captured a British frigate off Philadelphia and brought it to San Juan.

=== Expansion and operations during the War of the Quadruple Alliance (1716-1720) ===
In 1716, after months of reorganization that required contracting a new crew, Enríquez was able to command two small vessels (a sloop and a schooner), to resume his privateering venture. These ships were lost shortly afterwards, resetting the process. Enríquez decided to purchase four sloops, naming them El Águila, La Perla, La Aurora and El Fénix. His fleet was systematically restored, with the further acquisition of El Delfín, La Modista, La Pequeña Aurora and Nuestra Señora de Altagracia, Nuestra Señora del Rosario and San Miguel y las Animas. The rebuilding phase extended for a period of three years, and it experienced the loss of La Perla. Once it was concluded, Enríquez's fleet was stronger than its original incarnation. He now employed around 300 sailors and requested military supervision to control them. The fleet captured eight Danish vessels named La Margarita, La Juana, Neptuno, Vliegende, Leeduyuel, Leojane and Brelot. Saint Thomas's governor complained to interim governor Adalberto Bertolano (in office since 1716), noting that they were being captured despite the fact that both nations were not at war. This claim was dismissed, citing that no foreign ship was allowed to fish near Puerto Rico.

Throughout the years, Enríquez remained mostly focused in his role as a merchant, exploiting this distinction to move legal and smuggled products with success. He could easily use his privateering ships to launder goods that were otherwise illegal, investing the saving in land and properties. On occasion, he even received permission to openly import illegal merchandise. He used these exceptions to compensate for materials that were lacking in Puerto Rico. His enemies tried to expose him, but with little success. In 1718, they testified that Enríquez had smuggled clothes and other items hidden aboard the sloop La Gloria. Led by Pozo, the group launched another defamatory campaign against him. The attorney of San Juan even blamed him for a shortage of food, after he attempted to export 700 units of merchandise citing that the market was oversaturated. Due to this action the food was retained at port and spoiled. As a consequence, Enríquez deduced that for the well-being of his business, the best was to move and sell the merchandise as far away as possible. His sloops were sent in long voyages, with the incursions of La Aurora and El Águila lasting periods of nearly two years and nine months respectively. They operated and moved merchandise between Habana, Santiago and Cartagena. These ships were likely buying and selling contraband by veiling it as products captured by privateering. Upon returning to San Juan, both of these vessels arrived without any privateering spoils.

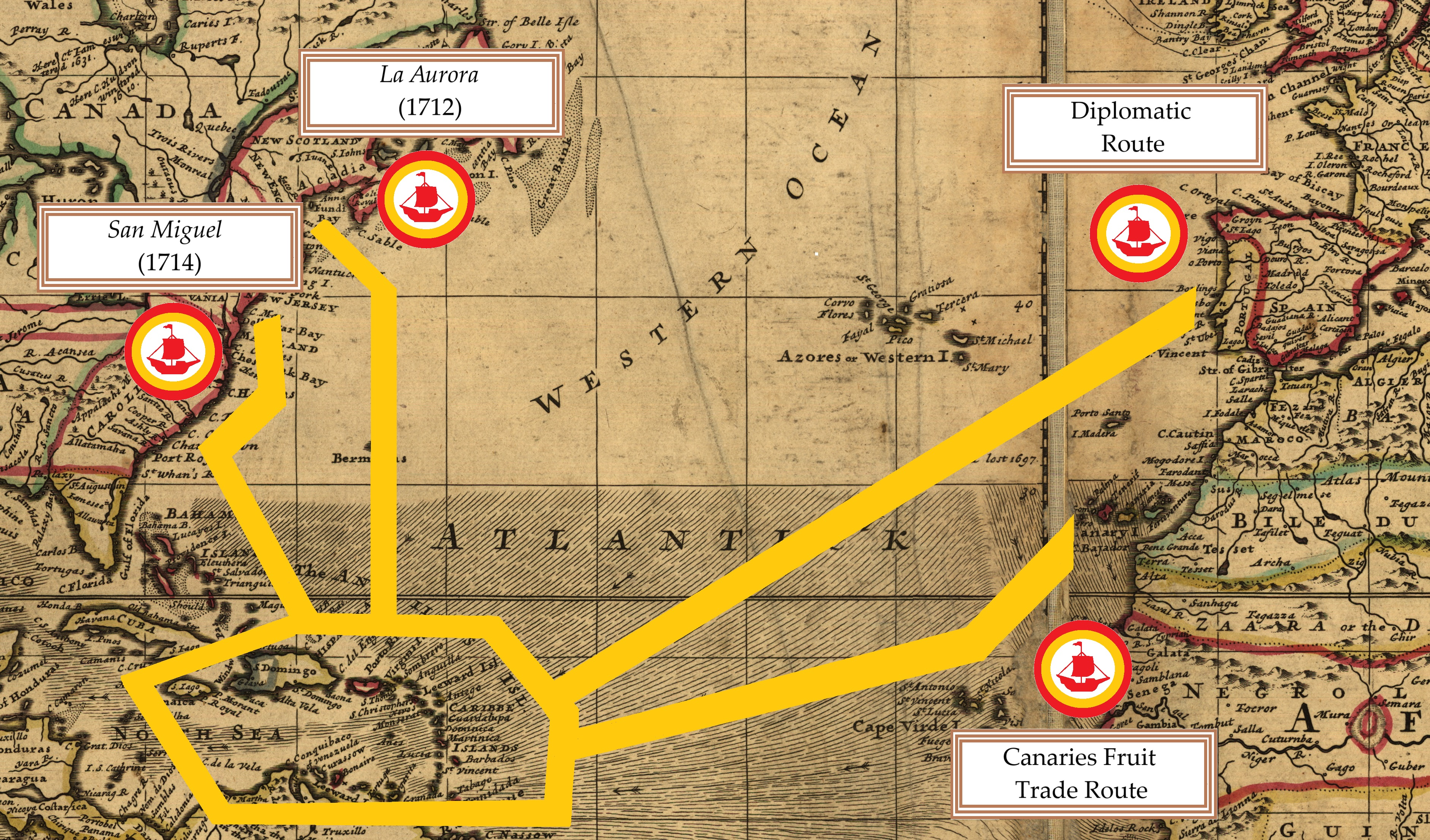
Map showing the fleet's range of operations

In 1718, one of the fleet's vessels was captured by a Danish corsair operating out of Saint Thomas. Due to this incident, the crew learned that British colonists from Anguilla were settling on the island of Vieques. Bertolano ordered Enríquez to send someone to verify the veracity of this rumor. He equipped two ships with military supplies and departed for Vieques. The crew confirmed the information and set sail to San Juan. During its return, the ships located a small boat with seven black men, which they captured and took to San Juan. The group was fleeing from Saint Thomas to Puerto Rico pursuing Catholic baptism and protested their capture, but Enríquez ignored their plights and keep them as slaves. He convinced the governor to list them as "privateering goods" despite the circumstances not falling under the stipulations of the letter of marque. This also ignored royal decrees that allowed any foreign slave who arrived in Puerto Rico pursuing a conversion to Catholicism the opportunity to become a free man. Colonial Treasurer José del Pozo Oneto opposed this move, managing to revoke the governor's original ruling.

Shortly afterwards, a vessel property of the Armada de Barlovento arrived to San Juan. Bertolano told its commander, General José Roche de la Peña, about the situation in Vieques. The governor decided to organize a mini-armada of five vessels. Only one belonged to the Crown, the others were private. Enríquez loaned the sloop La Perla, which Roche commanded. A makeshift crew composed by privateers, members of the Puerto Rican urban militias and soldiers was assembled. Once it had arrived at Vieques, the Spanish forces attacked and overwhelmed the British settlers, only suffering a single loss while 30 colonists were killed and 59 others were made prisoners of war. Afterwards, the fledgling settlement was burned to the ground. After successfully expelling the British from Vieques, La Perla intercepted a British ship traveling from Bermuda, capturing 72 slaves. Enríquez asked to list them as privateering goods instead of war spoils, but this was denied since La Perla had been supplied with public money. The Crown scolded him for his actions during this event. Besides his active participation, Enríquez also took the initiative of rebuilding the San José fort, undertaking most of the project's cost.

Of the four British vessels captured by the fleet after that nation joined an alliance and declared war on Spain in 1719, La Modista claimed three. Most were captured in a reconnaissance mission, however, their delivery was complicated by the arrival of a British privateer. La Modista won the ensuing naval exchange and returned to San Juan with the prizes. Another British ship, loaded with military provisions, was captured the following year. Operating on its own, La Aurora captured a Netherlands sloop, La Sara, near the coast of Santo Domingo. Meanwhile, La Perla, La Juana and El Fénix were employed in diplomatic voyages. Transporting royal documents when requested became a recurrent mission. La Aurora and El Águila ferried members of the judiciary branch, including Fernández. La Modista continued with this success, also seizing a French frigate named La Trinidad de Burdeos off Vieques. However, this particular prey created a conflict between Enríquez and Pozo, who argued that it should have been considered spoils of war rather than privateering goods. The privateer won this conflict, retaining its cargo.

On October 16, 1719, the royal vessel San Carlos docked in San Juan and Pozo filled a complaint. The boat needed repairs and requested Enríquez's help, who determined that the damage had been caused due to excessive cargo. He responded by donating La Trinidad de Burdeos for free. This move disarmed Pozo's posture, but the functionary replaced them with new bold claims, even claiming that the frigate was damaged. All of the treasurer's complaints were dismissed and the ship left port. That same year a conglomerate of his enemies sent a letter to the king, completely composed by critics and false accusations. However, within a year Phillip V wrote a personal letter thanking Enríquez for his service. His fleet had become the de facto guardian of the Caribbean, surpassing the efficiency of the Armada de Barlovento.

=== Regional patrol, second Danío administration (1720-1724) ===
Another foreign settlement took place at the San Juan cays. Once again, the privateering fleet was responsible for making the situation public. This time the invaders were Danish, who had not only populated the cays, but already possessed functional agriculture. They were also working on the fortification of the settlements and building a port. However, the local authorities largely ignored the matter. Bertolano repeated his previous actions and ordered Enríquez to send a vessel to confirm the rumors. The ship returned with two Danish prizes captured during this visit. Despite this, the government only sent letters informing of the development to Madrid and the Viceroy of New Spain. On June 5, 1720, Phllip V requested Enríquez to loan all of his privateering sloops for this operation. However, the coincidental arrival of a small fleet from the Armada de Barlovendo changed the established course of action. The local authorities organized a reunion to discuss what the proper course was. The commander of the fleet, Rodrigo de Torres, provided several excuses to avoid participating in the incursion, which included a lack of knowledge and unfavorable weather conditions. Ultimately, he refused to take action due to the lack of a direct order. However, a communication from the viceroy detailing that a royal request ordered him to redirect the Armada de Barlovento to Puerto Rico for this purpose complicated the matters. Enríquez felt that a single frigate was all that would be needed since his ships were enough to complete a competent fleet. Torres' then offered more excuses and argued that the circumstances were not favorable, lacking the element of surprise. The Armada de Barlovento left the Port of San Juan afterwards and the operation was eventually aborted . To further complicate matters, the political climate had changed just months before due to the alliance's victory over Spain, which resulted in the Treaty of The Hague. The cays remained populated by foreigners, being inhabited by British and Dutch living under the flag of Denmark.

Danío was assigned to serve a second term as governor, but this time his partnership with Enríquez soured. Due to this, the ships usually left San Juan without established routes or return dates, capturing their prizes as they encountered them. Even when they left with a predetermined destination, desertion and other factors commonly complicated their voyages. For the most part, the ships operated under the discretion of their respective captains. On occasion, they would even randomly ambush local vessels claiming that they were intervening to "prevent contraband". Their tactics also placed them at odds with friendly ships, such as the Santo Domingo-based La Concordia, which almost captured La Modista. On March 13, 1721, a French merchant named Francisco de la Get, captain of the frigate Nuestra Señora de la Leche, brought a captured vessel intending to contact Enríquez. They reached an agreement and the captain received the loan of La Modista and La Blanca, which would join the frigate to form a flotilla. The first mission of this alliance was plagued by problems, with La Blanca being forced to remain in San Juan. The crews of the different ships were also incapable of reaching a consensus regarding the prizes that should be captured, with Enríquez's group trying to avoid Spanish ships. Shortly afterwards, their alliance was dissolved.

When the sloop Santiago docked in San Juan carrying royal documents and the governor-elect of Caracas, Danío ordered Enríquez to loan another vessel to transport the politician. The privateer complied and granted them La Venganza, which sailed under Mateo de Luque. The ship then stopped at Cumaná to deliver the documents. In the return trip, La Venganza captured a British ship, sending its prey back to San Juan and docking at Buenavista awaiting further orders. While there, Danío ordered that La Venganza completed an escort mission to Santiago. The governor had declared the British ship a legitimate prize, but as soon as the party left he changed his original ruling. The mission concluded when they received orders to return directly, but the supplies were low and they tried to set up an enemy ship by flying a friendly flag. Instead, they were ambushed by the British, who initially intended to leave the crew stranded at Jamaica. However, once the boarding party found the papers of the ship captured during their previous mission, they were reclassified as pirates. The crew was placed on trial as soon as they arrived to Jamaica and 33 of the 41 members of the crew were executed shortly afterward.

Enríquez blamed the inconsistent orders issued by Danío for the audacious actions of his sailors. After ordering the arrest of Enríquez, the governor created a system of official privateering. He reassigned the sloop Santiago, that he confiscated along other property, towards these ends. Miguel de Ubides, a prennial critic of Enríquez, became involved in this venture. The plan backfired and the ship was captured by a pirate brigantine sailing from Martinique in its first mission. The entire blame fell on Danío, who had staffed the boat with an inexperienced crew that did not know how to react once they witnessed a ship flying the jolly roger. Seeking an escape, the governor devised an account where he blamed Antonio Camino, one of the privateer's allies. According to this claim, he had provided route information to the outlaws, supposedly acting on Enríquez's behalf. Danío claimed that the privateer formed an alliance with the pirates so that he could freely import illegal contraband. The governor tried to bribe a Saint Thomas sailor with 1,000 pieces of eight, so that this account had a witness to back it.

=== Operations during the Anglo-Spanish War (1727–1729) ===
After winning the power struggle over Danío, Enríquez resumed his privateering business. On July 21, 1727, one of his ships brought a British prize, which was renamed El Postillón, quickly becoming an instrumental part of the fleet. Led by El Postillón, El Pequeño P., La Amarilla, La Verdad and La Fe, his vessels captured 56 British merchant ships during the Anglo-Spanish War. This constituted nearly half of their merchant fleet operating in the region. The impact of his campaign against British merchants was such that on February 24, 1728, Enríquez became the topic of the House of Commons of Great Britain in London. There, its members decided to send several military captains to directly attack the corsair fleet. Several warships were sent to San Juan in order to demand restitution for the lost vessels. The British ambassador to Madrid also wrote to the Spanish Secretary for the Navy, Indies and Foreign Affairs José Patiño demanding the return of the vessels. These requests did not produce an immediate effect and were largely ignored. Enríquez was a topic of inquiry in the House of Commons twelve times during a period of five years, being recognized as the single biggest threat to Atlantic commerce and earning him the nickname "The Grand Archivillain" to reflect the antagonism that he provoked. Most complaints were filed by military officers and governors from Jamaica.

=== Geopolitical changes and disbandment (1730-1733) ===
As the war came to an end and the years went by the number of prizes captured became consistently smaller due to Spain's shifting its focus to the Mediterranean. In 1731, Enríquez sent two sloops to spy on a British warship that had been sailing adjacent to San Juan for a week. This action interfered with the international relations between both nations, since Patiño (promoted a year earlier to Secretary of State for the Treasury of Spain) now intended to rebuild the Empire's Armada and required peace to accomplish this task. Enríquez employed one of his ships to ferry Matías de Abadía to San Juan after the vessel that was transporting the new governor lost registration midway. Despite these considerations, he was unable to sway the career military officer to his side. Despite being under constant pressure, Enríquez tried to continue his privateering business, expecting things to normalize as they had in the past. However, his venture suffered directly and his fleet only captured two confirmed prizes, both of which were Spanish ships that were carrying contraband and were seized by the sloop La Isabela. Due to the circumstances, vessels previously under his direct control, spent most of their time operating outside Puerto Rico, since they were otherwise employed in non-lucrative government missions when they returned. Enríquez systematically lost all of his ships except a small schooner, which the governor ordered to be disarmed.

== Bibliography ==
- López Cantós, Ángel (1994). Miguel Enríquez: Corsario boricua del siglo XVIII (in Spanish). Ediciones Puerto. ISBN 0942347048.
- Marley, David F. (2008). Wars of the Americas : a chronology of armed conflict in the Western Hemisphere, 1492 to the present. ABC-CLIO. ISBN 978-1-59884-100-8.
- Miller, Paul Gerald (1922). Historia de Puerto Rico (in Spanish). Department of Public Instruction of Puerto Rico. ISBN 1246389746.
- Moya Pons, Frank (2007). History of the Caribbean: plantations, trade, and war in the Atlantic world. Markus Wiener Publishers. ISBN 978-1558764149.
- Navarro García, Luis (1983). Historia general de España y América: los primeros Borbones. América en el siglo XVIII. Tomo XI-1, Volumen 11. Ediciones Rialp. ISBN 9788432121074.
- Ribes Tovar, Federico (1970). Enciclopedia Puertorriqueña Ilustrada: The Puerto Rican Heritage Encyclopedia, Volume 1 (in Spanish). Ultra Educational Publishers. ISBN 0915534207.
