= Turn Joe =

Irish pirate and privateer

- Occupation: Privateer

Turn Joe (fl. 1718) was an Irish pirate and privateer who left English service and sailed for Spain instead as a guarda costa privateer in the Caribbean.

== History ==
Turn Joe, “a bold enterprising Fellow,” commanded a trio of ships under commission from a Spanish Governor in the Caribbean. Off Long Island in the Bahamas in late 1718 his ships were attacked by three pirates led by John Auger and Phineas Bunce, who mistook the Spanish vessels for salt-trading sloops. The pirate vessel commanded by Bunce approached and demanded the Spanish ships surrender but was met with a hail of small arms fire, killing or wounding many of the pirates. The survivors leapt overboard and swam ashore. The second pirate ship mistook the gunfire as Bunce's and approached the anchored ships, only to be met with gunfire. Again many of them were wounded and the remainder swam ashore. The third pirate ship repeated the mistakes of the first two and was captured immediately afterward. Turn Joe's Spanish ships suffered no casualties.

After questioning his prisoners, Turn Joe put the wounded men and those he'd determined to have been forced into piracy aboard a spare boat and released them to sail back to New Providence. Bunce died of his wounds soon after arriving. Woodes Rogers had been tasked with pacifying the pirates plaguing the Bahamas. When word reached New Providence that a number of pirates were nearby and likely vulnerable, Rogers sent pardoned pirate Benjamin Hornigold to retrieve them. Hornigold returned with John Auger and the surviving pirates; they were tried in November 1718 and hanged shortly after. Turn Joe himself was eventually hunted down and killed by privateer John Bonnevie.

Note that while trial records for Bunce and others confirm that "the said Pirates proceeded to Stocking Island where meeting the Spaniards, the Pirates were themselves taken and put ashore," they do not mention Turn Joe by name. The only information on him comes from Johnson's A General History of the Pyrates, which is of marginal reliability.

== See also ==
- George Bond, Philip Fitzgerald, William Fox, and John Bear – four other English Captains who, like Turn Joe, sailed in Spanish service.
