= Don Benito (pirate) =

- Born: Benito Socarras Y Aguero
- Occupation: Pirate
- Years active: 1725
- Piratical career
- Type: Guarda costa
- Base of operations: Caribbean
- Commands: St. Francis de la Vega

Don Benito (fl. 1725, real name possibly Benito Socarras Y Aguero) was a Spanish pirate and guarda costa privateer active in the Caribbean.

== History ==
Don Benito sailed his ship St. Francis de la Vega with a mixed crew of Spanish, French, and English sailors. He shared command with Captain Richard Holland, an Irishman who had sailed with the Spanish Navy and as a privateer as early as 1718. Some of his English crew had previously sailed with Edward England and Richard Taylor. They may have been from the East Indiaman Cassandra, which had been captured in the Indian Ocean by England then traded to Taylor, who surrendered it to the Spanish in Panama in exchange for a pardon.

Though he was commissioned by the Governor of Cuba, Don Benito sailed as far north as the Virginia Capes. There in June 1724 he captured the slave ship John and Mary as well as the Prudent Hannah and Dolphin in quick succession, taking all three as prize ships. They looted the John and Mary of its slaves, rum, gold, and nearly all its supplies. Confronted by the fifth-rate warship HMS Enterprise, they put their prisoners aboard the John and Mary and released it before making their getaway. Shortly afterwards, sailors whom they’d forced into service aboard the Prudent Hannah mutinied, capturing or killing the prize crew. They sailed it to New York where all but one of the privateers were tried and hanged.

The Spanish Captain Benito Socarras Y Aguero is likely the same Captain known as Don Benito. He cruised the Caribbean from his base in Santo Domingo as a privateer and guarda costa. Benito Socarras Y Aguero was active for over 30 years, from King William's War through at least 1725.

== See also ==
- George Bond (pirate), Philip Fitzgerald (pirate), and John Bear (pirate) – three other English Captains who, like Holland, sailed in Spanish service.
- Augustin Blanco – another Spaniard who shared Captain duties with an Englishman (Richard Hancock).
- Henry Johnson and Pedro Poleas - another English and Spanish pair who co-captained a pirate vessel.
