= Augustin Blanco =

Spanish Privateer

- Born: Baracoa, Cuba
- Years active: 1700-1725
- Known for: Attacking in open boats, and for having a mixed-race crew
- Piratical career
- Type: Guarda costa
- Base of operations: Caribbean

Augustin Blanco (fl. 1700–1725) was a Spanish pirate and guarda costa privateer active in the Caribbean. He was noted for attacking in open boats, and for having a mixed-race crew.

== History ==
Blanco was from Baracoa, Cuba, and had been operating in the Caribbean for some time: “an old robber among these Islands about 25 years.” His crew was noted for being mixed-race, including “English, Scots, Spaniards, Mulattoes, and Negroes.” His co-Captain was an Englishman, Richard Hancock.

Blanco had received commission as a guarda costa privateer from Don Carlos Sucre y Pardo, Governor of Santiago de Cuba; the English complained that the Spaniards abused these commissions to attack English towns, logwood cutters, and others. In March 1725 Blanco attacked the Jamaica-bound sloop Snapper by rowing alongside in an open periagua. Blanco threatened to attack New Providence and “give no quarter,” and also claimed the Spanish Governor had forced him to attack the English and take prisoners who would be used as laborers by the Spanish. He landed on Eleuthera where some of the sloop's crew escaped, but where Blanco looted an English settlement and took several prisoners.

Bahamas Governor George Phenney armed two sloops with troops from his garrison and sent them after Blanco, but their search proved futile. Phenney sent letters of complaint to Governor of Havana Don Gregorio Guazo y Calderón, who responded that he had no authority over Baracoa or Santiago de Cuba. Phenny further fortified Nassau but could not protect outlying islands where traders sailed to collect salt and logwood and requested the King send a warship to help secure the area from pirates.

== See also ==
- Richard Frowd, another pirate noted for his mixed-race crew.
- Richard Noland, who like Hancock shared Captain duties with a Spaniard, in his case Don Benito.
- Henry Johnson and Pedro Poleas - another English and Spanish pair who co-captained a pirate vessel.
- Matthew Luke and Simon Mascarino, two other Spanish guarda costa privateers caught by English pirate hunters
