= Matt Luke =

Matt Luke may refer to:

- Matt Luke (American football) (born 1976), American college football coach and former player
- Matt Luke (baseball) (born 1971), American former Major League Baseball player

== See also ==
- Matthew Luke (died 1722), Italian pirate in the Caribbean
