= Simon Mascarino =

18th-century Portuguese pirate

- Occupation: Pirate
- Years active: 1701–1721
- Piratical career
- Type: Guarda costa
- Allegiance: Spanish
- Base of operations: Caribbean
- Commands: Revenge

Simon Mascarino (fl. 1701–1721) was a Portuguese pirate active in the Caribbean. He was also a privateer in service of the Spanish.

== History ==
Spanish guarda costa privateers had captured the sloop Revenge from the English, and in early 1721 it was captained by Simon Mascarino, a “noted villain in these parts where he has been privatier and pirate above 20 years.” He had a commission from the Governor of St. Jago to cruise against English ships and settlements of Jamaica. After looting a Jamaican schooner, Mascarino's Revenge was caught by the Royal Navy's Captain Vernon of Jamaica.

Vernon wrote that Mascarino had been augmenting his crew with anyone he could find: “His crew was made up of all nations and colours.” The Frenchmen of his crew were sent to the French Governor at Santo Domingo, who executed them. Black and mulatto members of his crew were sold into slavery unless they could prove their status as freedmen, which some did. Vernon also took aboard several Englishmen which the Spanish had been holding prisoner at Havana for use at hard labor. He was also able to show that the Revenge itself had been captured when Spain and England were at peace, proving that Mascarino had been using his privateering commission as a pretense for piracy.

== See also ==
- Admiralty court, the special venue in which Mascarino would be tried.
- Augustin Blanco and Matthew Luke, two other guarda costa privateers sought by English pirate-hunters.
