= Phineas Bunce =

Pirate active in the Caribbean

- Died: 1718
- Cause of death: Killed by a Spanish pirate hunter
- Occupation: Pirate
- Known for: Pardoned for piracy but reverted to it immediately afterwards
- Criminal status: Pardoned
- Piratical career
- Base of operations: Caribbean

Phineas Bunce (died 1718, last name occasionally Bunch) was a pirate active in the Caribbean. He was pardoned for piracy but reverted to it immediately afterwards and was killed by a Spanish pirate hunter.

== History ==
Along with hundreds of other pirates in the Caribbean, Bunce accepted the general pardon offered in 1717 by King George I of Great Britain to all pirates who surrendered within a year. After taking the pardon, Bunce and fellow pardoned pirate Dennis MacCarthy “began to rattle and talk with great pleasure and much boasting of their former exploits when they had been pirates, crying up a pirate’s life to be the only life for a man of spirit.” Nevertheless, newly installed Governor of the Bahamas Woodes Rogers trusted them to sail aboard a three-ship trading mission.

Shortly after setting sail the schooner Bachelor’s Adventure and the sloops Mary and Lancaster anchored for the night, where the Captains met aboard the schooner to discuss their schedules. After pretending to ask the captain for a beer, Bunce announced that the ship belonged to him, beating men with a cutlass while MacCarthy held them at gunpoint. He also declared that the Mary was already on their side, its Captain John Auger (another pardoned pirate) having joined Bunce's mutiny.

They marooned anyone who refused to join them on Green Key, a desolate island. They left Captain Greenaway a small ship and warned him not to leave until they were long gone; he did so anyway and was caught, escaping onto the island before the pirates scuttled his vessel. Auger, Bunce, and the others returned to Green Key several times to torment the marooned sailors.

Soon they encountered some ships at anchor at a nearby island. Thinking they were salt collectors, they attacked but were met with gunfire. The ships were not salt traders but Spanish guarda costa privateers commanded by Turn Joe. The Spanish captured the pirates without sustaining any casualties of their own. Turn Joe then released the men who had been forced into piracy and the wounded, allowing them to sail back to New Providence. Bunce had been seriously injured in the fighting and died before he could be brought to trial. Auger and the others survived only to be immediately captured by Benjamin Hornigold and John Cockram, who had become pirate hunters for Woodes Rogers after accepting the pardon. All but one of the surviving pirates were tried and hanged in December 1718.

== See also ==
- Josiah Burgess – Another pardoned pirate who led a respectable life afterwards and sat as one of the judges at the trial.
