= Henry Johnson (pirate) =

Irish pirate

- Occupation: Pirate
- Years active: 1730-1732
- Known for: An autobiography written by a sailor he captured and marooned
- Piratical career
- Nickname: Henriques the Englishman
- Base of operations: Caribbean
- Commands: Two Brothers

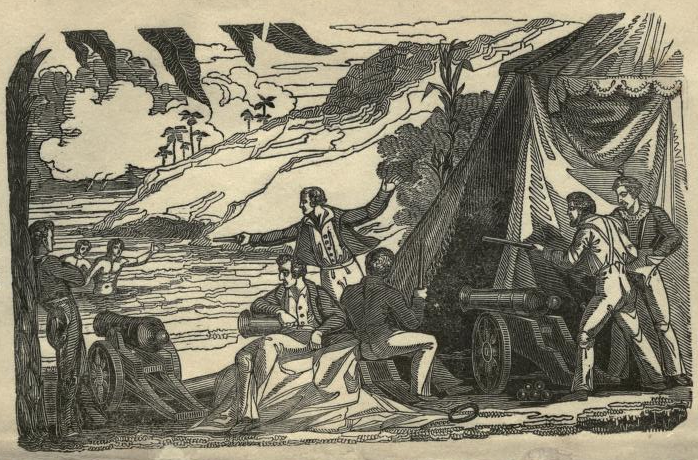
John Cockburn, marooned by pirates Johnson and Poleas, swims to shore with the pirates' gunner.

Henry Johnson (fl. 1730s) was an Irish pirate active in the Caribbean. He shared captaincy with a Spaniard, Pedro Poleas. Johnson was best known thanks to an autobiography written by a sailor he captured and marooned.

== History ==
Johnson and Poleas jointly commanded the Rhode Island-built 18-gun, 90-man sloop Two Brothers. He was known as a ruthless and bloodthirsty pirate, said to be an excellent shot despite missing a hand: “though he has but one hand, he fires a piece very dexterously, laying the barrel upon his stump, and drawing the trigger with his right hand.” He was also said to keep loaded pistols with him, even when he slept, in case of surprise attack or to take his own life if capture was imminent. Johnson was Irish but was called “Henriques the Englishman” (Note: Sometimes spelled Henrique or Henricus instead of Henriques; his co-captain is sometimes spelled Polias instead of Poleas.) by his majority-Spanish crew.

In early 1730 or 1731 he attacked the 18-gun, 25-man John and Anne (Note: Often referred to as John and Jane, though the eyewitness account records it as John and Anne.) near Jamaica. The two vessels fought a five-hour running battle before the John and Anne surrendered. Johnson's pirates boarded and looted the John and Anne, threatening to hang its crew for daring to resist. Johnson forced his crew to stand down, and they agreed to maroon several of the prisoners instead. Johnson also intervened when Poleas tried to rape the pregnant wife of the ship's doctor, who had been killed in the fighting. Despite his fearsome reputation, he gave her back her clothes and belongings and promised her protection.

The incident was recorded by John Cockburn, a passenger on the John and Anne who was marooned by Johnson's pirates. The pirates’ gunner was marooned along with them for arguing over spoils; together he and Cockburn swam to a pirate camp on the mainland to ask for help. Cockburn did not know what became of Johnson, Poleas, the John and Anne, the woman, or the rest of the crew, though he records that Johnson was a wanted man throughout the American colonies. Cockburn's 1734-1735 autobiography "The Unfortunate Englishmen" (Note: Republished several times, sometimes under the title "A journey over land, from the Gulf of Honduras to the great South-sea.") told the story of his marooning, escape, and two-year-long overland journey starting with his capture by Johnson.

While some elements of the autobiography may have been sensationalized, the story itself was reported in period newspapers, such as The Weekly Register, or Universal Journal, from 23 October 1731:

Shipping. The John and Jane, Capt. Edw. Birt, from London, on the 24th of March last being in Glover's Reef, near the Bay of Honduras, was attack'd by a Spanish Sloop of ten Carriage and eight Swivel Guns, and 70 Men, Pedro Polis Master, (which Sloop lately belonged to Boston, when the was called the Two Brothers, but had been taken from the English by a Guarda Costa:) The John and Jane had but 25 Men, yet notwithstanding she maintained a Fight for four Hours, when having two Men killed, and six wounded, Capt. Birt called for Quarters: The Spaniards carried her that Day to Cavalo, where they landed the wounded, and all the rest of her Crew, except nine, which they kept on board, and carried with the Ship to Campechy, where they arrived the 20th of April, sold and confiscated the Ship, imprison'd the Men, and used them very cruelly.

In mid-1732 Johnson ("Henriquez") put in at Santiago de Cuba but his ship was seized when merchant factors complained to the Governor. Johnson traveled to Puerto Rico and attempted to bribe the newly-arrived Governor there but was refused and forced to pay a fine for his crimes, which had reached the ears of King Philip V of Spain.

== See also ==
- Richard Noland and Don Benito – Irish and Spanish pair who co-captained a pirate vessel.
- Richard Hancock and Augustin Blanco – another English and Spanish pair who co-captained a pirate vessel.
