= George Phenney =

George Phenney was governor of the Bahamas, a customs collector in the southern colonies and council member. He served as governor of the Bahama islands from 1721 to 1727.

After leaving the governorship, he was accused of impropriety in court marshaling an officer against whom he had a grudge. This accusation led to his confinement in a dungeon for 18 months. On December 3, 1731, Phenney sought appointment as surveyor general of customs for the Southern District in America as well as a seat on the councils of these colonies. He was appointed on February 24, 1732. He was also named to the councils of Virginia and South Carolina. He was also added to the North Carolina council on November 30, 1733.
