= John Bear (pirate) =

17th-century English pirate

- Born: John Philip Bear
- Piratical career
- Other names: John Beare, Jean de Wer (in French service)
- Type: Privateer, Guarda costa
- Allegiance: England (1684–1687), Spain (1687–1688), France (1689)
- Years active: 1684–1689
- Rank: Captain
- Base of operations: Nevis, Havana, Puerto Rico, Vera Cruz, Petit-Goave
- Commands: Unnamed sloop, frigate James, ship Golden Fleece

John Philip Bear, last name also spelled Beare, was a 17th-century English pirate active in the Caribbean who also served with the Spanish and French.

== Biography ==
=== Privateer for the English ===
Bear was granted a privateering commission in September 1684 by Governor William Stapleton of Nevis, which he used to attack Spanish ships despite the commission only giving him leave to attack Indians and pirates. The Dutch Governor of Curacao in January 1685 ordered Bear tried for capturing a Spanish ship while the Dutch were at peace with Spain, which Bear avoided. However, in April 1686 Bear led a raid on Tortola, capturing slaves and abusing Dutch and English prisoners. As a result, the Dutch abandoned Tortola's fledgling colony. That July Stapleton renewed Bear's commission when Bear appeared in a different ship, claiming his former sloop was leaking which forced them to transfer to the frigate James.

Stapleton confirmed Bear's capture of the Spanish ship La Soldad in October; Bear claimed he had been searching for the ship that assaulted Tortola when La Soldad attacked him. Captain St. Loe of HMS Dartmouth, the Royal Navy warship on station at Nevis, complained at length about Stapleton and Nevis' Deputy Governor Russell ("a great favourer of privateers"), who went out of their way to enable and protect Bear's piracies. In turn Russell complained of St. Loe: "His insolence to me, and his abuses to all Deputy-Governors and Councils of these Islands want a better pen than mine to describe".

=== Turn to guarda-costas ===
Governor Molesworth of Jamaica wrote in August 1687 that Bear had turned pirate, openly attacking English ships. Bear had transferred his allegiance to Spain, marrying a supposed noblewoman in Havana with much celebration. Molesworth was not fooled: "The nobleman's daughter is a strumpet that he used to carry with him in man's apparel, and is the daughter of a rum-punch-woman of Port Royal". Bear apparently had kept his soon-to-be wife aboard his ship, dressed in men's clothes. Under Spanish colors he sailed as a guarda costa privateer, patrolling from Havana and Puerto Rico.

While Bear still engaged in some legitimate commerce (called "a man of good repute and an ancient trader to Jamaica"), by early 1688 he was capturing, looting, and releasing ships regularly, taking three in January alone from his 400 ton, 30-gun Golden Fleece.

Molesworth dispatched HMS Guernsey "to demand the surrender of the pirate Bear, or failing that, to seek him out and destroy him", though the Spanish would not give him up. Bear was still there by February 1688, and may have moved to Vera Cruz that May where he and others had captured at least six more English vessels. A rescued English prisoner claimed that after Bear swore allegiance to Spain his English crewmen refused to sail with him; Bear then took aboard a Spanish crew and threatened the Englishmen that they had to sail with him or face prison. He had lost Golden Fleece by May 1688 but was soon building another at Havana. The Spanish plundered Saint-Domingue and Anguilla in March 1689, again led by Bear.

=== Turn to France ===
After England allied with Spain thanks to King William's War, Bear continued to hunt English ships, having sailed to Petit Goave to take a French commission from the Comte de Blenac. In French service he turned against his former Spanish sponsors, joining with Jean-Baptiste du Casse for a time, then sailing to France where he received a fresh commission before returning to the Caribbean and sacking Caracas.

== See also ==
- Jean Hamlin, another Caribbean pirate who escaped HMS Guernsey.
