= Matthew Luke =

Italian pirate (died 1722)

- Died: 1722
- Other names: Matteo Lucca, Mateo de Luque
- Occupation: Pirate
- Piratical career
- Type: Guarda costa
- Base of operations: Caribbean
- Commands: Vengeance

Matthew Luke (died 1722, occasionally named Mateo Luque or Matteo Luca) was an Italian pirate and privateer active in the Caribbean.

== History ==
Luke, originally from Genoa, had been cruising the Caribbean under commission from the Spanish Governor of Puerto Rico as a guarda costa privateer. With his sloop Vengeance (or Venganza) he had earlier captured four English vessels and murdered their crews. In April 1722 he spotted a merchant ship off of Hispaniola and moved alongside to attack it. The ship turned out to be Captain Candler's 40-gun fifth-rate frigate HMS Launceton (or Lauceston / Lanceston), sent to the Caribbean to replace the scrapped HMS Ludlow Castle.

Candler's men boarded the Vengeance, whose sailors claimed she was a merchant trader. The paper wrap from a powder cartridge was determined to be a page from the journal of a snow named Crean, whose crew had been murdered. In the ship's hold they found the rest of the 58-man crew in hiding, all of which were arrested and returned to Port Royal. The Launceton's logbooks note, "25 Apr 1722 - Cape Tiberon - captured boat from Puerto Rico with hiding crew." The crewmen were tried and shown to be pirates, one of whom confessed to killing twenty English men with his bare hands. Despite Spanish objections that the vessel had a legitimate privateering commission, over forty of the pirates were hanged.

== See also ==
- Augustin Blanco and Simon Mascarino, two other Spanish guarda costa privateers caught by English pirate hunters.
