= Index of piracy-related articles =

This page list topics related to Piracy.

== 0–9 ==
- 7 Sea Pirates
- 12 Paces Without a Head
- 20,000 Leagues Under the Sea (1916 film)
- 20,000 Leagues Under the Sea (1954 film)
- 20,000 Leagues Under the Sea (1985 film)
- 30,000 Miles Under the Sea
- 1582 Cagayan battles
- 1600s in piracy
- 1610s in piracy
- 1620s in piracy
- 1630s in piracy
- 1640s in piracy
- 1650s in piracy
- 1660s in piracy
- 1670s in piracy
- 1680s in piracy
- 1690 in piracy
- 1691 in piracy
- 1692 in piracy
- 1692 Jamaica earthquake
- 1693 in piracy
- 1694 in piracy
- 1695 in piracy
- 1696 in piracy
- 1697 in piracy
- 1698 in piracy
- 1699 in piracy
- 1700 in piracy
- 1701 in piracy
- 1702 in piracy
- 1703 in piracy
- 1704 in piracy
- 1705 in piracy
- 1706 in piracy
- 1707 in piracy
- 1708 in piracy
- 1709 in piracy
- 1711 in piracy
- 1711 Karamanli coup
- 1715 in piracy
- 1715 Treasure Fleet
- 1716 in piracy
- 1717 in piracy
- 1717–1718 Acts of Grace
- 1718 in piracy
- 1719 in piracy
- 1720 in piracy
- 1721 in piracy
- 1722 in piracy
- 1730s in piracy
- 1985 Lahad Datu ambush
- 1990s in piracy
- 2006 in piracy
- 2007 in piracy
- 2008 in piracy
- 2009 in piracy
- 2022 in piracy
- 2023 in piracy
- 2024 in piracy
- 2025 in piracy

== A ==
- Aaron Smith (mariner)
- Aayirathil Oruvan (1965 film)
- Abbott and Costello Meet Captain Kidd
- Abdulla al-Hadj
- Abduwali Muse
- Abraham Blauvelt
- Abraham Samuel
- Abraham Tuizentfloot
- Abshir Boyah
- Abu Hafs Umar al-Iqritishi
- A Captain's Duty
- Action of 1 August 1801
- Action of 2 June 1803
- Action of 3 March 2009
- Action of 7 July 1804
- Action of 7 September 2009
- Action of 8 May 1802
- Action of 9 November 1822
- Action of 11 November 2008
- Action of 15 August 1799
- Action of 16 April 1755
- Action of 17 June 1802
- Action of 18 March 2006
- Action of 19 February 1619
- Action of 22 June 1803
- Action of 28 October 2007
- Action of 30 March 2010
- Action of 31 October 1803
- Act of Piracy
- Acts of grace (piracy)
- Act to protect the commerce of the United States and punish the crime of piracy
- Adam Baldridge
- Adam Elliot (traveller)
- Adam Hyler
- Admiral Juel
- Admiral Kingsmill (1796 ship)
- Adolphe (1803 privateer lugger)
- Adolphe (1807 privateer lugger)
- Adrian Claver
- Adventure (1804 ship)
- Adventure Galley
- Adèle (1800 brig)
- Aegean Sea anti-piracy operations of the United States
- Affair at Little Egg Harbor
- AFI's 100 Years...100 Heroes & Villains
- African Slave Trade Patrol
- Against All Flags
- A General History of the Pyrates
- Agent Red
- Age of Pirates 2: City of Abandoned Ships
- Aggie (1777 ship)
- Agron of Illyria
- A High Wind in Jamaica (film)
- A High Wind in Jamaica (novel)
- A Hijacking
- Aimable Joséphine (1809 ship)
- Air pirate
- Alamanno da Costa
- Albanian piracy
- Albert Salmi
- Albert W. Hicks
- Alestorm
- Alexander Dalzeel
- Alexander Ellice (Royal Navy officer)
- Alexander Godfrey
- Alexander Hamilton (Bombay Marine officer)
- Alexander J. Dallas (United States Navy officer)
- Alexander McDougall
- Alexander Murray (1755–1821)
- Alexander Selkirk
- Alexander Spotswood
- Alexandre Bras-de-Fer
- Alexandre Exquemelin
- Alexandria Bay, New York
- Alexis Grassin
- Alf and Alfhild
- Algiers
- Ali Arraez Rabazin
- Ali Bitchin
- Alicia Deane
- Alicia Hill (1811 ship)
- Alonso de Contreras
- Alonzo Bosco
- Alv Erlingsson
- Amaro Pargo
- Ambroise Louis Garneray
- Ambrose Cowley
- Ambrose Light (ship)
- Ameinias the Phocian
- American privateer Holkar
- American privateer Warrior
- American-Algerian War
- A Modern Buccaneer
- Amyas Preston
- Ancient Mediterranean piracy
- Andrea Doria
- Andrea Morisco
- Andresen & Schmidt
- Andrew Barker (merchant)
- Andrew Barton (privateer)
- Andrew Mwangura
- Andrew Sterett
- Andrew Wood of Largo
- Ang Alamat ng Lawin
- Angelo Emo
- Anglo-Turkish piracy
- Anicetus (pirate)
- Anjirō
- Anne Bonnie (comics)
- Anne Bonny
- Anne Dieu-le-Veut
- Anne of the Indies
- Antelope (1798 ship)
- Antelope (1851 clipper)
- Anthony Knivet
- Anthony Maitland, 10th Earl of Lauderdale
- Anthony Shirley
- Anti-piracy measures in Somalia
- Anti Piracy Maritime Security Solutions
- Antipope John XXIII
- Antoine-Joseph Preira
- Antoine Bollo
- Antoine Qaurtier
- Antongil Bay
- Antonio Barceló
- António de Faria
- A Pirate of Exquisite Mind
- April 2009 raid off Somalia
- Aquaman (film)
- Arbuthnot (schooner)
- Arcadia of My Youth: Endless Orbit SSX
- Arcadia of My Youth
- Arnaut Mami
- Artemisia I of Caria
- Arthur Sinclair
- Arthur Wakefield
- Aruj Barbarossa
- Arumer Zwarte Hoop
- Asbury Harpending
- Assassin's Creed III
- Assassin's Creed IV: Black Flag
- Assault on a Queen
- Asterix
- A Submarine Pirate
- Atlantic slave trade
- Attack on Spanish oiler Patiño
- Attack on Veracruz
- August 2009 Egyptian hostage escape
- Auguste (1808 privateer)
- Auguste (1811 privateer)
- Augustin Blanco
- Augustine Herman
- Augustus Magee
- Avenger of the Seven Seas
- A Voyage to the South Sea, and Round the World
- Álvaro de Bazán the Elder

== B ==
- Babiole (1811 ship)
- Badass (book)
- Badger escape
- Baghlah
- Bajak
- Balangay
- Baltazar de Cordes
- Balthasar Oomkens von Esens
- Baltic Slavic piracy
- Baltimore, County Cork
- Bangkong
- Barataria Bay
- Barbara the Fair with the Silken Hair
- Barbary Coast
- Barbary corsairs
- Barbary Pirate (film)
- Barbary slave trade
- Barbary treaties
- Barbary Wars
- Barbary–Portuguese conflicts
- Barca-longa
- Barney Baxter
- Barnim VI
- Baron de Binder (1782 ship)
- Barrett's Privateers
- Bartholomeus de Jager
- Bartholomew Gosnold
- Bartholomew Roberts
- Bartholomew Sharp
- Bartolomeu Português
- Basil Ringrose
- Batavia (1628 ship)
- Batman: Leatherwing
- Batman: The Return of Bruce Wayne
- Battle of Antón Lizardo
- Battle of Blomindon
- Battle of Boca Teacapan
- Battle of Cape Fear River
- Battle of Cape Lopez
- Battle of Cape Palos (1815)
- Battle of Chestnut Neck
- Battle of Derna (1805)
- Battle of Doro Passage
- Battle off Cape Gata
- Battle off Halifax (1780)
- Battle off Halifax (1782)
- Battle off Liverpool, Nova Scotia (1778)
- Battle off Mukah
- Battle of Korakesion
- Battle of Makarska
- Battle of Manila (1574)
- Battle of Minicoy Island
- Battle of Nam Quan
- Battle of New Orleans
- Battle of Pianosa
- Battle of the Leotung
- Battle of the Tiger's Mouth
- Battle of Tonkin River
- Battle of Tunmen
- Battle of Ty-ho Bay
- Battle of Tysami
- Battle Stadium D.O.N
- Bawarij
- Bayda, Libya
- Bay Fleet
- Baymen
- Bay of Saint-Augustin
- Beaver Island (Lake Michigan)
- Bedar (ship)
- Belisarius (1781 ship)
- Bellamy Cay
- Bellona (1804 ship)
- Benedict Arnold
- Ben Gunn (Treasure Island)
- Benito de Soto
- Benjamin Boyd
- Benjamin Fletcher
- Benjamin Hornigold
- Benjamin Williams Crowninshield
- Ben Pease
- Bent Salvesen
- Berend Jacobsen Karpfanger
- Bernard Claesen Speirdyke
- Bernard Desjean, Baron de Pointis
- Between God, the Devil and a Winchester
- Beverly Hills Family Robinson
- Bharat (film)
- Bill Badger and the Pirates
- Bill Johnston (pirate)
- Billy Bones
- Birkett D. Fry
- Biscayneer (1779 ship)
- Blackbeard's Castle
- Blackbeard's Ghost
- Blackbeard's Law
- Blackbeard's Point
- Blackbeard (miniseries)
- Blackbeard (musical)
- Blackbeard: Terror at Sea
- Blackbeard in popular culture
- Blackbeard Island National Wildlife Refuge
- Blackbeard the Pirate
- Blackbeard
- Blackbird, Delaware
- Blackbirding
- Black Caesar (pirate)
- Black Flags, Blue Waters
- Blackie the Pirate
- Black Jack Anderson
- Black Lagoon (TV series)
- Black Lagoon
- Black Manta
- Black Pirate
- Black Sails (TV series)
- Black Sea hostage crisis
- Black Sea slave trade
- Black Spot (Treasure Island)
- Blackthorn Winter (Wilson novel)
- Black Vulmea's Vengeance
- Black Zero
- Blenheim (1783 ship)
- Blockade of Africa
- Blockade of the Tetuan River
- Blonde (1803 ship)
- Bloody flag
- Bloody Jack (novel)
- Blunderbuss
- Bodacious Space Pirates
- Bombardment of Algiers (1816) order of battle
- Bombardment of Algiers (1816)
- Bombardment of Salé (1628)
- Bona (1809 ship)
- Bordelais (1798 ship)
- Boudewijn Hendricksz
- Boukris
- Bounty Bible
- Bowie knife
- Boysie Singh
- Braulio Peña
- Breed of the Sea
- BREIN
- Brethren of the Coast
- Brigantine
- Brigstock Weaver
- Brig
- British Tar (1797 ship)
- British transport vessels for the Persian Gulf campaign of 1819
- Broadsides and Boarding Parties
- Broder Svensson
- Brook (One Piece)
- Browne Bushell
- Buccaneer's Girl
- Buccaneer (mascot)
- Buccaneer Bunny
- Buccaneer
- Bully Hayes
- Bunker Hill (1778 ship)
- Buried treasure
- Butterworth (1785 ship)
- Butterworth Stavely
- Bêlit

== C ==
- Cabeza de Perro
- Cai Qian
- Campeche (city)
- Campfire Tales (1991 film)
- Campuzano-Polanco family
- Candle Cove
- Canoot
- Canterbury (ship)
- Cap'n Crunch
- Captain Alexander Smollett
- Captain America: The Winter Soldier
- Captain Blood (1924 film)
- Captain Blood (1935 film)
- Captain Blood (2025 video game)
- Captain Blood (novel)
- Captain Blood Returns
- Captain Bogg and Salty
- Captain Butler
- Captain Calamity (film)
- Captain Charles Johnson
- Captain Clegg (film)
- Captain Crapo
- Captain Davy
- Captain Fear
- Captain Flint
- Captain Gincks
- Captain Grinnaway
- Captain Hareblower
- Captain Harlock (character)
- Captain Harlock (manga)
- Captain Harlock: Dimensional Voyage
- Captain Harlock and the Queen of a Thousand Years
- Captain Hook
- Captain Horatio Hornblower
- Captain in Calico
- Captain Kate
- Captain Kidd's cannon
- Captain Kidd's Kids
- Captain Kidd (film)
- Captain Kidd, Wapping
- Captain Kidd and the Slave Girl
- Captain Morgan's Revenge
- Captain Morgan
- Captain Napin
- Captain Nemo (miniseries)
- Captain Nemo and the Underwater City
- Captain Nemo
- Captain Phillips (film)
- Captain Pirate
- Captain Pugwash
- Captain Sabertooth and the Magic Diamond
- Captain Sabertooth
- Captain Silver
- Captain Singleton
- Captain Slaughterboard Drops Anchor
- Captain Sternn
- Captain Stingaree
- Captain Veale
- Capture of Fort Rocher
- Capture of John Rackham
- Capture of Manuel Briones
- Capture of the brig Brillante
- Capture of the Grand Mughal Fleet
- Capture of the schooner Bravo
- Capture of the sloop Anne
- Capture of the sloop Ranger
- Capture of the Tuapse
- Capture of the Veloz Passagera
- Capture of USS Hancock
- Caracossa
- Cara Mehmed
- Caribbean Gold
- Caroline (1804 ship)
- Caroline affair
- Carré d'As IV incident
- Caspar Henrik Wolfsen
- Castaways of the Flying Dutchman
- Castle in the Sky
- Cave-In-Rock, Illinois
- Ch'od
- Chain of Command (2000 film)
- Chaloner Ogle
- Charles Augustus Lafayette Lamar
- Charles Bellamy
- Charles Churchill (mutineer)
- Charles Cunat
- Charles Eden (politician)
- Charles Ekins
- Charles Elliot
- Charles François d'Angennes, Marquis de Maintenon
- Charles Gibbs
- Charles Harris (pirate)
- Charles Johnson (writer)
- Charles Mary Wentworth (1798 ship)
- Charles Morris (naval officer)
- Charles Stewart (United States Navy officer)
- Charles Swan (pirate)
- Charles Vane
- Charles Yeats
- Charles Yorke, 4th Earl of Hardwicke
- Charlotte Badger
- Charlotte de Berry
- Charlton Street Gang
- Charming Sally (1779 ship)
- Chasseur (1812 clipper)
- Chatham Roberdeau Wheat
- Chen Tianbao
- Chen Zuyi
- Cheonghae Unit
- Chepo expedition
- Cheshire Crossing
- Chesterfield (1806 ship)
- Cheung Po Tsai
- Chevalier du Plessis
- Child pirate
- China Seas (film)
- Chinese anti-piracy operations in the Gulf of Aden
- Christina Anna Skytte
- Christopher Goffe
- Christopher Moody
- Christopher Myngs
- Christopher Newport
- Christopher Winter (pirate)
- Chui A-poo
- Church of Our Lady of Hope, Mosta
- Cilician pirates
- Cinque Ports (1703 ship)
- Claes Gerritszoon Compaen
- Claude Deschiens
- Clinton Atkinson
- Clothes Make the Pirate
- Coast of High Barbaree
- Cobra (manga)
- Cocos Island
- Cold Steel (1921 film)
- Colin Woodard
- Colonel Plug
- Combined Task Force 150
- Combined Task Force 151
- Come Away
- Comet (1810 schooner)
- Commander Kraken
- Commerce (1800 ship)
- Companion parrot
- Complement of HMS Bounty
- Conan of the Isles
- Conan the Barbarian
- Confederate privateer
- Confiance (1797 ship)
- Conflict (novel)
- Connor (Assassin's Creed)
- Consider Phlebas
- Constantine Moorsom
- Contact Group on Piracy off the Coast of Somalia
- Contraband Days
- Convention for the Suppression of Unlawful Acts against the Safety of Maritime Navigation
- Cord Widderich
- Cori, de Scheepsjongen
- Cornelis Jol
- Cornelius Andreson
- Cornelius Essex
- Cornish Hero (1797 ship)
- Corsair (character)
- Corsair (film)
- Corsairs of Algiers
- Cossacks
- Countess of Scarborough
- Courageaux (1798 ship)
- Crabb massacre
- Craig Before the Creek
- Crimes Act of 1790
- Crimes Act of 1825
- Crimson Skies
- Crookhaven
- CrossBones (film)
- Crossbones (TV series)
- Cross border attacks in Sabah
- Crossed Swords Jolly Roger
- CSS McRae
- Cueva del Pirata
- Cumberland (1800 ship)
- Cup of Gold
- Curse of the Blue Tattoo
- Cutlass
- Cutthroat Island
- Cyprus (1816 ship)
- Cyprus mutiny
- Cythera (yacht)

== D ==
- D'Vana Tendi
- Daffy Duck's Fantastic Island
- Dai Hong Dan incident
- Dame/Crazy Rainbow
- Dame Ernouf (1807 privateer)
- Dame Ernouf
- Damian of Tarsus
- Dancing Molly
- Dancing Pirate
- Daniel Defoe
- Daniel Elfrith
- Daniel Johnson (pirate)
- Daniel Montbars
- Daniel Patterson (naval officer)
- Daniel Porter (pirate)
- Daniel Stillwell
- Danish counter-piracy strategy
- Dan Seavey
- Daphne and the Pirate
- Dart (1806 ship)
- Dart (privateer)
- David Farragut
- David Hawley
- David Herriot
- David Kirke
- David Marteen
- David Milne (Royal Navy officer)
- David Porter (naval officer)
- David Ropes
- David Williams (pirate)
- Davy Crockett and the River Pirates
- Davy Jones's locker
- Davy Jones (Pirates of the Caribbean)
- Daybreak Boys
- Dead Chest Island, British Virgin Islands
- Dead Man's Chest
- De cape et de crocs
- Decatur (1813 ship)
- Decebalus treasure
- Deep Rising
- Demetrius of Pharos
- Der Luftpirat und sein lenkbares Luftschiff
- Derna, Libya
- Descendants of the Bounty mutineers
- Destination: Treasure Island
- Detective Conan: Jolly Roger in the Deep Azure
- Devara: Part 1
- Dey
- Diabolito
- Dicaearchus of Aetolia
- Dido
- Didrik Pining
- Diego el Mulato
- Diego García de Paredes
- Dionysius the Phocaean
- Dirk Chivers
- Dispatch (1784 ship)
- Distribution of justice
- Dixie Bull
- Djibouti Armed Forces
- Doctor Syn (film)
- Doctor Syn on the High Seas
- Doctor Syn
- Doglock
- Dogtanian and the Three Muskehounds (film)
- Domingo de Goicouria
- Dominique de Gourgues
- Dominique You
- Donald Duck Finds Pirate Gold
- Don Benito (pirate)
- Doraemon: Nobita's Great Adventure in the South Seas
- Doraemon: Nobita's Treasure Island
- Double Crossbones
- Dr. Livesey (Treasure Island, 1988)
- Dr. Livesey
- Dragon Lady (Terry and the Pirates)
- Dragut
- Drake of England
- Drax (Marvel Cinematic Universe)
- Dread Pirate Roberts
- Duc de Dantzig (1808 ship)
- Dudley Saltonstall
- Duel with Samurai
- Duguay-Trouin (French privateer)
- Duncan Mackintosh
- Dunkirkers
- Dunkirk
- Dutch expedition to Algiers (1624)
- Dutch–Moroccan War (1775–1777)
- Du Teillay (1744 ship)

== E ==
- Earl Spencer (1800 ship)
- East Indiaman
- East Wood affair
- Eco-Pirate: The Story of Paul Watson
- Edmund Cooke (pirate)
- Edmund Palmer
- Edward Brace
- Edward Bransfield
- Edward Christian
- Edward Coates (pirate)
- Edward Collier (pirate)
- Edward Congdon
- Edward Davis (buccaneer)
- Edward Dempster
- Edward Denny (soldier)
- Edward Edwards (Royal Navy officer)
- Edward England
- Edward Glemham
- Edward Jordan (pirate)
- Edward Kenway
- Edward Low
- Edward Mansvelt
- Edward Miller (pirate)
- Edward Neville (pirate)
- Edward Pellew, 1st Viscount Exmouth
- Edward Preble
- Edward Spragge
- Edward Thache
- Edward Trenchard
- Edward Welch (pirate)
- Edward Woodman
- Eiichiro Oda
- Elaine Marley
- El Cazador (comics)
- El corsario negro
- Elemental Gelade
- Elharar
- Eli Boggs
- Elise Eskilsdotter
- Eliza (1802 Philadelphia ship)
- Elizabethan Sea Dogs
- Elizabeth Marsh
- Elizabeth Swann
- El Juramento de Lagardere
- Emanuel Wynn
- Emilio Changco
- English ship Dainty (1588)
- Enlightenment (Doctor Who)
- Enos Collins
- Entierro
- Ephraim Sturdivant
- Eric Cobham and Maria Lindsey
- Erik of Pomerania
- Escape Under Pressure
- Esek Hopkins
- Espoir (ship)
- Eugène-François Vidocq
- Eugénie (1793 ship)
- EU initiatives against illegal maritime activities in the Gulf of Guinea
- Eustace the Monk
- Evan Jones (pirate)
- Execution Dock
- Expedition to Mostaganem (1543)
- Eyepatch
- Eyl
- Égyptienne (ship)
- Émilie (1793 ship)
- Étienne de Montauban
- Étienne Pellot
- Étienne Perier (governor)

== F ==
- Fabled Lands
- Facing the Flag
- Fair Wind to Java
- Falklands Expedition
- False flag
- Fancy (ship)
- Fanny Campbell, the Female Pirate Captain
- Faris Scherwiz
- Fatbeard
- Felice Caronni
- Felix and the Treasure of Morgäa
- Felix von Luckner
- Fena: Pirate Princess
- Fenn treasure
- Filibuster (military)
- Filibuster War
- Filibus
- Filippo di Piero Strozzi
- Filips van Zuylen
- Final Voyage
- Finding Neverland (film)
- Firefly Estate
- Fireship of Baie des Chaleurs
- First Barbary War
- First Battle of Tripoli Harbor
- Fishing Without Nets (2014 film)
- Flag of Blackbeard
- Flame of Araby
- Flavia (martyr)
- Fletcher Christian
- Floating armoury
- Flora Burn
- Fluyt
- Flying Dutchman
- Flying Gang
- Forbes (1805 ship)
- Foreign Devil (novel)
- Fort-Dauphin (Madagascar)
- Fort Fincastle (The Bahamas)
- Fortunatus Wright
- Fortune (1800 ship)
- Fortunes of Captain Blood
- Founding of Belize
- Fowey (1798 ship)
- Fowey Gallants
- Francisco de Miranda
- Francisco de Ribera y Medina
- Francisco Menéndez (Black soldier)
- Francis Demont
- Francis Dereham
- Francis Drake's circumnavigation
- Francis Drake's expedition of 1572–1573
- Francis Drake
- Francis Fernando
- Francis Ingram
- Francis Knollys (admiral)
- Francis Leslie
- Francis Spriggs
- Francis Stuart (sailor)
- Francis Townley
- Francis Verney
- Francis Witherborn
- Franco, Ciccio e il pirata Barbanera
- Francois Grogniet
- Francois Le Sage
- Franky (One Piece)
- François-Thomas Le Même
- François Aregnaudeau
- François l'Olonnais
- François Le Clerc
- François Ripaud
- François Thurot
- Fraxinetum
- Frederick escape
- Frederick G. Nolan
- Frederick Thomas Michell
- Frederick Whitworth Aylmer, 6th Baron Aylmer
- Free Willy: Escape from Pirate's Cove
- French brig Adèle
- French brig Belliqueuse (1793)
- French brig Duc de Chartres (1780 Le Havre)
- French brig Duc de Chartres (1780 Saint-Malo)
- French brig Gironde
- French corsairs
- French corvette Bacchante (1795)
- French corvette Betzy (1793)
- French corvette Revenant
- French cutter Renard (1812)
- French frigate Aigle (1782)
- French frigate Créole
- French frigate Prudente (1790)
- French frigate Psyché (1804)
- French frigate Vestale (1756)
- French lugger Affronteur
- Frenchman's Creek (film)
- Frenchman's Creek (novel)
- French privateer Adolphe
- French privateer Bellone (1745)
- French privateer Mars (1746)
- French privateer Vengeur
- French ship Brutus (1780)
- French ship Infatigable (1798)
- French ship Jean Bart (1786)
- French ship Jean Bart
- French ship Musette (1781)
- French ship Résolue
- French ship Sophie (1790)
- French ship Vaillant (1801)
- French–Tripolitania War
- From Hare to Eternity
- From the Village to the City
- From TV Animation - One Piece: Grand Battle! 2
- From TV Animation - One Piece: Grand Battle!
- From TV Animation - One Piece: Set Sail Pirate Crew!
- Fugitives, Smugglers, and Thieves
- Full-rigged pinnace
- Full-rigged ship
- Fury at Smugglers' Bay
- Fusta
- FV Ekawat Nava 5
- FV Shahzaib
- FV Win Far No.161
- Fūma Kotarō

== G ==
- Gabriel Da Parma
- Galactic Patrol (novel)
- Galactik Football
- Galaxy Leader
- Galiot
- Galley
- Galveston, Texas
- Galveston Island
- Gamora (Marvel Cinematic Universe)
- Ganj-i-Sawai
- Gannascus
- Gan Ning
- Garay (ship)
- Garfield's Halloween Adventure
- Gargantia on the Verdurous Planet
- Gasparilla Pirate Festival
- Gaston de Raousset-Boulbon
- General Armstrong
- General Augereau (1801 ship)
- General Doyle (1803 ship)
- General Keppel (1799 ship)
- Gentius
- George Anson's voyage around the world
- George Bond (pirate)
- George Booth (pirate)
- George Charles Beckley
- George Clifford, 3rd Earl of Cumberland
- George Clinton (vice president)
- George Cusack
- George Dew
- George Leese
- George Lowther (pirate)
- George Mason University's historical hoaxes
- George Mathews (Georgia politician)
- George Paléologos de Bissipat
- George Perceval, 6th Earl of Egmont
- George Peterson (pirate)
- George R. Roberts (privateer)
- George Raynor (pirate)
- George Robert Twelves Hewes
- George Rogers Clark
- George Shelvocke
- George Somers
- George Spurre
- George Wait Babcock
- George Walker (privateer)
- George Wunder
- German tanker Spessart
- Geuzen
- Ghar el-Melh
- Ghost in the Noonday Sun
- Giant of the Evil Island
- Giddy House
- Gilbert Hedden
- Gilbert Horseley
- Gilbert Knapp
- Giles Shelley
- Giulia Gonzaga
- Giuseppe Albini (admiral)
- Glaucetas
- Gloire (1799 ship)
- God Loves Caviar
- Godspeed (Sheffield novel)
- Golden Age of Piracy
- Golden Hind
- Golden Rendezvous
- Gottfried Michaelsen
- Goutte d'Or (2013 film)
- Governance in 18th-century piracy
- Governor Trumbull (1777 ship)
- Grace O'Malley
- Gramvousa
- Grania: She-King of the Irish Seas
- Great Kentucky Hoard
- Great Lakes Patrol
- Great Thatch
- Green Mountain Boys
- Gregor MacGregor
- Grev Laurvig
- Guarda costa
- Guerrero (ship)
- Guglielmo Grasso
- Guglielmo Lorenzi
- Guillaume Le Testu
- Gulliver's Travels
- Gun Frontier (manga)
- Guns of the Black Witch
- Gustav Skytte
- Gustavus Conyngham
- Gutiérrez–Magee Expedition
- Guybrush Threepwood
- Guynemer of Boulogne
- Guðríður Símonardóttir
- Général Ernouf
- Général Pérignon (1804 ship)

== H ==
- Hadji Alia
- Hagbard Celine
- Han Solo
- Hans Pothorst
- Hans Wassard
- Harlock: Space Pirate
- Harlock Saga
- Harmony (1798 ship)
- Harpe brothers
- Harpooner (1771 ship)
- Harry Paye
- Hasko
- Hawk of the Caribbean
- Hayreddin Barbarossa
- HDMS Absalon (F341)
- Hector Barbossa
- Helen Gloag
- Hellboy: The Crooked Man and Others
- Hell Harbor
- Hendrick Lucifer
- Hendrick van der Heul
- Hendrick van Hoven
- Hendrik Brouwer
- Henri Caesar
- Henriette (1803 ship)
- Henry A. Crabb
- Henry Every
- Henry Holloway (pirate)
- Henry Jennings
- Henry Johnson (pirate)
- Henry King (pirate)
- Henry Kinney
- Henry Knollys (privateer)
- Henry Mainwaring
- Henry Middleton (captain)
- Henry Morgan's Panama expedition
- Henry Morgan's raid on Lake Maracaibo
- Henry Morgan's raid on Porto Bello
- Henry Morgan's raid on Puerto del Príncipe
- Henry Morgan in popular culture
- Henry Morgan
- Henry Strangways (pirate)
- Henry Ughtred
- Hepzibah (character)
- Herb House
- Hercules and the Black Pirates
- Hercules in the Maze of the Minotaur
- Hero's Island
- Heroína (ship)
- He Xiwen
- Heywood Manuscript
- Hezekiah Frith
- High Seas Havoc
- Hijacking of the Playa de Bakio
- Hippolyte Bouchard
- Hired armed cutter Earl Spencer
- Hired armed cutter John Bull
- Hired armed cutter Lurcher
- His Majesty O'Keefe
- HMS Actif
- HMS Aglaia
- HMS Alexander (1796)
- HMS Anaconda
- HMS Anacreon (1799)
- HMS Anglesea (1694)
- HMS Antigua (1804)
- HMS Arab (1798)
- HMS Argus (1799)
- HMS Assiduous
- HMS Atalanta (1814)
- HMS Avenger (1794)
- HMS Barbadoes (1804)
- HMS Barbara (1806)
- HMS Barbuda (1780)
- HMS Barracouta (1782)
- HMS Bellona (1806)
- HMS Berbice (1793)
- HMS Bonetta (1798)
- HMS Bounty
- HMS Brazen (1798)
- HMS Bustler (1782)
- HMS Cambrian (1797)
- HMS Canso (1813)
- HMS Carrier
- HMS Charlotte (1798)
- HMS Columbia (1812)
- HMS Cormorant (1781)
- HMS Defender (1809)
- HMS Demerara (1806)
- HMS Deux Amis
- HMS Diligent (1813)
- HMS Dolphin (1813)
- HMS Dolphins Prize
- HMS Dominica (1807)
- HMS Dominica (1810)
- HMS Duc de la Vauginon
- HMS Duguay-Trouin (1780)
- HMS Elizabeth (1805)
- HMS Epervier (1797)
- HMS Epervier (1812)
- HMS Esperance (1795)
- HMS Eugenie (1797)
- HMS Fantome (1810)
- HMS Fleur de la Mer
- HMS Flying Fish (1803)
- HMS Forward (1855)
- HMS Garland (1800)
- HMS Gibraltar Prize
- HMS Grecian (1814)
- HMS Greenwich (1778)
- HMS Grenada (1804)
- HMS Guachapin
- HMS Halifax (1797)
- HMS Hardi (1797)
- HMS Hart (1805)
- HMS Harwich (1695)
- HMS Hawk (1803)
- HMS Hazard's Prize
- HMS Hermione (1782)
- HMS Heureux (1800)
- HMS Highflyer (1813)
- HMS Hirondelle
- HMS Hobart
- HMS Hyaena (1778)
- HMS Imogen (1800)
- HMS Isis (1819)
- HMS Keppel (1778)
- HMS Lacedemonian (1796)
- HMS Leander (1813)
- HMS Linnet (1806)
- HMS Lion (1823)
- HMS Macedonian
- HMS Magnet (1809)
- HMS Magpie (1826)
- HMS Maria (1805)
- HMS Marquis de Seignelay
- HMS Matilda (1805)
- HMS Mentor (1781)
- HMS Monsieur (1780)
- HMS Morgiana (1800)
- HMS Morne Fortunee (1803)
- HMS Morne Fortunee (1806)
- HMS Morne Fortunee (1808)
- HMS Mosambique
- HMS Mosquidobit
- HMS Moucheron
- HMS Muros (1806)
- HMS Musquito (1794)
- HMS Musquito (1798)
- HMS Musquito (1799)
- HMS Netley (1798)
- HMS Nova Scotia
- HMS Orestes (1781)
- HMS Pandora (1779)
- HMS Pearl (1708)
- HMS Pearl (1855)
- HMS Pert (1804)
- HMS Phipps
- HMS Phoenix (1694)
- HMS Pictou (1813)
- HMS Pictou (1814)
- HMS Pocahontas
- HMS Polecat
- HMS Port Royal (1796)
- HMS Poulette (1799)
- HMS Prevost (1803)
- HMS Pultusk
- HMS Pylades (1781)
- HMS Rattlesnake (1822)
- HMS Redbridge (1803)
- HMS Renard (1797)
- HMS Renegade
- HMS Revenge (1741)
- HMS Rosario (1800)
- HMS Ruby Prize
- HMS Saint Christopher (1806)
- HMS Scarborough (1711)
- HMS Seaforth
- HMS Shelburne (1813)
- HMS Skipjack (1808)
- HMS Sparrow (1796)
- HMS Speedwell (1815)
- HMS Spencer (1795)
- HMS Spey (1814)
- HMS Spider (1782)
- HMS Spitfire (1793)
- HMS Spy (1756)
- HMS St Lawrence (1813)
- HMS Superieure
- HMS Swaggerer
- HMS Swallow (1703)
- HMS Swallow (1795)
- HMS Telegraph (1813)
- HMS Trepassey (1779)
- HMS Trimmer
- HMS Trompeuse (1799)
- HMS Trompeuse (1800)
- HMS Union (1823)
- HMS Unique (1804)
- HMS Utile (1799)
- HMS Vengeance (1758)
- HMS Venturer (1807)
- HMS Victoire (1797)
- HMS Vincejo
- HMS Viper (1777)
- HMS Wasp (1800)
- HMS Zebra (1815)
- Hold That Hypnotist
- Honor Among Enemies
- Hook (film)
- Hook Gang
- Hope (1792 ship)
- Horace Bell
- Horror Island
- Horizon-1
- Hostis humani generis
- Hot Pursuit (1987 film)
- Houshou Marine
- Howell Davis
- Huang Bamei
- Huevitos congelados
- Hugh Crow
- Hugh Despenser the Younger
- Hugh Hill (privateer)
- Human, Space, Time and Human
- Humehume
- Humphrey Gilbert
- Hurricane Island
- Hussar (1812 ship)
- Hyder Ally (1814 ship)
- Hyenas (video game)

== I ==
- I'm Invincible
- I'm Still Here (Jim's Theme)
- Iberian capture of Providencia
- Ice Age: Continental Drift
- Ignatius Pell
- Iguana (film)
- Il pirata
- Ilsley (ship)
- Imaginary Lives
- Indian Ocean slave trade
- Ingela Gathenhielm
- In Search of Santa
- INS Mysore (D60)
- INS Tabar
- Integrated Coastal Surveillance System
- International piracy law
- International Talk Like a Pirate Day
- In the Belly of the Bloodhound
- In the Wake of the Bounty
- Invention for Destruction
- Invincible Napoleon (1804 ship)
- Ioannis Varvakis
- I predatori delle Antille
- Iquan's Party
- Ira Allen
- Irene incident
- Irlam (1800 ship)
- Ironwolf
- Isaac Chauncey
- Isaac H. Duval
- Isaac Hull
- Isaac Rochussen
- Isaac Sears
- Isla de la Juventud
- Isla de Mona
- Israel Hands
- Israel Pellew
- Italian Military Support Base in Djibouti
- Izydor Borowski
- Île-à-Vache

== J ==
- J-Stars Victory VS
- J. M. Chapman
- Jack Plank Tells Tales
- Jack Sparrow
- Jack Ward
- Jacob Collaert
- Jacob Evertson
- Jacob Fackman
- Jacob Hall (pirate)
- Jacob Jones (naval officer)
- Jacob Nagle
- Jacob Pettersson Degenaar
- Jacob Willekens
- Jacque Alexander Tardy
- Jacques Cassard
- Jacques Colaert
- Jacques de Sores
- Jacques François Perroud
- Jacques Tavernier
- Jacquotte Delahaye
- Jake and the Never Land Pirates
- Jamaica Inn (film)
- Jamaica Inn (novel)
- Jamaica Station (Royal Navy)
- James Alday
- James Allison (pirate)
- James Biddle
- James Brisbane
- James Brooke
- James Browne (pirate)
- James Carnegie (pirate)
- James Copeland (outlaw)
- James DeWolf
- James Fife
- James Ford (pirate)
- James Forten
- James Jakob Williams
- James Kelly (crimper)
- James Kelly (pirate)
- James Kirker
- James Lancaster
- James Lawrence
- James Littleton
- James Long (filibuster)
- James M. Elam
- James Macrae
- James Monroe (New York politician)
- James Morrison (mutineer)
- James Plaintain
- James R. Caldwell
- James Reiskimmer
- James Robinson (soldier, born 1753)
- James Skyrme
- James Weatherhill
- James Wimble
- Jan de Bouff
- Jan Erasmus Reyning
- Jan Jacobsen (English service)
- Jan Jacobsen
- Jan Janszoon van Hoorn's expedition of 1633
- Jan Janszoon
- Jan Jansz Weltevree
- Jan Lichthart
- Jan Mendoses
- Jan van Ryen
- Jan Willems (Dutch buccaneer)
- Jared Irwin (Pennsylvania politician)
- Jasim bin Jabir
- Jasper Seagar
- Jay Bahadur
- Jean-Baptiste-François Bompart
- Jean-Baptiste du Casse
- Jean-Baptiste Mac Nemara
- Jean-François Duclerc
- Jean-François Hodoul
- Jean-François Roberval
- Jean-Joseph Roux
- Jean-Marie Dutertre
- Jean Ango
- Jean Baptiste Guedry
- Jean Bart (1807 ship)
- Jean Bart
- Jean Bernanos
- Jean Bonadvis
- Jean Bontemps
- Jean Charpin
- Jean Fantin
- Jean Fleury
- Jean Gaspard de Vence
- Jean Hamlin
- Jean L'Escuyer
- Jean Lafitte National Historical Park and Preserve
- Jean Lafitte
- Jeanne de Clisson
- Jeanne Lanternier
- Jean Rose
- Jean Thomas Dulaien
- Jean Tristan (pirate)
- Jean Vrolicq
- Jefferson Davis (privateer)
- Jeffrey Hudson
- Jelles de Lecat
- Jens Lind (businessman)
- Jerome Gratian
- Jeronimus Cornelisz
- Jesse Elliott
- Jewish pirates
- Jiajing wokou raids
- Jim Hawkins (character)
- Jim Hawkins and the Curse of Treasure Island
- Joe Cool murders
- Johanna Hård
- John A. Quitman
- John Adams (mutineer)
- John Ashley (bandit)
- John Auger
- John B. Nicolson
- John Baptist Collins
- John Bear (pirate)
- John Benbow
- John Bowen (pirate)
- John Breholt
- John Bull (1799 ship)
- John Bull (1800 ship)
- John Burgh (officer)
- John Callis (pirate)
- John Carnes
- John Chudleigh (MP for Lostwithiel)
- John Clipperton
- John Cockram
- John Cole (pirate)
- John Cook (pirate)
- John Cornelius (pirate)
- John Coxon (pirate)
- John Crabbe (died 1352)
- John D. Henley
- John Davis (explorer)
- John de lo Cavo
- John Derdrake
- John Downes (naval officer)
- John Drake (privateer)
- John Eaton (pirate)
- John Evans (pirate)
- John Fenn (pirate)
- John Glover (general)
- John Golden (pirate)
- John Goodrich (Loyalist)
- John Gow
- John Graham (pirate)
- John H. Dent
- John Halsey (privateer)
- John Ham (pirate)
- John Harvey Stevens
- John Hawkins (naval commander)
- John Hawley (died 1408)
- John Hippisley (Parliamentarian)
- John Hoar (pirate)
- John Houston McIntosh
- John Ireland (pirate)
- John James (pirate)
- John Julian
- John Killigrew (died 1584)
- John King (pirate)
- John Leadstone
- John Macferson
- John Macpherson (privateer)
- John Martel (pirate)
- John Mason (colonist)
- John Massey (pirate)
- John Moore (Manx poet)
- John Morris (pirate)
- John Mucknell
- John Murrell (bandit)
- John Narborough
- John Newland Maffitt (privateer)
- John Noble (privateer)
- John Norcross
- John Nutt
- Johnny Poe
- John Ordronaux (privateer)
- John Oxenham
- John Pender Paynter
- John Phillips (pirate)
- John Prie
- John Pro
- John Quamino
- John Quelch (pirate)
- John Rackham
- John Randolph Grymes
- John Rawleigh Jackson
- John Read (pirate)
- John Rivers (pirate)
- John Rodgers (naval officer, born 1772)
- John Rous
- John Russell (pirate)
- John S. Montmollin
- John Selman (privateer)
- John Smith (United States Navy officer)
- John Swann (pirate)
- John Thurber
- John Trippe
- John Vidal
- John Walter Roberts
- John Watling
- John West (pirate)
- John Willes-Johnson
- John Yarnall
- John Yates Beall
- Jolanda, the Daughter of the Black Corsair
- Jolly Roger: Massacre at Cutter's Cove
- Jolly Roger
- Jonah: A VeggieTales Movie
- Jonas Lambert-Wenman
- Jonathan Barnet
- Jonathan Haraden
- Jonathan Meredith
- Jonathan Plowman Jr.
- Jonathan Thorn
- Joost van Dyk
- Jordan Goudreau
- Joseph Baker (pirate)
- Joseph Bannister
- Joseph Barss (privateer)
- Joseph Bradish
- Joseph Bradley (buccaneer)
- Joseph Broussard
- Joseph Cooper (pirate)
- Joseph Dugas (merchant)
- Joseph Faro
- Joseph Gayles
- Joseph Kelly (crimper)
- Joseph Olney
- Joseph Pallache
- Joseph Potier
- Joseph Tarbell
- Joseph Thompson (pirate)
- Joseph Wheeler (pirate)
- Joshamee Gibbs
- Joshua Barney
- Joshua Huddy
- Josiah Burgess
- Josiah Tattnall III
- José Gaspar
- José Joaquim Almeida
- Juan Corso
- Juanga (ship)
- Juan García (privateer)
- Juan Guartem
- Judar Pasha
- Jules Verne's Mysterious Island (2012 film)
- Julienne David
- Julius Caesar Against the Pirates
- Julius Caesar
- July 2025 Gaza Freedom Flotilla
- Jump Force
- Jump Super Stars
- Jump Ultimate Stars
- June 2025 Gaza Freedom Flotilla
- Junk (ship)
- Junkung
- Jørgen Jørgensen

== K ==
- KA Bunga Mas Lima
- Kaizoku Sentai Gokaiger
- Kakap (boat)
- Kaleem Shaukat
- Kamen/Mirai Kōkai
- Kanakes
- Kanhoji Angre
- Kanjar Ro
- Karamanli dynasty
- Kazimierz Lux
- KD Sri Indera Sakti
- Keelhauling
- Keeping Up with the Kalashnikovs
- Kemal Reis
- Kenelm Digby
- Ketch
- Khoja Zufar
- Kidd the Pirate
- Kidnapped to Mystery Island
- Kid Shanahan
- King David's Spaceship
- King Grey (1786 ship)
- King K. Rool
- King Neptune (film)
- King of Alcatraz
- Kitty (1800 ship)
- Kitty (1810 ship)
- Klaus Störtebeker
- Klein Henszlein
- Koisuru One Piece
- Korn's Groovy Pirate Ghost Mystery
- Kristoffer Throndsen
- Kuraman Island
- Kurtoğlu Muslihiddin Reis

== L ==
- L'italiana in Algeri
- La Amistad
- Labou
- Lady Franklin (barque)
- Lafitte's Blacksmith Shop
- Lai Choi San
- La isla misteriosa y el capitán Nemo
- Laju incident
- Lalla Aisha Mubarka
- Lalla Balqis
- Lambros Katsonis
- Lancang (ship)
- Lancelot Blackburne
- Lanong
- Lars Bache
- Lars Gathenhielm
- Last Exile
- Last of the Buccaneers
- La tigre è ancora viva: Sandokan alla riscossa!
- Laura Upthegrove
- Laurel (1790 ship)
- Laurens de Graaf
- Lawrence (schooner)
- Lawrence Prince
- Le Corsaire
- Le Ponant
- Le Vieux Nick et Barbe-Noire
- Lego Pirates of the Caribbean: The Video Game
- Lego Pirates of the Caribbean
- Lego Pirates
- Lego Scooby-Doo! Blowout Beach Bash
- Leigh Ashworth
- Leirum Phee
- Lenaert Jansz de Graeff
- Leo of Tripoli
- Letter of marque
- Lewis Ferdinando
- Lewis Scot
- Lewis Warrington (United States Navy officer)
- Lex Gabinia de piratis persequendis
- Liana's Ransom
- Liang Daoming
- Libertalia
- Licario
- Li Dan (magnate)
- Lieutenant Richards (pirate)
- Li Jun (Water Margin)
- Lika Ceni
- Lilandra Neramani
- Lillibullero
- Limahong
- Limberakis Gerakaris
- Lin Daoqian
- Link-Busters
- Lion (1809 ship)
- Lionel Wafer
- List of black flags
- List of Black Lagoon chapters
- List of Black Lagoon characters
- List of Black Lagoon episodes
- List of fictional pirates
- List of French privateers named for Napoleon Bonaparte
- List of One Piece chapters (1–186)
- List of One Piece chapters (187–388)
- List of One Piece chapters (389–594)
- List of One Piece chapters (595–806)
- List of One Piece chapters (807–1015)
- List of One Piece chapters (1016–current)
- List of One Piece characters
- List of One Piece episodes
- List of One Piece episodes (seasons 1–8)
- List of One Piece episodes (seasons 9–14)
- List of One Piece episodes (seasons 15–19)
- List of One Piece episodes (seasons 20–present)
- List of One Piece films
- List of One Piece manga volumes
- List of One Piece media
- List of One Piece television specials
- List of One Piece video games
- List of pirate films and television series
- List of Pirates of the Caribbean characters
- List of pirates
- List of privateers
- List of ships attacked by Nigerian pirates
- List of ships attacked by Somali pirates in 2008
- List of ships attacked by Somali pirates in 2009
- List of ships attacked by Somali pirates in 2010
- List of ships attacked by Somali pirates in 2011
- List of ships attacked by Somali pirates in 2012
- List of ships attacked by Somali pirates
- List of space pirates
- List of TaleSpin characters
- List of Terry and the Pirates comic strips
- Lists of One Piece chapters
- Little Thatch
- Liverpool (privateer)
- Liverpool Packet
- Lizard (1814 ship)
- Lo Hon-cho
- London Somalia Conference
- Long John Peter
- Long John Silver's
- Long John Silver (comics)
- Long John Silver (film)
- Long John Silver
- Long rifle
- Lootere (TV series)
- Lope de Aguirre
- Lopez Expedition
- Lorcha (boat)
- Lord Archibald Hamilton
- Lord Hawke (1798 ship)
- Lording Barry
- Lord Jim (1925 film)
- Lost Man/Sailing Day
- Louis-Michel Aury
- Louisa (Quasi-War privateer)
- Louis de Boisot
- Louis Guittar
- Louis Le Golif
- Lucky Starr and the Pirates of the Asteroids
- Lucretia Jans
- Luffy's Peak - Attained! Fifth Gear
- Luis Fajardo (Spanish Navy officer)
- Lundy
- Lun Guili

== M ==
- Mad Jack the Pirate
- Madre de Deus
- Maersk Alabama hijacking
- Magic Island (film)
- Magister Wigbold
- Magnus Heinason
- Major D'Aquin's Battalion of Free Men of Color
- Major Penner
- Malartic (1799 ship)
- Malcolm Reynolds
- Malouin (1803 ship)
- Malvina (1807 ship)
- Manchua
- Manhunt of Mystery Island
- Mansel Alcantra
- Mantis (Marvel Cinematic Universe)
- Manuel Ribeiro Pardal
- Mara Jade
- Marcus Antonius Creticus
- Marcus Berg (writer)
- Marie of the Isles
- Marines' Hymn
- Marinos Kontaras
- Maritime Security Patrol Area
- Maritime Security Regimes
- Mark Anthony DeWolf
- Marooning
- Marthe Franceschini
- Martin Frobisher
- Mary Bryant
- Mary Critchett
- Mary Ormond
- Mary Read (play)
- Mary Read
- Mary Wolverston
- Mashouda
- Massacre at Matanzas Inlet
- Masters of the Sea (film)
- Matelotage
- Mathurin Desmarestz
- Matsura Takanobu
- Matthew Lawler
- Matthew Luke
- Matusalem (film)
- Mayhew Folger
- Maz Kanata
- Mediterranean pass
- Mediterranean Squadron (United States)
- Mehdya, Morocco
- Meir Ashkenazi (merchant)
- Mekong River massacre
- Men Against the Sea
- Mentor (1778 ship)
- Merck toch hoe sterck
- Mezzomorto
- Michael Antoine Garoutte
- Michael Geare
- Michael Rudolph
- Michel de Grammont
- Michel Dubocage
- Michel Jacobsen
- Michel le Basque
- Michiel Andrieszoon
- Miguel Enríquez's corsair fleet
- Miguel Enríquez (privateer)
- Milton Caniff
- Minerva (1805 whaler)
- Mir Ali Beg
- Missee Lee
- Mission San Juan Capistrano (California)
- Mississippi Jack
- Mistico (boat)
- Mistress of the Seas
- Mitromaras
- Mocha Island
- Modern Pirates
- Mo Guanfu
- Mohamed Abdi Hassan
- Mohawk (1781 ship)
- Monkey D. Luffy
- Mon Oncle Thomas (1793 ship)
- Monsters (manga)
- Montezuma's treasure
- Montgomery (sloop)
- Monticello (privateer)
- Montigny la Palisse
- Moonfleet (film)
- Moop and Dreadly in the Treasure on Bing Bong Island
- Morgan Rattler (1793 ship)
- Morgan the Pirate (film)
- Morning Star (1825 ship)
- Moroccan expedition
- Moroccan seizure of the Betsey
- Moroccan–American Treaty of Friendship
- Moses Cohen Henriques
- Moïse Vauquelin
- Mr. Smee
- MS Melody
- MS Nautica
- MS Stockholm (1946)
- MS Van Heutsz (1926)
- MT Orkim Harmony hijacking
- MT Stolt Valor
- MT Zafirah hijacking
- Mungo Mackay
- Muppet Treasure Island (video game)
- Muppet Treasure Island
- Murad Agha
- Murat Reis the Elder
- Mushulatubbee
- Music of One Piece
- Musketeers of the Sea
- Musket Model 1777
- Mustafa Bayram
- Mutiny on the Bounty (1935 film)
- Mutiny on the Bounty (1962 film)
- Mutiny on the Bounty (novel)
- Mutiny on the Bounty (radio serial)
- Mutiny on the Bounty
- Mutiny on the Bunny
- Mutiny on the Ethel
- Mutiny
- MV Abdullah
- MV Al Marjan
- MV Almezaan
- MV Arctic Sea
- MV Asian Glory
- MV Beluga Nomination incident
- MV Biscaglia
- MV Danica White
- MV Delight
- MV Faina
- MV Farah III
- MV Feisty Gas
- MV Golden Nori
- MV Guanabara
- MV Hansa Stavanger
- MV Iceberg 1
- MV Iran Deyanat
- MV Irene SL
- MV Izumi
- MV Karagöl
- MV Kota Wajar
- MV Liberty Sun
- MV Moscow University hijacking
- MV Moscow University
- MV Pacific Opal
- MV Ping Shin 101 killings
- MV Powerful
- MV Qana
- MV Safmarine Asia
- MV Samho Dream
- MV Samho Jewelry
- MV Sinar Kudus hijacking
- MV Sirius Star
- MV Stolt Strength
- MV S Venus
- MV Tygra
- MV Yasa Neslihan
- MV Yasin C
- MV York
- MV Zhenhua 4
- My Bonny Light Horseman
- Mysterious Island (1941 film)
- Mysterious Island (1961 film)
- Mysterious Island (2005 film)
- Mysterious Island (serial)

== N ==
- N. C. Trowbridge
- N. C. Wyeth
- Naked/Fight Together/Tempest
- Nami (One Piece)
- Narciso López
- Narentines
- Nassau (1819 ship)
- Nassau, Bahamas
- Nathaniel Burches
- Nathaniel Butler
- Nathaniel Gordon
- Nathaniel Grubing
- Nathaniel Mist
- Nathaniel North
- Nathaniel Reynolds
- Naughty Marietta (film)
- Naughty Marietta (operetta)
- Naw Kham
- Neahkahnie Mountain
- Neapolitan ship Vesuvio
- Nebula (character)
- Nebula (Marvel Cinematic Universe)
- Necker (1779 ship)
- Nemuritorii
- Neverland (film)
- Neverland (miniseries)
- New Genesis (song)
- New Providence
- Ng Akew
- Nicholas Brown (pirate)
- Nicholas Clough
- Nicholas de Concepcion
- Nicholas Lawes
- Nicholas Trott
- Nicholas van Hoorn
- Nicholas Woodall
- Nicholson Broughton
- Nicolas Brigaut
- Nicolas Surcouf
- Nico Robin
- Nile (1802 ship)
- Nimble (1813 ship)
- Ningpo massacre
- Noah Stoddard
- No Gold for a Dead Diver
- No purchase, no pay
- Norfolk (1800 ship)
- Norfolk Island convict mutinies
- Norman Island
- Noroît (film)
- North Star affair
- Noshima Murakami
- Nosy Boraha
- Nyon Conference

== O ==
- Oak Island mystery
- Oak Island
- Occhiali
- Offences at Sea Act 1536
- Offences at Sea Act 1799
- Ohama Kagetaka
- Oiseau (1797 privateer)
- Olav Nilsson
- Old Ironsides (film)
- Old Noll (1743 ship)
- Old Roger (Jolly Roger)
- Olivier Levasseur
- Olivier van Noort
- Ompong Galapong: May Ulo, Walang Tapon
- Once Upon a Time season 4
- Once Upon a Time season 6
- Once Upon a Time season 7
- One Hundred Years Ahead
- One Piece (1999 TV series)
- One Piece (2023 soundtrack)
- One Piece (2023 TV series)
- One Piece (film)
- Onepiece (single volume)
- One Piece (video game)
- One Piece: Baron Omatsuri and the Secret Island
- One Piece: Become the Pirate King!
- One Piece: Burning Blood
- One Piece: Grand Adventure
- One Piece: Grand Battle!
- One Piece: Heroines
- One Piece: Pirates' Carnival
- One Piece: Pirate Warriors (video game)
- One Piece: Pirate Warriors 2
- One Piece: Pirate Warriors 3
- One Piece: Pirate Warriors 4
- One Piece: Pirate Warriors
- One Piece: Romance Dawn
- One Piece: Stampede
- One Piece: The Cursed Holy Sword
- One Piece: Unlimited Adventure
- One Piece: Unlimited Cruise
- One Piece: Unlimited World Red
- One Piece: World Seeker
- One Piece Bounty Rush
- One Piece Film: Gold
- One Piece Film: Red
- One Piece Film: Strong World
- One Piece Film: Z
- One Piece Grand Collection
- One Piece Movie: The Desert Princess and the Pirates: Adventures in Alabasta
- One Piece Odyssey
- One Piece season 1
- One Piece season 2
- One Piece season 3
- One Piece season 4
- One Piece season 5
- One Piece season 6
- One Piece season 7
- One Piece season 8
- One Piece season 9
- One Piece season 10
- One Piece season 11
- One Piece season 12
- One Piece season 13
- One Piece season 14
- One Piece season 15
- One Piece season 16
- One Piece season 17
- One Piece season 18
- One Piece season 19
- One Piece season 20
- One Piece season 21
- One Piece The Movie: Dead End no Bōken
- One Piece Treasure Cruise
- One Piece
- On Stranger Tides
- Operation Allied Protector
- Operation Atalanta
- Operation Dawn 8: Gulf of Aden
- Operation Dawn of Gulf of Aden
- Operation Enduring Freedom – Horn of Africa
- Operation Ocean Shield
- Operation Umeed-e-Nuh
- Orkneyinga saga
- OS35 (bulk carrier)
- Otway (1800 ship)
- Otway Burns
- Our Flag Means Death
- Overboard (comic strip)
- Oyster pirate
- Oyster Wars
- Ozy and Millie
- Ólafur Egilsson

== P ==
- Pablo García Menocal
- Pan (2015 film)
- Panares
- Paris Declaration Respecting Maritime Law
- Parker H. French
- Patsy Conroy Gang
- Patsy Conroy
- Paul Andreas Kaald
- Paul Beneke
- Paul Burchill
- Paul Paddick
- Paulsgrave Williams
- PCO (wrestler)
- Pedro de la Plesa
- Pedro Gilbert
- Pedro Menéndez de Avilés
- Pedro Téllez-Girón, 3rd Duke of Osuna
- Pedro Ñancúpel
- Peg leg
- Pencalang
- Penjajap
- Pepito (comics)
- Perils of the Wild
- Pero Niño
- Perseverance (1797 ship)
- Perseverance (1801 whaling ship)
- Persian Gulf campaign of 1809
- Persian Gulf campaign of 1819
- Peter Alston
- Peter and Wendy (film)
- Peter de Neumann
- Peter Easton
- Peter Harris (buccaneer)
- Peter Heywood
- Peter Johnson (pirate)
- Peter Lawrence (pirate)
- Peter Le Barbier Duplessis
- Peter Love
- Peter Pan & the Pirates
- Peter Pan & Wendy (film)
- Peter Pan's Neverland Nightmare
- Peter Pan (1924 film)
- Peter Pan (1953 film)
- Peter Pan (1976 musical)
- Peter Pan (1988 film)
- Peter Pan (2003 film)
- Peter Pan (play and novel)
- Peter Pan: The Animated Series
- Peter Pan Live!
- Peter Perchard
- Peter Quill (Marvel Cinematic Universe)
- Peter Roderigo
- Peter the Pirate
- Peter Wallace (buccaneer)
- Petit-Goâve
- Petro-piracy in the Gulf of Guinea
- Petrol piracy
- Petros Lantzas
- Philip Alston (counterfeiter)
- Philip Fitzgerald (pirate)
- Philip Lyne
- Philip Nolan (Texas trader)
- Philippe Bequel
- Philip Roche (pirate)
- Phineas Bunce
- Phoenix (1809 ship)
- Pieces of Eight (1985 musical)
- Pier Gerlofs Donia
- Pierre Belain d'Esnambuc
- Pierre-Édouard Plucket
- Pierre Francois
- Pierre François Étienne Bouvet de Maisonneuve
- Pierre Jean Van Stabel
- Pierre Lafitte
- Pierre le Grand (pirate)
- Pierre le Picard
- Pierre Maisonnat dit Baptiste
- Pierre Morpain
- Piers Griffith
- Pieter Ita
- Pieter Schouten
- Piet Pieterszoon Hein
- Piet Piraat
- Pietro Bianco
- Pietro Gelalich
- Pillage of Sigtuna
- Pinas (ship)
- Pink (ship)
- Pippi in the South Seas (film)
- Piracy (comics)
- Piracy Act 1670
- Piracy Act 1698
- Piracy Act 1717
- Piracy Act 1721
- Piracy Act 1837
- Piracy Act 1850
- Piracy Act
- Piracy and armed robbery in the Singapore Strait
- Piracy around the Horn of Africa
- Piracy in Indonesia
- Piracy in Scotland
- Piracy in the 21st century
- Piracy in the Atlantic World
- Piracy in the British Virgin Islands
- Piracy in the Caribbean
- Piracy in the Gulf of Guinea
- Piracy in the Persian Gulf
- Piracy in the Strait of Malacca
- Piracy in the Sulu and Celebes Seas
- Piracy in Venezuela
- Piracy kidnappings
- Piracy networks in Nigeria
- Piracy off the coast of Somalia
- Piracy on Falcon Lake
- Piracy on Lake Nicaragua
- Piracy
- Piratas
- Pirate's Passage
- Pirate code
- Pirate Diary
- Pirate Enlightenment
- Pirate Freedom
- Pirate Gold (1913 film)
- Pirate Gold (1920 serial)
- Pirate haven
- Pirate Hunters
- Pirate Islands
- Pirate Latitudes
- Pirate metal
- Pirate of the Half Moon
- Pirateology: A Pirate Hunter's Companion
- Pirate Parrot
- Pirate Round
- Pirates' House
- Pirates (1986 film)
- Pirates (2005 film)
- Pirates (TV series)
- Pirates: Captain's Quest
- Pirates: The Legend of Black Kat
- Pirates Down the Street
- Pirate ship (ride)
- Pirates II: Stagnetti's Revenge
- Pirates in Callao
- Pirates in Oz
- Pirates in the arts and popular culture
- Pirates Island
- Pirates of Malaya
- Pirates of Malaysia
- Pirates of the 20th Century
- Pirates of the Burning Sea
- Pirates of the Caribbean (attraction)
- Pirates of the Caribbean (film series)
- Pirates of the Caribbean: At World's End
- Pirates of the Caribbean: Dead Man's Chest
- Pirates of the Caribbean: Dead Men Tell No Tales
- Pirates of the Caribbean: Jack Sparrow
- Pirates of the Caribbean: Legends of the Brethren Court
- Pirates of the Caribbean: On Stranger Tides
- Pirates of the Caribbean: The Curse of the Black Pearl
- Pirates of the Caribbean: The Price of Freedom
- Pirates of the Caribbean
- Pirates of the Coast
- Pirates of the High Seas
- Pirates of the Plain
- Pirates of the Sea
- Pirates of the South China Coast
- Pirates of Tortuga
- Pirates of Treasure Island
- Pirates of Tripoli
- Pirate studies
- Pirates versus Ninjas
- Pirates World
- Pirate Treasure
- Pirate utopia
- Piratical Ships Act 1825
- Pitcairn's Island (novel)
- Pitcairn (play)
- Pitcairn Islanders
- Pitcairn Islands
- Plunderathon
- Poisson Volant
- Pokémon Ranger and the Temple of the Sea
- Polacca
- Polly (opera)
- Polly and the Pirates
- Pompey
- Ponsonby (1796 ship)
- Popeye (film)
- Porco Rosso
- Port au Prince (1790 ship)
- Port Royal
- Port Sinister
- Premier Consul (1800)
- Presley O'Bannon
- Pretty Lass (1803 ship)
- Pride of Baltimore
- Prince de Neufchatel
- Prince of Pirates
- Prince of Wales (1786 ship)
- Prince Rupert of the Rhine
- Princess Belle-Etoile
- Princess Sela
- Princess Zelda
- Priso a Doo
- Privateer
- Project A (film)
- Project A-ko: Gray Side/Blue Side
- Project A Part II
- Proposals for concerted operation among the powers at war with the Pyratical states of Barbary
- Puff the Magic Dragon (TV special)
- Pugsey Hurley
- Punta Arenas
- Pushmataha

== Q ==
- Quaker (1781 ship)
- Quatre frères
- Quedagh Merchant
- Queen Anne's Revenge
- Queen Charlotte (1781 ship)
- Queen Emeraldas
- Queen of the Pirates
- Queen of the Seas
- Queens of Langkasuka
- Quest for a Throne
- Quibéron mutinies
- Quicksilver (Stephenson novel)
- Qurnah disaster

== R ==
- R. C. Harvey
- Rachel Wall
- Rage of the Buccaneers
- Raggedy Ann & Andy: A Musical Adventure
- Rahmah ibn Jabir al-Jalhami
- Raiders of the Seven Seas
- Raid on Annapolis Royal (1781)
- Raid on Canso (1776)
- Raid on Cartagena (1683)
- Raid on Ceriale and Borghetto
- Raid on Charlottetown (1775)
- Raid on Mosta
- Raid on Penzance
- Raid on Saint John
- Raid on the Bay of Naples (1544)
- Raid on Yarmouth, Nova Scotia (1775)
- Ralph Izard (naval officer)
- Ralph Stout
- Rambler (1813 ship)
- Raphael Semmes
- Rapture of the Deep (novel)
- Ratchet & Clank Future: Quest for Booty
- Raveneau de Lussan
- Raza Longknife
- Raïs Hamidou
- Read Elding
- Real Felipe Fortress
- Reaper (schooner)
- Reap the Wild Wind
- Redbeard (comics)
- Red Gold (film)
- Red Legs Greaves
- Red Rackham's Treasure
- Red Rovers
- Red Seas Under Red Skies
- Red Wolf (film)
- Regional Cooperation Agreement on Combating Piracy and Armed Robbery against Ships in Asia
- Regnier Tongrelow
- Regulus (1797 ship)
- Renato Beluche
- René Duguay-Trouin
- Reptyl
- Republic of Salé
- Rescue of Jessica Buchanan and Poul Hagen Thisted
- Resolution (1779 ship)
- Resolution (1793 privateer)
- Return to Never Land
- Return to Treasure Island (film)
- Return to Treasure Island (TV series)
- Reuben James
- Reuben Kemper
- Revenge of the Pirates
- Richard Avery Hornsby
- Richard Bobbington
- Richard Coyle (pirate)
- Richard Coyle
- Richard Dale
- Richard Frowd
- Richard Glover (pirate)
- Richard Grenville
- Richard Hawkins
- Richard Henry O'Brien
- Richard Ingle
- Richard Noland
- Richard Sawkins
- Richard Shipton
- Richard Somers
- Richard Taylor (pirate)
- Richard Tookerman
- Richard Want
- Richard Wollaston
- Richard Worley (pirate)
- Riders of the Cactus
- Ridley (Metroid)
- River pirate
- Robert (1793 ship)
- Robert Allison (pirate)
- Robert Colley (pirate)
- Robert Culliford
- Robert Daniell
- Robert Deal (pirate)
- Robert Dudley (explorer)
- Robert Edwards (pirate)
- Robert Glover (pirate)
- Robert Gray (sea captain)
- Robert Henley (naval officer)
- Robert Johnson (governor)
- Robert Lane (pirate)
- Robert Maynard
- Roberto Cofresí in popular culture
- Roberto Cofresí
- Robert Sample
- Robert Searle
- Robert Surcouf de Maisonneuve
- Robert Surcouf
- Robert Walsingham (pirate)
- Robin Hood and the Pirates
- Robinson Crusoe
- Robinson Elsdale
- Robur the Conqueror
- Roche Braziliano
- Rocket (Marvel Cinematic Universe)
- Rocket Robin Hood
- Rockula
- Rodeur (French privateer)
- Rodriguez Canal
- Roger de Flor
- Roger North (governor)
- Román Delgado Chalbaud
- Roronoa Zoro
- Rosses Point Peninsula
- Rossie (1807 ship)
- Rover (1781 ship)
- Rover (privateering ship)
- Royalist (schooner)
- Rudolf Cederström
- Rui Valente
- Rum-running
- Rumahoy
- Rum
- Running Wild (band)
- Rusla
- Réunion

== S ==
- Sacking of Bergen (1393)
- Sack of Baltimore
- Sack of Campeche (1663)
- Sack of Cullera
- Sack of Lanzarote (1586)
- Sack of Lanzarote (1618)
- Sack of Madeira
- Sack of Sori
- Sack of Torreblanca
- Sack of Vieste
- Saddle Ridge Hoard
- Sadie Farrell
- Safe room
- Saffron
- Saint-Malo
- Saint Augustin, Madagascar
- Saints Row: Gat out of Hell
- Saladin (barque)
- Salah Rais
- Salisipan
- Salvador Pirates
- Salé Rovers
- Sam Hawkins, Pirate Detective
- Samrat (1954 film)
- Samson and the Sea Beast
- Samuel Axe
- Samuel Bellamy
- Samuel Burgess
- Samuel Evans (naval officer)
- Samuel Hall Lord
- Samuel Inless
- Samuel Kemper
- Samuel Liddell (pirate)
- Samuel Mason
- Samuel Pallache
- Sandokan
- Sandokan (1976 TV series)
- Sandokan (2025 TV series)
- Sandokan Against the Leopard of Sarawak
- Sandokan the Great (film)
- Sandokan to the Rescue (film)
- Sandokan to the Rescue
- Sanji (One Piece)
- Santa Maria hijacking
- Santiago of the Seas
- Santísima Trinidad (1600s)
- Sappho (1805 ship)
- Sarah (1803 ship)
- Sarah Bishop (hermit)
- Sardam (1628)
- Satan's Sister
- Savage Islands (film)
- Savina Caylyn
- Sayyida al Hurra
- Scalawag (film)
- Scarlet Morning
- Schooner
- Schull
- Scooby-Doo! Pirates Ahoy!
- Scott Cassell
- Sea-King
- Seafarers' Assistance Programme
- Sea Hag
- Sea of Red
- Sea of Thieves
- Second Barbary War
- Second Battle of Tripoli Harbor
- Sefer Reis
- Seizure (Reichs novel)
- Seringapatam (1799 ship)
- Serious Reflections of Robinson Crusoe
- Seven Seas to Calais
- Sextus Pompey
- Shanghaied (SpongeBob SquarePants)
- Shanghaiing
- Shap-ng-tsai
- Shared Awareness and Deconfliction
- Share the World / We Are!
- Sherbrooke (Barbados)
- Sherden
- Shin Takarajima (manga)
- Shintaro Ishihara
- Ship Security Reporting System
- Shipwrecked (1990 film)
- Shirahama Kenki
- Shiver My Timbers
- Shortcut to Happiness
- Shotgun Wedding (2022 film)
- Shuangyu
- Sid Meier's Pirates! (2004 video game)
- Siege of Paris (845)
- Siege of Paris (885–886)
- Silas Royal
- Silas Wheeler
- Silver (Motion novel)
- Simon Fernandes
- Simon Hatley
- Simon Lucas
- Simon Mascarino
- Sinan Reis
- Sinbad: Legend of the Seven Seas
- Sinbad and the Minotaur
- Sinbad the Sailor (1935 film)
- Sinbad the Sailor (1947 film)
- Singing Behind Screens
- Sinking of the Nossa Senhora da Conceição
- Sirens of TI
- Sir Fineen O'Driscoll
- Sir Francis Drake (TV series)
- Sir Francis N. Burton (1825 ship (1))
- Siri och ishavspiraterna
- Sir John Sherbrooke (Halifax)
- Sir John Sherbrooke (Saint John)
- Sister Ping
- Six Days, Seven Nights
- Skipper Clement
- Sklarian Raiders
- Sklavenkasse
- Skull and crossbones
- Sky Pirates of Callisto
- Slave raid of Suðuroy
- Slavery in Africa
- Slaves in Algiers
- Slavic raid on Kungahälla
- Sloop
- Smuggling
- Snake (1808 ship)
- Sol Bianca
- Somers Affair
- Sorcière (privateer)
- Space Pirate Captain Herlock: The Endless Odyssey
- Space Pirate Mito
- Space pirate
- Space Raiders (film)
- Spanish expedition to Balanguingui
- Spanish Main
- Spanish relations with the Barbary Coast
- Spanish treasure fleet
- Spawn of the North
- Speed 2: Cruise Control
- Speronara
- SpongeBob SquarePants: Revenge of the Flying Dutchman
- Spéculateur
- Squire Trelawney
- SS Georgiana
- St. Augustine Pirate & Treasure Museum
- Standoff near St. Christopher
- Star Breeze
- Stardust (2007 film)
- Starfield (video game)
- Starfield: Shattered Space
- Starjammers
- St Dimitri Chapel, Għarb
- Stedcombe (1818 ship)
- Stede Bonnet
- Stenka Razin
- Stephen Decatur
- Stephen Higginson (Continental Congress)
- Stephen Smith (privateer)
- Stockley D. Hays
- Straw Hats' Jolly Roger
- Submerged (2005 film)
- Suds Merrick
- Sulayman Reis
- Super Kabuki II: One Piece
- Surprise (1813 privateer)
- Susan (1813 ship)
- Sussex Camock
- Svend Høra
- Swashbuckler (film)
- Swashbuckler film
- Swim or Sink
- Swiss Family Robinson (1960 film)
- Swivel gun
- Sword of Penitence
- Swords of the Swashbucklers
- SY Quest incident

== T ==
- Tales of a Traveller
- Tales of the Southern Cross
- Talos
- Taphians
- Tara expedition
- Tarleton (1780 Glasgow ship)
- Tartar (1775 ship)
- Tartar (1778 ship)
- Tartar (1780 ship)
- Tartar (1781 ship)
- Tartar (1813 privateer)
- Teazer (privateer)
- Teleboans
- Telmarines
- Tempest Rogers
- Tenchi Muyo! GXP
- Territorial Waters Jurisdiction Act 1878
- Terry and the Pirates (radio serial)
- Terry and the Pirates (serial)
- Terry and the Pirates (TV series)
- Terry and the Pirates
- Teuta
- The Abrafaxe – Under The Black Flag
- The Abyss Surrounds Us
- The Adventurer of Tortuga
- The Adventures of Ben Gunn
- The Adventures of Clint and Mac
- The Adventures of Long John Silver
- The Adventures of Tintin (film)
- The Age of Unreason
- The Air Pirates (film)
- The Amorous Corporal
- The Ancient Art of War at Sea
- The Angel's Command
- The Antelope
- The Archipelago on Fire
- The Ballad of Captain Kidd
- The Baroque Cycle
- The Battle of New Orleans
- The Beautiful Corsair
- The Black Corsair (1937 film)
- The Black Corsair (1976 film)
- The Black Corsair
- The Black Pirates
- The Black Pirate
- The Black Stranger
- The Black Swan (film)
- The Bounty (1984 film)
- The Bounty Trilogy
- The Boy and the Pirates
- The Buccaneer (1938 film)
- The Buccaneer (1958 film)
- The Buccaneers (1956 TV series)
- The Captain and the Kids (film series)
- The Complete Terry and the Pirates
- The Coral Island
- The Count of Monte Cristo
- The Crimson Permanent Assurance
- The Crimson Pirate
- The Curse of Oak Island
- The Curse of the Black Spot
- The Dagger of Kamui
- The Dark Frigate
- The Daughter of the Green Pirate
- The Deerslayer
- The Delightful Rogue
- The Demoniacs
- The Devil's Admiral
- The Devil-Ship Pirates
- The Devil and Daniel Mouse
- The Devil and Daniel Webster (film)
- The Devil and Daniel Webster (opera)
- The Devil and Daniel Webster
- The Devil and Tom Walker
- The Eagle of the Sea
- The Eighth (United States)
- The Eventful History of the Mutiny and Piratical Seizure of HMS Bounty
- The Farther Adventures of Robinson Crusoe
- The First Kiss (1928 American film)
- The Fonz and the Happy Days Gang
- The Fortunes of Captain Blood
- The Freebooter of the Baltic
- The French Atlantic Affair
- The Ghost Galleon
- The Ghost Pirates
- The Gold-Bug
- The Golden Hawk
- The Goonies
- The Great Adventures of Captain Kidd
- The Hand of Robin Squires
- The Hijacking of the Achille Lauro
- The History of Sir Francis Drake
- The Ice Pirates
- The Island (1980 film)
- The Island (Benchley novel)
- The King's Pirate
- The King of the Sea
- The Legend of Captain Jack Sparrow (attraction)
- The Librarian: Curse of the Judas Chalice
- The Life Aquatic with Steve Zissou
- The Light at the Edge of the World
- The Lighthouse at the End of the World
- The Lightship (1963 film)
- The Lightship
- The Lion of St. Mark
- The Little Savage
- The Long Ships
- The Lost Girls (film)
- The Lost Pirate Kingdom
- The Masked Man Against the Pirates
- The Master of Ballantrae (1953 film)
- The Master of Ballantrae (1984 film)
- The Master of Ballantrae
- The Mersey Pirate
- The Mind Robber
- The Misfortunes of Alonso Ramírez
- The Monster Men
- The Mutineers of the Bounty
- The Mutiny of the Bounty
- The Mysterious Island (1929 film)
- The Mysterious Island
- The Mystery of the Black Jungle
- The Mystery of the Sea
- The Mystery of the Third Planet
- The New Gulliver
- The New Swiss Family Robinson
- The Noble Fisherman
- Theodore O'Hara
- Theodorious Paleologus
- Theon Greyjoy
- The Pagemaster
- The Phantom (1996 film)
- The Phantom Ship (film)
- The Pilot: A Tale of the Sea
- The Pirate's Dream
- The Pirate's Gold
- The Pirate (1948 film)
- The Pirate (1973 film)
- The Pirate (novel)
- The Pirate and the Slave Girl
- The Pirate City: An Algerine Tale
- The Pirate Fairy
- The Pirate Movie
- The Pirate of Panama
- The Pirate of the Black Hawk
- The Pirate Planet
- The Pirates! In an Adventure with Scientists!
- The Pirates! In an Adventure with Scientists
- The Pirates!
- The Pirates (2014 film)
- The Pirates: The Last Royal Treasure
- The Pirates of Blood River
- The Pirates of Dark Water
- The Pirates of Malaysia
- The Pirates of Orion
- The Pirates of Penzance (film)
- The Pirates of Penzance
- The Pirates of Somalia (film)
- The Pirates of Somalia
- The Pirates of the Mississippi
- The Pirates Who Don't Do Anything: A VeggieTales Movie
- The Pirate Tapes
- The Piratica Series
- The Princess and the Pirate
- The Princess Bride
- The Princess Bride (novel)
- The Pyrates
- The Red Peri
- The Red Rover
- The Red Scholar's Wake
- The Red Seas
- The Resurrection Casket
- The Return of Captain Nemo
- The Return of Sandokan
- The Road to Romance
- The Rover (1967 film)
- The Sea Beast (2022 film)
- The Sea Hawk (1924 film)
- The Sea Hawk (1940 film)
- The Sea Hawk
- The Sea Hound (serial)
- The Sea of Monsters
- The Sea Pirate
- The Secret of the Black Falcon
- The Secret of the Unicorn
- The Secret of Treasure Island
- The Ship That Never Was
- The Simpsons: Tapped Out
- The Sky Pirate (novel)
- The Son of Captain Blood
- The Son of Sandokan
- The Son of the Red Corsair (1921 film)
- The Son of the Red Corsair (1943 film)
- The Son of the Red Corsair (1959 film)
- The Space Pirates
- The Spanish Main
- The SpongeBob Movie: Sponge Out of Water
- The Story of Doctor Dolittle
- The Stranger and the Gunfighter
- The Swan Princess (film series)
- The Tale of Custard the Dragon
- The Testament of Aga Koppanyi
- The Three Pirates
- The Tigers of Mompracem (film)
- The Tigers of Mompracem
- The Treasure of Barracuda
- The Two Tigers (film)
- The Two Tigers
- The Voyage of the Arctic Tern
- The Wake of the Lorelei Lee
- The War of Greedy Witches
- The Water-Witch
- The Wettest Stories Ever Told
- The Wiggles Movie
- The Women of Pitcairn Island
- The Wonderful Stories of Professor Kitzel
- Thomas Anstis
- Thomas Barrow (pirate)
- Thomas Boyle
- Thomas Brooke alias Cobham
- Thomas Cavendish's circumnavigation
- Thomas Cavendish
- Thomas Cocklyn
- Thomas Collins (pirate)
- Thomas Day (pirate)
- Thomas Dover
- Thomas Egenton Hogg
- Thomas Fraser (Royal Navy officer)
- Thomas Freeman (pirate)
- Thomas Goldsmith (pirate)
- Thomas Green (captain)
- Thomas Griffin (pirate)
- Thomas Hawkins (pirate)
- Thomas Hees
- Thomas Henley (pirate)
- Thomas Howard (pirate)
- Thomas Johnstone
- Thomas Jones (privateer)
- Thomas King (merchant)
- Thomas Larimore
- Thomas Lynch (governor)
- Thomas Macdonough
- Thomas Magott
- Thomas Mostyn (sea captain)
- Thomas Nichols (pirate)
- Thomas Paine (privateer)
- Thomas Paine
- Thomas Pellow
- Thomas Penniston
- Thomas Pound
- Thomas Shirley
- Thomas Sutton (pirate)
- Thomas Sutton
- Thomas Tew
- Thomas Vaughan (pirate)
- Thomas Wake (pirate)
- Thomas Warren (Royal Navy officer)
- Thomas Whetstone
- Thomas White (pirate)
- Thomas Woolerly
- Thongor Fights the Pirates of Tarakus
- Thorfinn (Vinland Saga)
- Three Men in a Cart
- Thugs of Hindostan
- Tia Dalma
- Tiger of the Seven Seas
- Timber pirate
- Timeline of piracy in the Bay of Honduras
- Timeline of piracy
- Timoji
- Timothy Meaher
- Titus Salter
- Tobias Lear
- Toi invasion
- Tokyo One Piece Tower
- Tom and Jerry: Shiver Me Whiskers
- Tom Ayrton
- Tommaso Condulmer
- Tom Souville
- Tony Tony Chopper
- Tortuga
- Toto vs. the Black Pirate
- Tough Boris
- Trans-Saharan slave trade
- Travel Scholarships
- Treasure Island (1918 film)
- Treasure Island (1920 film)
- Treasure Island (1934 film)
- Treasure Island (1938 film)
- Treasure Island (1950 film)
- Treasure Island (1972 film)
- Treasure Island (1973 film)
- Treasure Island (1978 TV series)
- Treasure Island (1982 film)
- Treasure Island (1984 video game)
- Treasure Island (1986 film)
- Treasure Island (1988 film)
- Treasure Island (1990 film)
- Treasure Island (1995 film)
- Treasure Island (1999 film)
- Treasure Island (2012 TV series)
- Treasure Island (play)
- Treasure Island, San Francisco
- Treasure Island Hotel and Casino
- Treasure Island in Outer Space
- Treasure Island
- Treasure map
- Treasure of Lima: A Buried Exhibition
- Treasure of Lima
- Treasure Planet (1982 film)
- Treasure Planet (soundtrack)
- Treasure Planet: Battle at Procyon
- Treasure Planet
- Treasure
- Treaty of Tripoli (1805)
- Treaty of Tripoli
- Treaty with Morocco (1836)
- Treaty with Tunis (1797)
- Treaty with Tunis (1824)
- Treehouse of Horror IV
- Tripoli (film)
- Tripoli, Libya
- Tripoli Monument (sculpture)
- Trompeuse (ship)
- Tropico 2: Pirate Cove
- Truce of Ratisbon
- True Briton (1775 ship)
- True Caribbean Pirates
- Tuanku Abbas
- Tunis
- Turkish Abductions
- Turks in Space
- Turn Joe
- Twenty Thousand Leagues Under the Seas
- Two Lost Worlds

== U ==
- Ulysses Bloodstone
- Under Jolly Roger
- Under Siege
- Under the Jolly Roger
- Under the Seas
- Union Island (1794 ship)
- United Nations Security Council Resolution 1838
- United Nations Security Council Resolution 1918
- United Nations Security Council Resolution 1950
- United Nations Security Council Resolution 1976
- United Nations Security Council Resolution 2018
- United States v. Furlong
- United States v. Jackalow
- United States v. Shi
- United States v. Smith (1820)
- Universal jurisdiction
- Ushkuyniks
- Uskoks
- Usopp
- USRC Alabama
- USRC Commodore Barry
- USRC Jackson
- USRC James Madison
- USRC Louisiana
- USRC Taney
- USS Adams (1799)
- USS Alligator (1820)
- USS Antrim (FFG-20)
- USS Argus (1803)
- USS Ashland (LSD-48)
- USS Carolina (1812)
- USS Chesapeake (1799)
- USS Chippewa (1815)
- USS Congress (1799)
- USS Constellation (1797)
- USS Constitution
- USS Delaware (1776)
- USS Elcano
- USS Enterprise (1799)
- USS Essex (1799)
- USS Ferret (1822)
- USS Firefly
- USS George Washington (1798)
- USS Grampus (1821)
- USS Guerriere (1814)
- USS Herald (1798)
- USS Howard (DDG-83)
- USS Independence (1814)
- USS Intrepid (1798)
- USS Java
- USS John Adams (1799)
- USS Nautilus (1799)
- USS New York (1800)
- USS Nicholas (FFG-47)
- USS Ontario (1813)
- USS Peacock (1813)
- USS Philadelphia (1799)
- USS President (1800)
- USS Rattlesnake (1813)
- USS Retaliation (1798)
- USS Somers (1842)
- USS Spark (1813)
- USS Spitfire (1803)
- USS Spitfire (1814)
- USS Syren (1803)
- USS Thunderbolt
- USS Torch
- USS United States (1797)
- USS Vesuvius (1806)
- USS Vixen (1803)
- USS Wild Cat (1822)
- Usta Murad
- Uta's Songs: One Piece Film Red

== V ==
- Vaan (Final Fantasy)
- Vaas Montenegro
- Valeria (Conan the Barbarian)
- Vampirates: Black Heart
- Vampirates: Blood Captain
- Vampirates: Demons of the Ocean
- Vampirates: Empire of Night
- Vampirates: Tide of Terror
- Vampirates
- Van Tuyl
- Vautour (1797 ship)
- Veborg
- Venetian bombardments of the Beylik of Tunis
- Venus series
- Vicente Benavides
- Victual Brothers
- Vikings
- Vincent de Paul
- Vincent Moulac
- Vincenzo Alessandri
- Vincenzo Gambi
- Virgins of the Seven Seas
- Visby
- Vittoria (1813 ship)
- Vittoria (1813 Whitehaven ship)
- Voyage of Slaves
- Voyage of Terror: The Achille Lauro Affair
- Voyages extraordinaires
- Vulture (1779 ship)

== W ==
- Walking the plank
- Walter Kennedy (pirate)
- Walter Raleigh in popular culture
- Walter Raleigh
- Wanderer (slave ship)
- Wang Zhi (pirate)
- Wanted! Eiichiro Oda Before One Piece
- Wanted (manga)
- Wanton (1797 ship)
- Wario (series)
- Waterworld
- Watts' West Indies and Virginia expedition
- We Are Pirates
- Wendy (film)
- West Indiaman
- West Indies anti-piracy operations of the United States
- West Indies Squadron (United States)
- Westmoreland (1791 ship)
- Westmorland (ship)
- Westward Ho! (novel)
- Wet Gold (1921 film)
- Whaleboat War
- White Lion (privateer)
- White Slave Ship
- Who Finds a Friend Finds a Treasure
- Whydah Gally
- Wiebbe Hayes
- Wijerd Jelckama
- Will (Indian)
- Willem Bloys van Treslong
- William A. Chanler
- William Aleyn
- William Bainbridge
- William Bligh
- William Blount
- William Burke (pirate)
- William Cotter (pirate)
- William Coward (pirate)
- William Dampier
- William Day (sea captain)
- William Death
- William Eaton (soldier)
- William Field Porter
- William Fly
- William Fox (pirate)
- William Furlong Wise
- William Hawkins (died 1589)
- William Herle (spy)
- William Hutchinson (privateer)
- William II de La Marck
- William Jackson (pirate)
- William Josephus Stafford
- William Kidd
- William Knight (pirate)
- William Kyd
- William Lane (died 1618)
- William Lewis (pirate)
- William Logan Crittenden
- William M. Crane
- William May (pirate)
- William Monson (Royal Navy officer)
- William Moody (pirate)
- William Parker (privateer)
- William Peartree
- William Pinckney Rose
- William Read (pirate)
- William Rhett
- William Rous
- William Salesbury (of Rhug)
- William Stephens Smith
- William Walker (filibuster)
- William Ward Burrows II
- William West (Rhode Island politician)
- William Williams (naval officer)
- William Wright (privateer)
- Will Turner
- Wimund
- Wokou
- Women in piracy
- Woodes Rogers
- Wyszak

== X ==
- Xebec

== Y ==
- Yankee Buccaneer
- Yankee Pasha (film)
- Yan Siqi
- Yaron Gottlieb
- Yellowbeard
- Yermak Timofeyevich
- Yona of the Dawn
- Yondu
- Young Ivanhoe
- Young Teazer
- Yuegang
- Yusuf ibn al-Hasan
- Yusuf Karamanli

== Z ==
- Zabra
- Zanzibar (G.I. Joe)
- Zhang Heng (Water Margin)
- Zheng Jing
- Zheng Qi (pirate)
- Zheng Yi (pirate)
- Zheng Yi Sao
- Zheng Zhilong
- Zorro (novel)
- Zymen Danseker

== Templates ==
- Campaignbox Operation Atalanta
- Campaignbox Operation Island Watch
- Campaignbox Operation Ocean Shield
- Captain Blood
- Disney's Peter Pan
- Infobox pirate
- One Piece arcs
- One Piece manga intro
- One Piece
- Peter Pan
- Piracy-stub
- Piracy in Somalia
- Pirate-stub
- Pirates of the Caribbean
- Pirates of the Mississippi
- Pirates of the Modern Age
- Pirates
- Privateer-stub
- Sinbad the Sailor
- The Goonies
- The Pirates of Penzance
- The Pirates
- The Princess Bride
- Treasure Island
