= Rover (ship) =

Several vessels have been named Rover:

- Rover (1781 ship) had been launched in New York, possibly as Judith, or an earlier name. Rover appeared in British records in 1781. She became a privateer and then a slave ship in the triangular trade in enslaved people. An American privateer captured Rover in 1783 on the second leg of her first slave voyage.
- Rover (1786 ship) was launched in 1786 in Poole. She spent her brief career sailing to Newfoundland from England, and returning via Spain, having delivered fish (probably salt cod). In 1793 a French privateer captured her, but a British letter of marque quickly recaptured her. She was lost in 1795 while delivering fish from Newfoundland to Spain.
- Rover was a whaler that between 1830 and 1848 made four voyages to the British southern whale fishery. She was the former Cruizer-class brig-sloop HMS Rover (1808).

== See also ==
- HMS Rover – any one of seven vessels of the Royal Navy
