= Jan Jacobsen (disambiguation) =

Jan Jacobsen may refer to

- Jan Jacobsen, (1588/89–1622) was a Flemish-born privateer, & naval commander in Spanish service
- Jan Jacobsen (English service) (fl. 1660s), Flemish-born privateer in English service
- Jan Jacobsen (archer) (born 1963), Danish archer
