= Thomas Goldsmith (pirate) =

Thomas Goldsmith (died 1714) was a privateer from Dartmouth during the War of Spanish Succession. After serving as a privateer around 1710, he turned to piracy aboard his ship Snap Dragon and accumulated great wealth.

He is chiefly remembered not for his piracy but for retiring and dying peacefully in his bed, to be buried in his hometown churchyard in 1714. His gravestone inscription is:

THOMAS GOLDSMITH
Who died 1714.
He commanded the Snap Dragon, a privateer
Belonging to this port, in the reign of queen Anne,
In which vessel he turn’d pirate,
And amass’d much riches.

Men that are virtuous serve the Lord;
And the Devil's by his friends ador'd;
And as they merit get a place
Amidst the bless'd or hellish race;
Pray then ye learned clergy show
Where can this brute, Tom Goldsmith, go?
Whose life was one continual evil
Striving to cheat God, Man and Devil.

== See also ==
- Queen Anne's War - name for the North American theater of the War of the Spanish Succession.
