= Pirates: Captain's Quest =

1997 video game

- Developer: ImageBuilder Software
- Publisher: Discovery Channel Multimedia
- Platforms: Macintosh, Windows
- Release: April 1997
- Genres: Educational, adventure

Pirates: Captain's Quest is a 1997 educational adventure video game. In Spain the game was published by Zeta Multimedia.

== Plot ==
The game allows the player to experience the life of a pirate with activities such as naval combat, sword fighting, navigation, island conquering, and digging for buried treasure.

== Gameplay ==
Primarily an adventure game (due to requiring players to hunt for items and gather knowledge from characters to complete puzzles), the title contains 47 levels. It also contains minigames in other genres.

== Critical reception ==
Andy Backer of Computer Games Magazine positively compared it to Microprose's similarly themed title Pirates Gold. J.P. Faber of U.S. Kids deemed it "terrifically fun" due to creating a historically authentic atmosphere. Daily Record thought the game would keep kids entertained for hours, while educating them in the process.
