= Sam Hawkins, Pirate Detective =

2003 comedy children's book series

- Author: Ian Billings
- Publisher: Macmillan Children's Books
- Publication date: 2003
- ISBN: 9780330414975

Sam Hawkins, Pirate Detective is a series of comedy children's books by Ian Billings. The first book, Sam Hawkins Pirate Detective and the Case of the Cutglass Cutlass was published by Macmillan Publishers in 2003. The sequel, Sam Hawkins Pirate Detective and the Pointy Head Lighthouse was published in 2004.
