= Wanton (1797 ship) =

History

Great Britain
- Name: Wanton
- Launched: 1797, New Brunswick

General characteristics
- Tons burthen: 84 (bm)
- Sail plan: Schooner
- Complement: 35
- Armament: 8 × 9&4-pounder guns + 6 swivel guns

Wanton was launched in New Brunswick in 1797. She started sailing from Bristol in 1801, trading between the United Kingdom and Africa. After the war with France in 1803 she briefly cruised as a privateer, and made one capture. She then sailed to the West Indies and thereafter apparently traded between the United States and the West Indies.

== Career ==
She arrived at Bristol from Virginia on 9 June 1801. She first appeared in Lloyd's Register in 1801.

Year	Master	Owner	Trade	Source
1801	J.Williams	P.Hunter	Bristol–Africa	LR

Captain Robert Amory acquired a letter of marque on 2 July 1803. On 6 August 1803 a French vessel, prize to Wanton, arrived at Bristol. The French vessel had been sailing from San Domingo when taken. The vessel was Victoire, of 160 tons (bm). (Note: Victoire was offered for sale by auction at Bristol on 12 November 1803. She was 80 ft 6 in (24.5 m) long, with a beam of 23 ft 3 in (7.1 m), and a hold depth of 9 ft 0 in (2.7 m).)

Year	Master	Owner	Trade	Source
1804	J.Williams; J.Hakin	P.Hunter; Peters & Co.	Bristol–Africa; Bristol–Tobago	LR

Wanton, Haken, master, was reported to have been captured while sailing from Tobago to St Vincents. The next issue of Lloyd's List reported that Wanton had arrived at St Vincents. Wanton, Steele, master, was next reported to have arrived at Charleston from St Vincents.

Thereafter Wanton continued to be listed in the registries for some years, but only appeared sporadically in Lloyd's List and trading between the United States and the West Indies.
