= Pietro Bianco =

Albanian pirate and monk

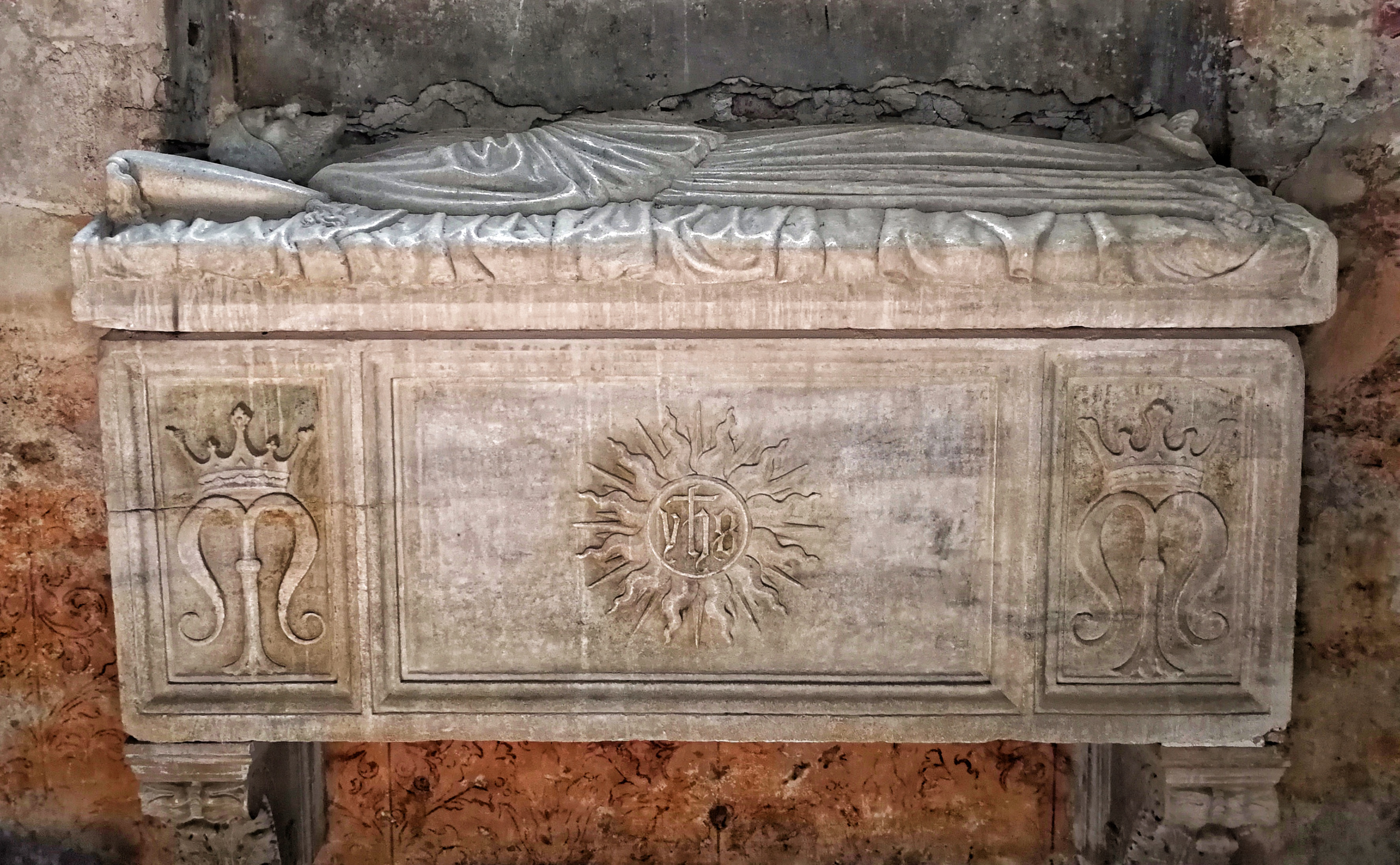
Fornò (Forlì), Sanctuary of Santa Maria delle Grazie, Tomb of Bianco da Durazzo

Pietro Bianco (Albanian: Pjeter Bardhi) was an Albanian pirate from Durrës who lived in the 1450s.

In 1448 he arrived in Forlì, supposedly after his ship sunk. Here he found a local Franciscan monastic movement and joined it.

He chose to repent his sins and built a small oratory in the city named after Santa Maria delle Grazie, known as the Madonna del Pianto or, more popularly, the Celletta dello Zoppo, where he then lived in repentance and devotion, living right in the chapel. He was called ”a hermit dressed in white” since Byzantine monks dressed similarly. It was deconsecrated in 1806 by the French occupants, who sold it to a certain Francesco Romagnoli, who later demolished it. Local inhabitants believed Bianco could do miracles. Bianco was of the Orthodox tradition.
