= Regulus (1797 ship) =

History

Spain
- Captured: 1797

Great Britain
- Namesake: Regulus
- Acquired: 1797 by purchase of a prize
- Fate: Broken up 1806

General characteristics
- Tons burthen: 193, or 198, or 203, or 206 (bm)
- Complement: 1799:18; 1803:70
- Armament: 1799:8 × 12-pounder guns; 1803:16 × 12-pounder guns + 6 swivel guns; 1805:2 × 6-pounder guns + 8 × 12-pounder carronades

Regulus was built in Spain. The British captured her in 1797. She spent her career trading to the Cape of Good Hope (the Cape:CGH), and West Africa, but was not a slave ship. She was briefly a privateer. She was broken up in 1806.

== Career ==
Regulus entered Lloyd's Register (LR) in 1797 with D. West, master, R. Ross, owner, and trade London–CGH.

On 10 May 1799 Captain John Robinson acquired a letter of marque. However, not long after Captain J. Ranter replaced Robinson but apparently did not acquire his own letter. Her trade was still London–CGH. At some point her owner became Heathfield.

With the resumption of war with France in 1803, Regulus became a privateer. Captain George White acquired a letter of marque on 27 May 1803.

Lloyd's List (LL) reported on 5 July 1803 that the privateer Regulus, of London, had sent into Plymouth Deux Margarites, which had been sailing from San Domingo to Bordeaux.

On 29 July the privateers Regulus and Ajax captured Marie Bernard, Godfrey, master, on 6 July as she was sailing from Guadeloupe to Havre and sent her into Falmouth.

Regulus captured Ceres, from Cette and sent her into Plymouth on 1 August.

On 14 August Bon Accord, Passmore, master, arrived at Dover, as a prize to Regulus.

On 16 August LL reported that Regulus had captured Conception and Jean Baptiste as they were sailing from Havana to Malaga.

She continued to cruise until November, but then left privateering.

LR for 1804 showed her master as J.Ranter, changing to A. Macauley, her owner as Heathfield, and her trade as London–CGH, changing to London–Sierra Leone. Though she traded with West Africa, she was not a slaver; she does not appear in the most complete database of the Trans Atlantic Slave Trade.

== Fate ==
The Register of Shipping for 1806 showed her master as M'Cawley, Drinkall, owner, and her trade as London–Sierra Leone. She had undergone small repairs in 1800 and 1803. The listing bears the annotation "broke up". Lloyd's Register continued to carry her name through 1812.
