= Action of 16 April 1755 =

1755 naval battle near Benidorm

- Part of Spanish-Barbary Wars
Date	16 April 1755 (14 hours)
Location	Off Benidorm, Spain
Result	Spanish victory

Belligerents
Spain	Regency of Algiers

Commanders and leaders
José Flon y Sesma	Archimussa (POW)

Strength
5 xebecs	3 xebecs 60 cannons

Casualties and losses
5 killed 50 wounded	3 xebecs sunk All killed or captured
- 14 European slaves freed

The Action of 16 April 1755 was fought off Benidorm, between a Spanish fleet of 5 xebecs and an Algerian fleet of 3 xebecs. The Spaniards were victorious and captured the whole crew.

== Battle ==
The names of the five Spanish xebecs were Aventurero, Ibicenco, Catalán, Garzota and Gavilán and were led by the Spanish commander José Flon y Sesma while the 3 Algerian xebecs had 24, 22 and 14 cannons and were led by Archimussa, an Algerian corsair. The two fleets met off the coast of Benidorm and, after 14 hours of fighting, the Spanish emerged victorious, sinking the three Algerian xebecs.

== Aftermath ==
The Spanish disembarked them in the port of Cartagena, where their wounds were treated and would later be recognized. Among the crew were 321 Turks, 162 Moors and 9 privateers who had previously worked for Spain. Among the slaves were 1 Christian, 11 Dutch, 1 Piedmontese and 1 Roman which had recently been captured in a Dutch hulk and were on their way to Algiers. The slaves were freed but the Turks and Moors were enslaved.

== Bibliography ==
- de La Croix, Abbé Nicolle (1779). Geografia moderna (in Spanish). J. Ibarra.
- Arribas y Seria, Juan (1792). Enciclopedia Metódica, Geografía Moderna (in Spanish). imp. Sancha.
- Pío Aladrén, Pilar Sam; Moreno, Carmen Zamarrón (1979). Catálogo de la colección de documentos de Vargas Ponce que possee el Museo Naval: Serie primera, numeración romane (in Spanish). Editorial CSIC - CSIC Press. ISBN 978-84-500-3648-0.
- Martínez, Manuel Martínez (July 2013). Los forzados de marina en la España del siglo XVIII (1700-1775) (in Spanish). Universidad Almería. ISBN 978-84-15487-83-8.
- Gozalo, Maximiliano Barrio (2006). Esclavos y cautivos: Conflicto entre la cristiandad y el islam en el siglo XVIII (in Spanish). Junta de Castilla y León, Consejería de Cultura y Turismo. ISBN 978-84-9718-383-3.
- Martínez, Manuel Martínez (14 November 2007). Los forzados de Marina en el siglo XVIII. El caso de los gitanos (1700-1765). Universidad Almería. ISBN 978-84-8240-852-1.
- Macabich, Isidoro (1967). Historia de Ibiza. Editorial Daedalus.
