= Lo Hon-cho =

20th-century Chinese pirate

Lo Hon-cho or Lo Honcho was a 20th-century Chinese pirate. Lo was married to a powerful pirate leader and took command of his fleet after his death in 1921. Under her leadership, the fleet expanded to encompass 64 junks. Lo raided in southern China, in the vicinity of Beihai, and earnt a terrifying reputation on account of her ruthlessness. Her career came to a sudden end in October 1922 when she was captured by the Chinese military.

== Biography ==
Lo Hon-cho was married to a powerful pirate. After the death of her husband in 1921, she took command of his fleet, much in the same way as the previous Chinese woman pirate leader Zheng Yi Sao (1775–1844). She was probably at least in her mid-20s at the time. Lo eventually commanded 64 junks, a greater number of ships than her husband had led. She raided the countryside in southern China, most frequently operating in the vicinity of Beihai. Lo is described in surviving sources as being young, beautiful and ruthless. She earnt a terrifying reputation through her raids. A news report from 1922 describes her as "the most murderous and ruthless of all China's assortment of banditti". Lo raided and plundered villages, often carrying away captured groups of up to 50 or 60 girls to sell into sexual slavery.

She briefly fought alongside the Chinese military in the uprisings of the early 1920s, joining forces with the general Wong Min-Tong. Wong Min-Tong, also described in some sources as a woman, commanded 50 junks. Together, Lo and Wong collected a ransom from Beihai to prevent the city being looted. Lo received the rank of colonel, a relatively unique distinction for a pirate. Wong shortly thereafter travelled to Guangzhou, whereafter Lo returned to piracy.

Lo's career came to a sudden end in October 1922, having been a pirate leader for less than a year. Lo stopped by a coastal village and was surprised by a Chinese warship while feasting. She engaged the military vessel in battle but lost 40 of her junks and fled. After the military commander of the region including Beihai offered a promise of pardon for Lo's capture, one of her followers betrayed her, leading to her being apprehended. Lo's fate thereafter is not known from surviving sources; it is possible that she was simply killed. According to Richard Gordon McCloskey, who visited southern China in the 1930s and spoke to the locals, he was told that Lo Hon-cho was "killed on a piratical expedition".

== Legacy ==
Some modern authors speculate that another pirate woman, Lai Choi San (active in the later 1920s and 30s), rose to power through taking command of portions of Lo's former fleet after her capture.

Little is known in detail about Lo's life due to the very scant source material available outside of China. She became known internationally through the publication of an English-language report in Guangzhou at the time of her capture. No study on Lo Hon-cho has yet been made based on potential Chinese-language source material. Stories of Lo's brief pirate career were still being told and shared with outsiders in southern China in the 1930s.
