= Emilio Changco =

Filipino criminal

- Emilio Changco in 1992 at the New Bilibid Prison
- Died: 1992; New Bilibid Prison
- Criminal charges: Piracy

Emilio Changco (died 1992) was a pirate gang leader based out of Manila Bay in the Philippines. He specialized in "piracy-for-hire", where clients would hire the Changco Gang to seize the ship, remove the client's cargo, and then sell the ship. Changco was eventually captured and imprisoned by Philippine authorities. In 1992 he was killed by law enforcement agents under circumstances which have been characterised as suspicious. Philippine government officials claim he was shot while trying to escape from the New Bilibid Prison, although the fact that he was disabled and used a cane raised suspicions about the official claim.

== Changco Gang ==
In the 1980s and 1990s, operating out of Manila Bay, Changco and his followers used the area's thousands of islands and many small ports to their advantage. They specialized in targeted piracy, where a client would pay US$300,000 and then tell the gang which ship was to be targeted. The ship would be raided by the gang, its crew confined, and then sailed to an out-of-the-way port, all the while falsely transmitting to its owners that it had been stricken by mechanical difficulties and confined to port. In at least one instance, members of Changco's gang stowed away on the ship before it set sail and then assisted other pirates in boarding once the ship set sail. After the seizure, either in port or at sea, the cargo would be transferred to another ship and then the crew would be unloaded and told not to report the incident for a few days. This allowed the Changco gang to paint over the ship, disguising it as a completely different vessel, a "phantom-ship" that could be used for other tasks such as smuggling goods or human smuggling.

Changco was well-known throughout the region and companies would often hire him to steal back their cargoes. Companies would also hire him for insurance fraud. The insurance fraud occurred by means of a company overestimating the value of a ship near the end of its service life, then over-insuring the ship before hiring the Changco gang to seize the ship. The missing ship would be resold by the gang and the original owner would claim the insurance money for the ship.

== Arrest, imprisonment and death ==
By the early 1990s, Changco became so brazen that he stole a tanker owned by the Philippine government, M/T Tabangao. The embarrassment that this event caused the government motivated an increased effort to stop the gang's piracy. Changco was soon arrested and imprisoned in the New Bilibid Prison in Manila. In 1992, while a prisoner, Changco was shot and killed during what authorities stated was an attempt to escape from jail. The circumstances surrounding his death are suspicious, however, as at the time of his death he could barely walk and needed a cane. In his book The Brutal Seas: Organised Crime at Work, author Douglas Stewart discusses how Changco's death was more likely an effort to silence him than due to a legitimate escape attempt.
