= MV Pacific Opal =

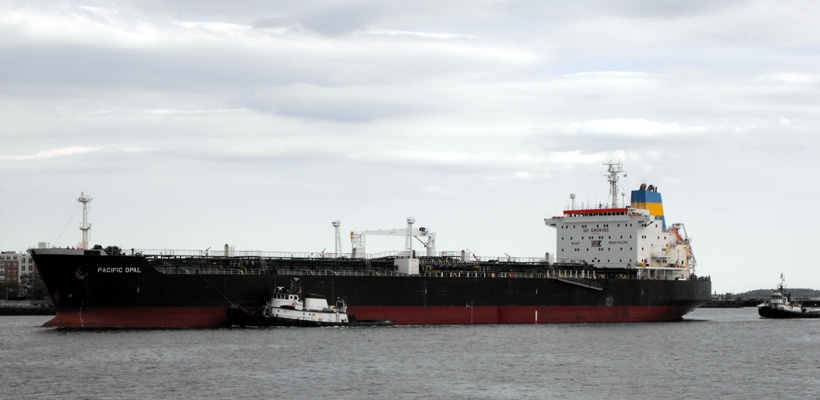

History
- Name: Hatasia (1993-2006); Pacific Opal (2006-)
- Owner: First International Capital Ltd Group, Monrovia (as completed); Tankers Pacific Management
- Port of registry: Liberia (as Hatasia)
- Builder: Halla Engineering & Heavy Industries, Inchon, Korea
- Yard number: S-197
- Launched: 23 October 1993
- Completed: December 1993
- Identification: IMO number: 9047386
- Status: Active

General characteristics
- Tonnage: 28,277 NT; 46,851 DWT
- Length: 601 ft 5.5 in (183.32 m)
- Beam: 105 ft 7.75 in (32.20 m)
- Draught: 40 ft 0.75 in (12.21 m)
- Speed: 15.5 knots (28.7 km/h; 17.8 mph)
- Capacity: 325,977 barrels of fluid

MT Pacific Opal (ex-Hatasia) is a chemical tanker built in 1993 and currently owned by Tankers Pacific Management Singapore.

== Event off Somalia ==
On 4 April 2009 three skiffs were spotted approaching the ship while sailing through the Arabian Sea. The Pacific Opal radioed for help from the nearby HMCS Winnipeg (FFH 338) which launched a Sea King helicopter to assist, following its arrival the pirates retreated from the ship. The ship was approached by two skiffs on 5 April 2011, while sailing off the coast of Somalia Heading for Mombasa from the Persian Gulf. The Skiffs with pirates, proceeded to then attack the Pacific Opal. The Pacific Opal sent a mayday, which was received by an EU NAFOR vessel that was patrolling in the Indian Ocean at the time.

The skiffs, one attacking the port side and the other the starboard side, retreated after the on-board security team had fired flares and warning shots. The vessel was fired upon by the skiffs before they retreated and headed off toward the mother ship which was 10 miles off in the distance.

The pirates, along with their mother ship and skiffs were then detained by the EU NAVFOR Finnish warship FNS POHJANMAA on 6 April. The Pirates were later released on 21 April because the Finish Navy were unable to prosecute them.
