= Antoine Bollo =

French privateer

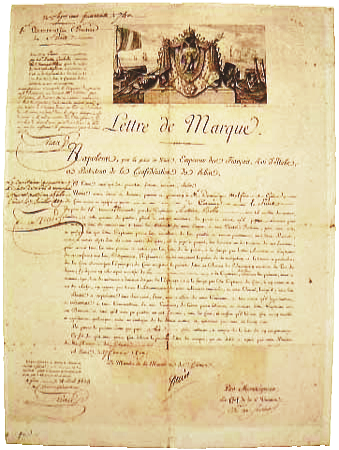
Letter of Marque given to Bollo by Malfino, on February 27, 1809

Captain Antoine Bollo was a French privateer in the time of the Napoleonic Wars.

In February 1809 he received command of the Furet, a 15 long tons (15 t) privateer owned by Dominique Malfino from Gênes.
