= Tuanku Abbas =

Malayan pirate

- Born: Aceh, Sultanate of Aceh
- Piratical career
- Type: Pirate
- Years active: 1840s
- Rank: Captain
- Base of operations: Indian Ocean

Tuanku Abbas was a Malayan pirate active in the 1840s and the brother of a rajah of Aceh. He was well known for sponsoring and leading pirate raids, the most notable of which occurred in 1843 when he captured an Indian Crew and plundered their ship. After the incident the crew escaped and appealed to the British authorities who, the following year, burned Abbas' village to the ground.
