= Yaron Gottlieb =

French-Israeli lawyer

Yaron Gottlieb (Hebrew: ירון גוטליב) is a French-Israeli lawyer who has expertise in maritime piracy, and has done extensive work for Interpol and the UN. He has been quoted in numerous law reviews, including Penn State and Harvard. He has also written for and been quoted in a number of other journals.

He has also taken an interest in the destruction of religious sites, the transition of these sites when regimes fall, and preventing the extradition of people wanted for political crimes.
