= Mansel Alcantra =

Spanish pirate

- Born: Spain
- Piratical career
- Years active: 1820s
- Rank: Captain
- Base of operations: South Atlantic Ocean
- Commands: Macrinarian

Mansel Alcantra or Alcantara (fl. 1829) was a Spanish pirate active in the South Atlantic during the early 19th century. As well as committing acts of piracy, he carried out several incidents of mass murder.

In 1829, his brig, the Macrinarian, captured the Liverpool packet ship Topaz near St. Helena while en route from Calcutta to Boston. After he and his men had finished looting the ship, Alcantara had the entire crew killed.

That same year, he seized and plundered a United States ship, the Candace from Marblehead. The ship's supercargo, allegedly an amateur actor, disguised himself as a Roman Catholic priest by dressing in a black gown and broad rimmed hat. He waited in his cabin pretending to "tell his beads" and, when the pirates finally entered his cabin, they respectfully crossed themselves and left the room. The young man was the only one of the crew and passengers not robbed by the pirates.
