= Montgomery (sloop) =

American privateer

The sloop Montgomery (1776) was an American privateer during the American Revolution. It was captained by William Rogers, who was succeeded by William Mercier. It sailed in tandem with Schuyler, both of whom shipped out of New York City harbor in 1776.

The Montgomery made several captures during the war, including the Charlotte in July 1776.
