= Mutiny on the Ethel =

Maritime crime in Western Australia in 1898

History

Western Australia
- Name: Ethel
- Owner: John Alfred Reddell
- Port of registry: Broome
- Laid down: 1870, Perth
- Fate: Scuttled, 1899

General characteristics
- Type: Brigantine
- Length: 13.4112 m (44.0 ft)
- Beam: 3.6576 m (12.0 ft)
- Draught: 1.7526 m (5.8 ft)
- Complement: 16 crew

Mutiny on the Ethel was a maritime mutiny that occurred in 1899. The crew of the brigantine Ethel mutinied, killing the captain and several crew members. The mutineers were caught and executed.

== Mutiny ==
The Ethel was used to resupply pearl luggers in Western Australia. The ship left Broome on 19 October 1899 under Captain John Redell. The crew mutinied, killing the captain and several other crew members, including the captain's son. The mutineers sailed the ship to the island of Selaru, where it was scuttled. The mutineers attempted to land on Selaru, but the locals were hostile, so they rowed in the whaleboards to the Adaoet, where there was a Dutch station.

They obtained transport to Macassar, but when they arrived they were arrested and sent to Perth. Six mutineers were tried in June 1900, and five of them were found guilty and sentenced to death. The sixth man was acquitted. Two death sentences were commuted to life imprisonment. The executions took place at Fremantle Prison.
