= Sinking of the Nossa Senhora da Conceição =

Portuguese naval engagement

- Part of Barbary–Portuguese conflicts
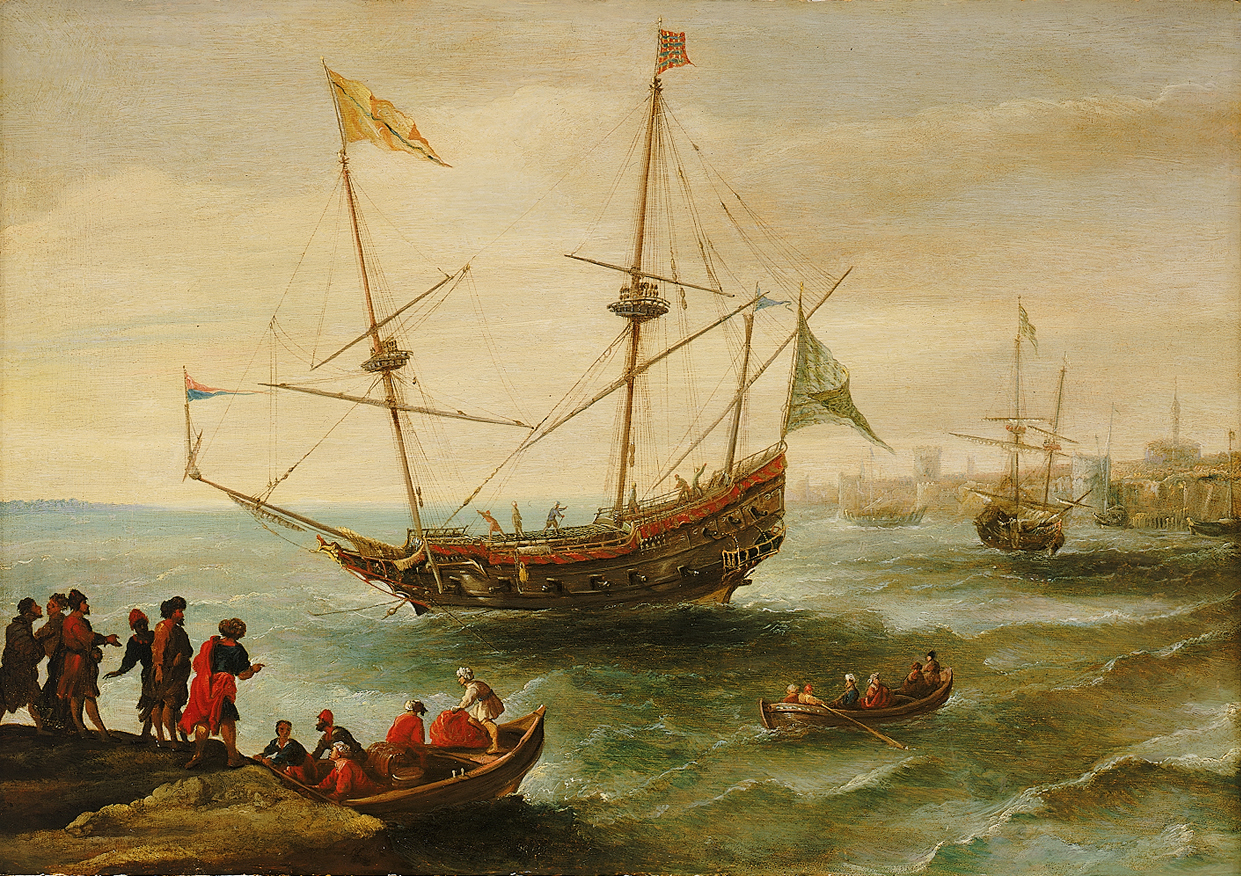
- Algerian patacho, inspired by Dutch lines
Date	8–11 October 1621
Location	Off Lisbon, Portugal
Result	First battle: Portuguese victory Second battle: Algerian victory

Belligerents
Kingdom of Portugal	Regency of Algiers

Commanders and leaders
(Portugal) Luís de Sousa (DOW)	Hassan Reis; Tabaco Reis

Units involved
(Portugal) Nossa Senhora da Conceição	Unknown

Strength
1 carrack 22 cannons 600–800 crew	17 ships; 30–40 cannons each; ~5,000 corsairs

Casualties and losses
Many killed and injured 1 carrack sunk	Most ships damaged

The sinking of the Nossa Senhora da Conceição was a naval engagement between the loaded Portuguese carrack, commanded by Luís de Sousa, and a fleet of Algerian corsairs in 1621. Severely outnumbered and heavily damaged after days of battle, the ship was engulfed in flames and sank with its rich cargo.

== Background ==
The Nossa Senhora da Conceição was a Portuguese carrack that departed from Goa, India, in March 1621, on a return voyage to Lisbon. The ship carried between 600 and 800 people and 22 cannons.

The voyage was difficult and lasted over seven months. After passing through the Azores, the Conceição's captain received reports that a Barbary corsair fleet was operating along the Portuguese coast. However, reassurances were given that a Portuguese fleet under Dom António de Ataíde would escort the carrack safely to Lisbon. As the Conceição approached Lisbon on October 8, 1621, it encountered a fleet of 17 Algerine ships but mistook them in the dark for friendly vessels.

== Battles ==
=== First battle, October 8, 1621 ===
At dawn, the crew of the Conceição realized they were surrounded by Barbary corsair ships, each armed with 30–40 cannons and manned by approximately 5,000 fighters. The Portuguese attempted to avoid confrontation by lowering their flag but quickly understood that the corsairs intended to attack. The crew prepared the ship for battle hurriedly.

The corsairs opened fire and attempted to board the ship; however, the Portuguese resisted those attempts. The ship's cannons damaged the corsair fleet, while hand-to-hand combat took place aboard the Conceição as the crew clashed with the defenders. By evening, after more than 11 hours, the Portuguese managed to drive the corsairs off their ship and held their position despite their losses.

After the battle, the crew of the Conceição worked through the night to repair the ship, restoring its sails, rigging, and other damaged components. The next morning, the corsairs saw the repaired state of the carrack and chose not to launch another attack. By October 10, navigating was now more safe and in better conditions.

=== Second battle, October 11, 1621 ===
On October 11, after trying to reach safety in Cascais, the Conceição was stranded near Ericeira due to weak winds, unable to move further. That morning, the Algerian fleet returned, reorganized and ready to continue the fight.

The Algerians stayed just out of range of the ship's cannons and then launched quick, repeated attacks. Many of the experienced Portuguese gunners had been killed or injured in the earlier battle, and they were replaced by less skilled crew members. Even so, the Conceição managed to hit the corsair flagship, which caused the enemy fleet to lose its formation briefly.

The Algerians then began firing incendiary weapons, setting parts of the ship on fire. One of their ships got tangled in the rigging of the Conceição, allowing the corsairs to board the vessel again. With the ship burning and no way to continue fighting, the Portuguese crew surrendered. The Nossa Senhora da Conceição eventually sank with all its rich cargo.

== Aftermath ==
The surviving crew and passengers were captured and distributed among the Algerian ships, to be taken as prisoners (slaves) to Algiers. Most were never ransomed and thereby remained in slavery in Algeria. Luís de Sousa, the captain, died of injuries three days later.

== Bibliography ==
- Nichols, Adam (November 30, 2024). Corsairs and Captives: Narratives from the Age of the Barbary Pirates. Pen and Sword History. pp. 102–108. ISBN 9781036106119.
- Ventura, Margarida Garcez; Varandas, José (June 2013). "Relato de João Carvalho Mascarenhas, um soldado português deslocado pelo mundo" [Report of João Carvalho Mascarenhas, a portuguese soldier displaced through the world]. História (São Paulo). 32 (1): 8–30. doi:10.1590/S0101-90742013000100003.
- Domingues, Francisco (2012). "O regimento dos capitães da armada de D. António de Ataíde".
