= Queen Charlotte (1781 ship) =

History

Great Britain
- Name: Queen Charlotte
- Acquired: 1781 by purchase of a prize
- Fate: Last listed in 1783

General characteristics
- Tons burthen: 400 (bm)
- Armament: 22 × 9-pounder guns + 6 × 6-pounder guns

Queen Charlotte was built in France and taken in prize c.1781, probably on the Jamaica Station. She first appeared in British on-line records first as a privateer and then a transport. She was last listed in 1783.

Queen Charlotte first appeared in Lloyd's Register (LR) in 1781.

Year	Master	Owner	Trade	Source & notes
1781	Henrick	Fraser & Co.	Jamaica–London	LR
1782	J.Henrick; R.Salmon	J.Fraser & Co.	London privateer London transport	LR
1783	R.Salmon	J.Fraser & Co.	London transport	LR
