= Wyszak =

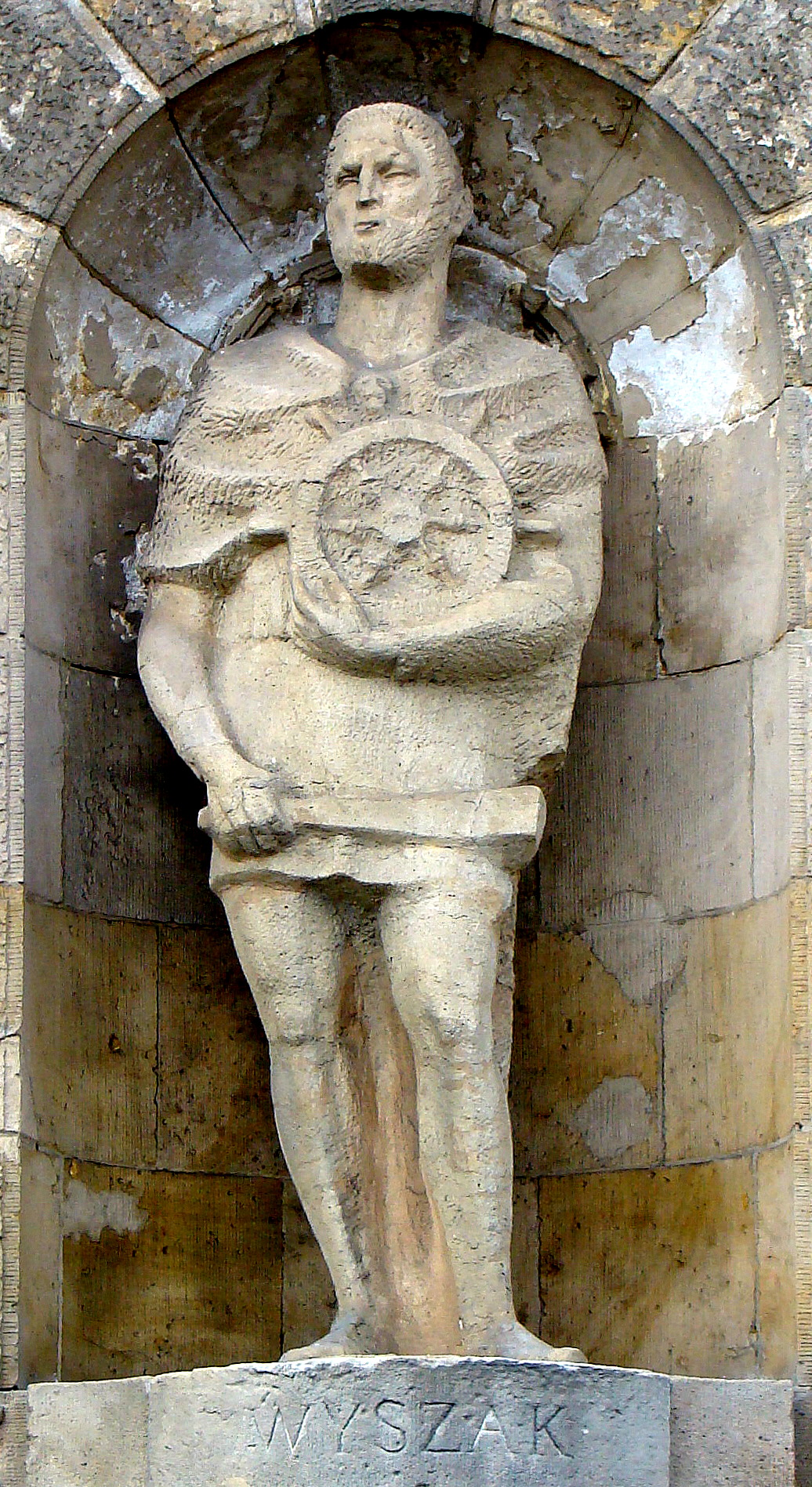
The statue of Wyszak by Stanisław Lewiński in Szczecin, Poland.

Wyszak (Polish: [ˈvɘ̟.ʂak]; Latin: Wirtschachus; Witscacus) was a 12th-century merchant, privateer, and a councilor in Szczecin, Poland.

== Biography ==
Wyszak was mentioned by Catholic monk Ebo of Michelsberg, in his writings about the life of missionary Otto of Bamberg. According to him, he was born at the beginning of the 12th century, and was an influential member of the city council of Szczecin (now in Poland). He came to his wealth by being a sea merchant and privateer, mainly active on the Danish coast.

In 1126, he led a plundering raid with six boats into Denmark. They were repealed, and Wyszak was captured. He remained as a prisoner for next two years, when he managed to escape and return to Szczecin on a small boat. He credited his survival to intercession from Otto of Bamberg. During his second missionary expedition to Pomerania, Wyszak had publicly supported Christianisation of the region, and helped Otto in his mission.

== Legacy ==
In 1970, next to the fountain at the Bolesław I the Brave Embankment in Szczecin, was unveiled a statue of Wyszak, holding a ship's wheel, by Stanisław Lewiński. It was made from artificial stone.
