= Capture of the brig Brillante =

19th century naval operation

- Part of the Suppression of the Slave Trade
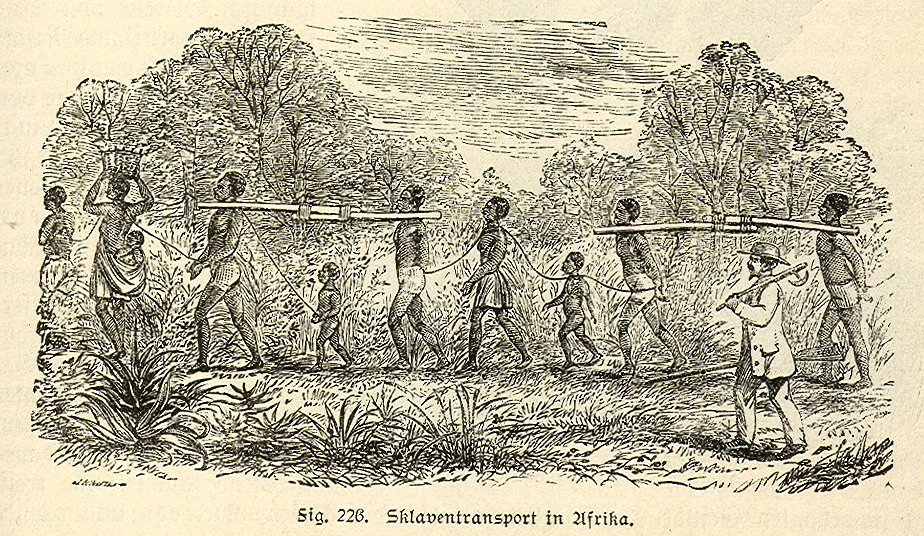
- "Slave Trade in Africa"
Date	1832
Location	off West Africa, Atlantic Ocean
Result	British victory, Brillante captured.

Belligerents
United Kingdom	African Slave Traders

The Capture of the brig Brillante occurred around 1832 and was considered a significant feat in the Blockade of Africa. Brillante was a slave ship that the Royal Navy succeeded in capturing after two failed attempts. The brig had a crew of sixty men and was armed with ten guns. Brillante was under the command of an English-born captain named Homans when she was seized. Homans was an experienced slaver who in ten cruises had landed 5,000 slaves on the coasts of Brazil and Cuba. Brillante reportedly fought at least two battles against the British anti-slavery patrols. She allegedly forced the crew of one British cruiser to abandon ship after a bloody action and on a different occasion, she repulsed boats from a Royal Navy sloop-of-war.

Finally, four navy vessels trapped Brillante by surrounding her. Just before his capture, Captain Homans murdered around 600 slaves by ordering that their hands be tied to the ship's anchor and that they be thrown over the side. The Britons who captured the ship arrived just after the incident and took control without resistance.

== See also ==
- USS Nightingale (1851)
- Lady Washington
