= MV Feisty Gas =

LPG carrier

MV Feisty Gas was a Hong Kong liquefied petroleum gas tanker that was seized by Somalian pirates in April 2005. The Hong Kong–based company that owned the vessel paid $315,000 to a representative of the Somali pirates in Mombasa, Kenya.
