= Aggie (1777 ship) =

History

Great Britain
- Name: Aggie, or Agie
- Builder: Liverpool
- Launched: 1777
- Renamed: Spy (1781)
- Captured: 4 June 1782

General characteristics
- Tons burthen: 80, or 110 ( (bm)
- Armament: 14 × 4-pounder guns

Aggie (or Agie), was launched in Liverpool in 1777. She traded locally until 1781 when her owners renamed her Spy. She briefly became a privateer, and then a slave ship, engaged in the triangular trade in enslaved people. The French Navy captured her in 1782 in the West Indies as she was arriving to deliver her cargo of slaves on her first slave-trading voyage.

== Career ==
Agie first appeared in Lloyd's Register (LR) in 1778.

Year	Master	Owner	Trade	Source
1778	R.Downes	R.Wicksted	Liverpool–Limerick	LR
1779	R.Downes	R.Wicksted	Liverpool–Elsinor	LR
1780	R.Downes	R.Wicksted	Galway Bay	LR
1781	R.Downes; Burrows	Wickstead	Liverpool–Limerick	LR; "now the Spy"
1781	J.Burrows	R.Wichfield	Liverpool privateer Liverpool–Africa	LR; raised 1780
1782	J.Burrows	Wickstead	Liverpool–Africa	LR; ex-Aggie

Slave trading voyage: Captain John Burrows sailed Spy from Liverpool in July 1781, bound for West Africa.

== Fate ==
On 4 June 1782 two French frigates captured Spy, Burrows, master, and took her into Dominica. She was carrying 250 captives and six tons of ivory.
