= John Rawleigh Jackson =

Jamaican planter and politician

John Rawleigh Jackson (1780 - after 1831) was a planter and slave-owner in Jamaica. He was elected to the House of Assembly of Jamaica in 1820 representing Port Royal where he was also the chief magistrate in 1831.
