= Glaucetas =

Glaucetas (Greek: Γλαυκέτας), sometimes transliterated Glauketas (fl. 315 – 300 BC), was a Greek privateer chiefly active in the Aegean Sea during the 4th century BC. Although little is known about his life, he is recorded in ancient Greek inscriptions describing how the Athenian navy under Thymochares of Sphettos raided his base on Kythnos and captured him and his men, thus "making the sea safe for those that sailed thereon." (I.G., II, 331.)
