= MV Ping Shin 101 killings =

2012 killings by a Taiwanese fishing boat

- Location: Indian Ocean
- Date: c. August 2012
- Target: Numerous other ship crews
- Attack type: Mass murder
- Weapon: Firearms
- Deaths: Around 35
- Perpetrators: Crews of the MV Ping Shin 101, Chun I 217, and related ships; Wang Fengyu; Unidentified bodyguards
- Motive: Unknown, anti-piracy (according to Wang)
- Convicted: Wang Fengyu

MV Ping Shin 1012 was a Taiwanese fishing boat known for multiple incidents in 2012 when its captain ordered the killing of four supposed pirates at sea as well as several other alleged killings.

== History ==
In 2014, a 10-minute video was uploaded to YouTube by an unknown source showing men clinging to the remains of an upturned boat as shots are fired at them from what appeared to be a fishing vessel, with men onboard laughing and posing for photographs after the killings.

Authorities learned of the killings only when the video turned up on a cellphone left in a taxi in Fiji in 2014. Then, Trygg Mat Tracking, a Norwegian research firm that focuses on maritime crime, determined that the ship was the Taiwanese-flagged Ping Shin 101 by comparing video footage with images in a maritime database. Former crew members of the Ping Shin 101 were found through Facebook postings and on other social media platforms. Interviews with them revealed the name of the captain and details of the killings.

After several years of public and journalistic pressure, the Taiwanese government issued a warrant for the arrest of mainland Chinese-born Wang Fengyu, captain of the Ping Shin 101, who ordered the killings.

Witnesses said that the Ping Shin 101 was fishing in the Indian Ocean somewhere between Somalia and the Seychelles in August 2012 when it received a radio alert that a nearby ship had come under attack by pirates. The supposed pirates, in a smaller boat, seemed to be unarmed, and probably were not pirates in the first place because they did not have weapons, only fishing equipment on their boat, as witnesses said.

The Taiwanese established that the Ping Shin 101 was, along with the Chun I 217 and two other unidentified fishing boats, fired on by a vessel manned by four pirates. After the ships were fired on, one of them decided to ram the pirate vessel, which then capsized, depositing the pirates overboard. Then, Wang Fengyu allegedly instructed the two Pakistani guards he hired aboard his ship to shoot the four men in the water. In January 2021, Wang was found guilty and sentenced to 26 years imprisonment. Then, in 2022, the Taiwan High Court ruled that the evidence only showed Wang had ordered the killing of one pirate, not four, and reduced the sentence to 13 years. Later, in 2024, the Taiwan High Court overturned the ruling, stating that Wang could have prevented the other three murders, and increased his sentence back to 26 years.

The Ping Shin 101 eventually sank on July 7, 2014 after Wang, still the captain, broadcast a distress signal citing a mechanical failure. "Something exploded," one crew member said on camera.
