= 2007 in piracy =

== Events ==
- June 3 - Danica White owned by H. Folmer & Co. is hijacked 240 nautical miles (440 km) off the Horn of Africa.
