= Contraband Days =

Annual festival in lake Charles, Louisiana

Louisiana Pirate Festival
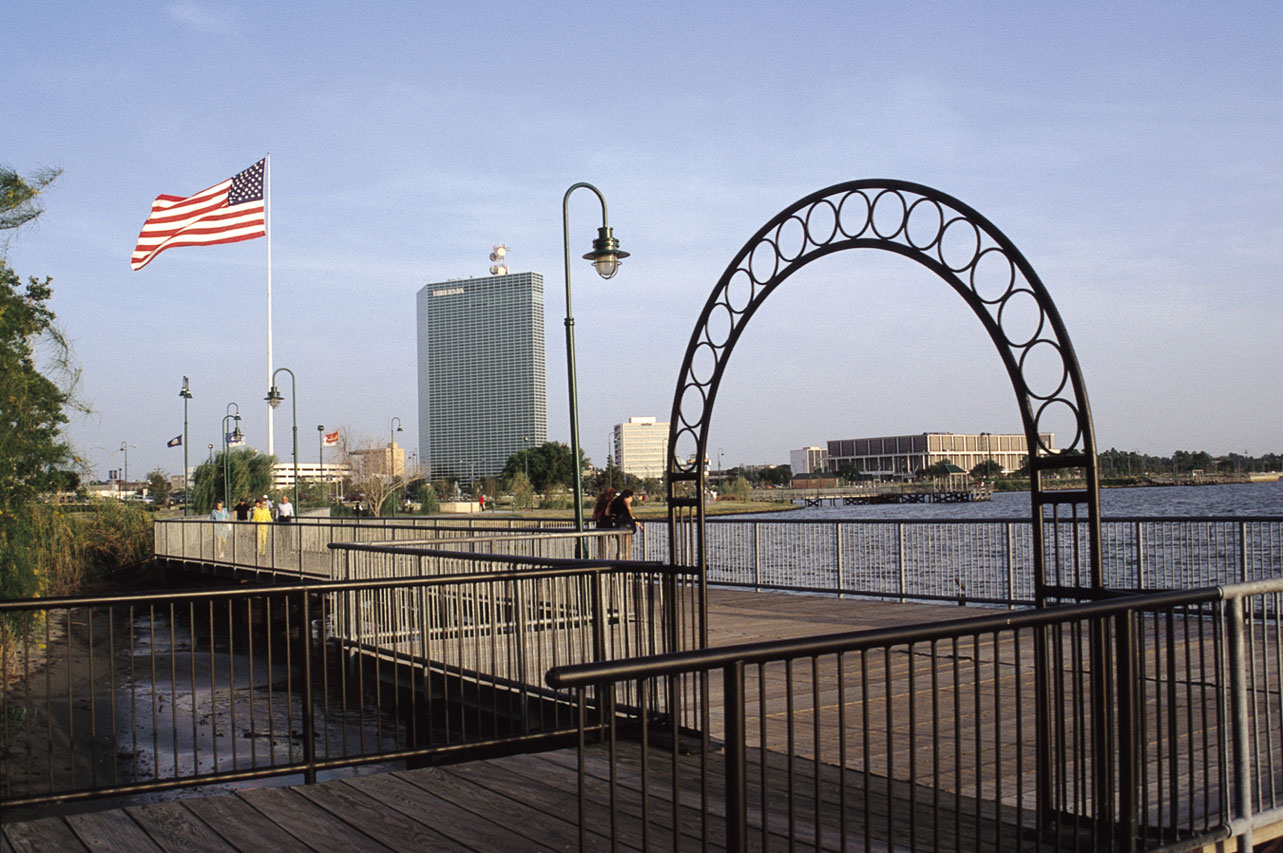
- The boardwalk on Lake Charles
- Type: Local, cultural
- Significance: cultural
- Celebrations: Parties, bands, entertainment
- Duration: 12 days
- Frequency: annual
- Related to: Mardi Gras

The Louisiana Pirate Festival (Contraband Days) is an annual festival in Lake Charles. It is among the larger celebrations in Louisiana, with an attendance of over 200,000. The Festival was first held in 1957.

Held during the first two weeks of May, Contraband Days is the city's official celebration of the legend of the pirate Jean Lafitte, who is associated with the area's waterways.
