= Tom Souville =

The flag of Calais, sported on the ship of Tom Souville, privateer of the city.

Tom Souville (24 February 1777, Calais – 31 December 1839, Calais), was a privateer and "rescue of Calais", causing the first "rescue boat" from Calais, lateen-rigged in 1819 with the support of society to Agriculture Calais. He was Freemason..

== Letter of Marque ==
Tom Souville is one of the most illustrious of the race system, the financial stakes for the time. Between 1811 and 1815, it reported more than 5 million francs to city of Calais, and from 1793, active from the ports of the Channel and North Sea. Tom Souville as a privateer in the city of Calais, sported on his ship, "the flag of Calais". Indeed, Calais was one of five cities in France to be allowed to have its own flag, by "Royal Order", with Dunkirk, Boulogne-sur-Mer, Le Havre and St Malo. Calais is the flag which floated so «Le Vieux Beffroi», at the head of town bands and of course, the mast of the privateers of the city.

== See also ==
- Letter of marque
- Privateer

== Bibliography ==
- Henri Chevalier, Vie et Aventures du Capitaine de Corsaire Tom Souville : ses combats, ses évasions, 1777-1839, Paris, Éditions Plon, Nourrit et Cie, 1895
- Henri Lemoine, Les Corsaires Calaisiens, Mémoires de la Société Historique du Calaisis
