= Lewis Ferdinando =

- Other name: Lodowick
- Occupation: Pirate
- Years active: 1699–1700
- Era: Golden Age of Piracy
- Piratical career
- Base of operations: Bermuda
- Commands: Samuel's Adventure

Lewis Ferdinando (first name also Lodowick, fl. 1699–1700) was a pirate active near Bermuda during the Golden Age of Piracy.

== History ==
Ferdinando in his ship Samuel's Adventure was prolific enough to inspire Bermudan merchant Samuel Saltus to grant power of attorney to a friend in Charles Towne, South Carolina, allowing him to sue for possession of Saltus’ stolen ship on the off chance that it turned up there. Saltus’ sloop had been taken by Ferdinando in 1699; Matthew Tryer (or Tyrer) was tried for piracy for the capture but was acquitted. Carolina Governor Joseph Blake ordered that Tryer not be tried again for any of Ferdinando's piracies. Ferdinando had taken nine ships in 1700 alone, making him a particular target for privateers commissioned by Bermuda's governor Benjamin Bennett. At least one of the ships he took belonged to John Trimingham, among Bermuda's wealthiest citizens.

In April 1700 Ferdinando had the captains of two captured ships aboard his own. While there he had them witness a letter he wrote absolving of piracy a sailor named Briggs whom he'd forced into serving the pirates. He released the sailor with other prisoners; arrested for piracy some years later, Briggs produced the letter, and Governor Bennett had him formally acquitted.

== See also ==
- Admiralty court - the venue in which Tyrer was tried and acquitted.
