= Vincenzo Alessandri =

Vincenzo Alessandri (died 1657) was an Italian Knight of Malta who became a buccaneer.

Originally a Knight of Malta, Alessandri became a notorious buccaneer. He was captured and pressed into forced labour and died in 1657.

There are several references to a Vincenzo Alessandri who was Venetian ambassador to Persia during the 16th century but given the provided date of death, it is unlikely the two are the same person.
