= 1711 in piracy =

This article covers 1711 in piracy.

== Events ==
=== Americas ===
- 21 September – Battle of Rio de Janeiro: French Privateer René Duguay-Trouin captures Rio de Janeiro, and takes the Portuguese governor for ransom.

=== Europe ===
- October 14 - Woodes Rogers returns to England after a successful round-the-world privateering cruise against Spain, carrying loot worth £150,000. Broils with the Admiralty courts delay distribution of the treasure.
