= MV Yasin C =

History
- Name: Yasin C
- Operator: Bergen Shipping
- Port of registry: Turkey
- Identification: IMO number: 8208191

General characteristics
- Tonnage: 22,353
- Length: 178 meter
- Beam: 28 meters
- Crew: 25

Yasin C is a Turkish bulk carrier, captured by Somali pirates on 7 April 2010 while on its way to Mombasa. The crew locked themselves in the engine room, and the ship was released without ransom on 10 April 2010.
