= Gabriel Da Parma =

14th c. pirate captain in the Adriatic sea

Gabriel Da Parma or Gabriele di Parma (fl. 1370s) was a pirate captain of Bari who became known for raiding ships on the Adriatic coast. He was from the Carrarese family. In 1391, Da Parma wanted revenge against the Ragusans for stopping his raids in the Adriatic sea. The conflicts continued until 1425.
