= Savina Caylyn =

History
- Owner: Fratelli D'Amato
- Launched: 2 April 2008
- Identification: IMO number: 9489285

General characteristics
- Type: Oil Tanker
- Tonnage: 58,418 GT
- Length: 266 m (873 ft)
- Beam: 46 m (151 ft)

Savina Caylyn is an oil tanker of the Italian shipping line Fratelli D'Amato. On 8 February 2011, she was hijacked by Somali pirates some 500 miles (800 km) off the Indian Coast and some 880 miles (1,420 km) off the Somali Coast. The 17 Indian and 5 Italian crew members of the Italy-registered vessel were reported to be unharmed, but taken hostage.

The 266-metre-long (873 ft) Savina Caylyn was on the way to Malaysia from Sudan, and had evaded capture by pirates several times before. It was reported that the inability of the vessel to keep up higher speeds had eventually allowed the heavily armed pirates to overtake her. Small arms and at least 4 rocket propelled grenades were reportedly fired during the attack.

As of 16 February 2011, a news embargo has apparently been placed over potential military operations that might recover the tanker, and which are reported to involve the frigate Zeffiro and the patrol vessel Fulgosi of the European Union task force in the area, led to Savina Caylyn by satellite observations.

On 21 December 2011, the ship was released after long negotiations and the 17 Indian and 5 Italian crew members returned to their home countries. It has been reported that a ransom was paid for the release of the ship and crew members.
