= Lizard (1814 ship) =

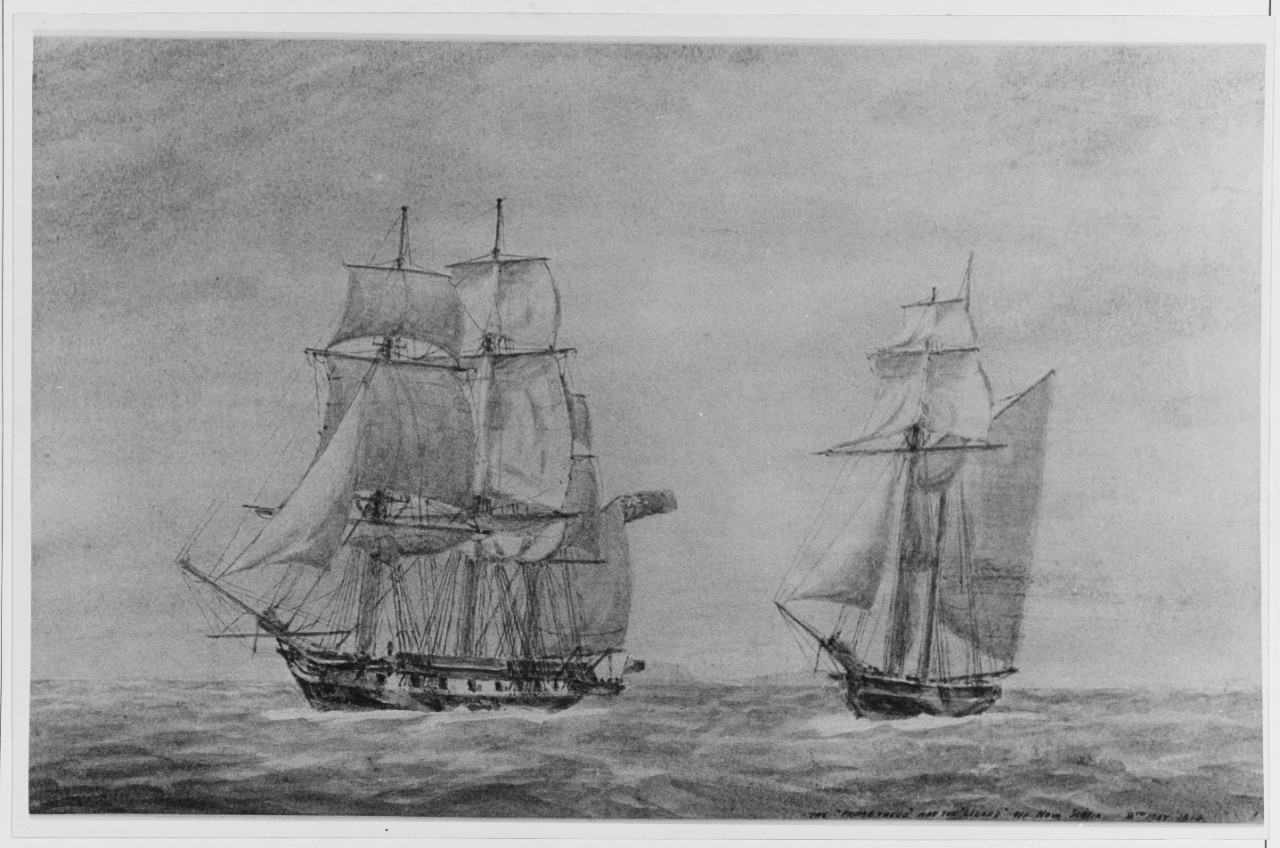
- HMS Prometheus captures US privateer Lizard, March 1814

History

United States
- Name: Lizard
- Owner: Stephen White Jr., Stephen White, Thomas M.Woodbridge, Samuel Kennedy
- Commissioned: 19 February 1814, Salem
- Renamed: 5 March 1814

General characteristics
- Tons burthen: 56, or 60 (bm)
- Sail plan: Schooner
- Complement: 32, or 35
- Armament: 2 guns

Lizard was a United States privateer schooner commissioned at Salem on 19 February 1814. HMS Prometheus captured Lizard on 5 March. Lizard had been out 12 days and had made no captures. Prometheus sent Lizard into Halifax, Nova Scotia, where the Vice admiralty court condemned her.

American sources gave the name of Lizard's master as Samuel Loring. The Vice admiralty records show the master as B.Cook.
