= Jan Jacobsen (English service) =

Dutch corsair and privateer

- Born: fl. 1665; Flanders
- Died: 1667
- Piratical career
- Type: Privateer
- Allegiance: England
- Years active: 1660s
- Rank: Captain
- Base of operations: Dunkirk
- Battles: Second Anglo-Dutch War

Jan Jacobsen (fl. 1665–1667) was a mid-17th-century Flemish-born Dutch corsair and privateer. Operating out of France with other Dunkirkers such as Karel Verburg and Jan Jansen Gouverneur, he acted on behalf of England during the Second Anglo-Dutch War in the mid-1660s.
