= Rover (1781 ship) =

History

Great Britain
- Name: Judith
- Launched: 1775, New York
- Renamed: Rover (circa 1781)
- Captured: 28 March 1783

General characteristics
- Tons burthen: 72, or 100 (bm)
- Complement: 1780: 50; 1782: 20
- Armament: 1780: 14 × 4-pounder guns + 6 swivel guns; 1782: 12 × 9-pounder carronades

Rover had been launched in New York, possibly as Judith, or an earlier name. Rover appeared in British records in 1781. She became a privateer and survived a severe engagement in 1781. Circa 1782 ownership of Rover transferred to Liverpool from Bristol, and she became a slave ship in the triangular trade in enslaved people. An American privateer captured Rover in March 1783 as she was transiting the Middle Passage, sailing from Africa to the West Indies.

== Career ==
Circa 1781 her owners renamed Judith as Rover and she became a Bristol-based privateer. Rover first appeared in Lloyd's Register in 1781.

Year	Master	Owner	Trade	Source
1781	Hunter	J.Powell	Bristol privateer	LR
1782	R.Latham	Staniforth	Bristol privateer Liverpool–Africa	LR

On 16 April 1781 the privateer Rover, Hunter, master, returned to Bristol from a cruise. On 19 February she had encountered four French letters of marque near Cape St Vincent. In the ensuing engagement she had her surgeon, lieutenant and two seamen killed, and four men wounded.

Next, Rover became a Liverpool-based slave ship. Captain Roger Leathom sailed from Liverpool on 22 June 1782, bound for West Africa.

== Loss ==
On 28 March 1783 an American privateer captured Rover, Latham, master, as she was sailing from Africa to the West Indies. Rover was carrying 209 captives. The Americans took Rover and her captives into Martinique. Rover had left Liverpool with a crew of 27 men, three of whom died on the voyage.
