= Johan Arnold Smellekamp =

Landdrost of Bloemfontein (Orange Free State)
- In office 1 October 1854 – 31 May 1856

Member of the Volksraad of the Orange Free State
- In office 1863–1866
- Constituency: Smithfield

Personal details
- Born: 16 January 1812 Amsterdam, Netherlands
- Died: 25 May 1866 (aged 54) Bloemfontein, Orange Free State
- Spouse(s): Maria Catharina Görlach; Hillegonda Sara Wilvinger
- Occupation: supercargo, politician, civil servant, law agent

Johan Arnold Smellekamp (16 January 1812 in Amsterdam, Netherlands – 25 May 1866 in Bloemfontein, Orange Free State) was a Dutchman who pioneered trade with the Boer Voortrekker states in South Africa and later became a civil servant, politician, and law agent in the Orange Free State.

== Biography ==
=== Family ===
Smellekamp was the son of Jan Hendrik Smellekamp and Johanna Maria Coeré.

Smellekamp married Maria Catharina Görlach, who subsequently died. He then remarried Hillegonda Sara Wilvinger, the twenty-eight-year-old daughter of Johannes Wilvinger and Hendrika Wassenaar, in Zaandam on 8 December 1852. Smellekamp had three daughters and a son.

=== Trading with South Africa ===
Smellekamp worked as a supercargo for the Amsterdam trading company of J.A. Klijn & Co., under the direction of G.G. Ohrig. In 1841, he made his first voyage to Port Natal with the objective of establishing trading contracts with the Voortrekkers who had established the Natalia Republic only two years prior. At the time of Smellekamp's arrival, the British under Captain Thomas Charlton Smith were several days' march away from Port Natal, preparing to occupy the town.

Together with Ohrig, Smellekamp visited Pietermaritzburg to meet with the Volksraad of Natalia. They were received with great enthusiasm by the population, with streets decorated with flags and other cloths. The people of Natalia were – mistakenly – under the impression that Smellekamp's arrival heralded a full-scale intervention by the Netherlands. Smellekamp enjoyed his sudden importance and did nothing to correct this impression. The Volksraad made promises about future trade and requested immigrants to strengthen the Boer state.

The deteriorating political situation led the Volksraad to offer Natal as a colonial possession to King William II (resolution 25 April 1842) in case Britain annexed the Voortrekker territory. Smellekamp traveled back to the Netherlands via Cape Town. On the way, he was arrested at Swellendam because he did not have the proper travel documents. Meanwhile, the British government started official correspondence with the Dutch government about Smellekamp's activities in Natal, convinced that he was an agitator. King William II rejected the proposed connection between the Netherlands and the Voortrekkers of Natal, and before the year was out, he apologized to White Hall for the affray caused by Smellekamp and his activities.

In 1843, Smellekamp returned to Natal but was refused entry into Port Natal by the British and was obliged to go to Delagoa Bay instead. In the winter of 1844, Hendrik Potgieter, the leader of the Potchefstroom-Winburg Republic, which had declared independence on 9 April 1844, visited Delagoa Bay looking for a free passage to the sea. He negotiated with Smellekamp, who advised him to move his people north of the 26th degree of latitude, outside of the British sphere of influence, and where they would have the opportunity to trade freely with Dutch traders. The discussions resulted in Potgieter and a group of Voortrekkers from the former Natalia Republic moving to the North-East Transvaal, where they established Andries-Ohrigstad.

Smellekamp remained in Southern and East Africa for almost two years before returning to the Netherlands in 1846. There, he quarreled with his boss about the best way to bring trade to South Africa, with Smellekamp advocating for an open market. However, from the trading company's point of view, director Ohrig did not favor this idea. Smellekamp made three more trips to South Africa, twice at a loss. With the final voyage in 1853, he migrated to South Africa and established himself in Lydenburg in the Transvaal in February 1854. Soon after his arrival in Lydenburg, Smellekamp fell out with the Dutch reformed minister Rev. Dirk van der Hoff of Potchefstroom, also a Dutchman, at the general synod of the Dutch Reformed church in Rustenburg. Smellekamp lost and was first censured by the church, then fined by the Volksraad and finally banished. He moved to Cape Town, where he published a rebuttal to the accusations made against him.

=== Civil servant and law practice ===
Despite his banishment, Smellekamp remained active and engaged with the Boer republics. He moved to the Orange Free State, where he was quickly appointed Landdrost of Bloemfontein on 1 October 1854. However, Smellekamp's volatile character soon triggered a conflict with State President Boshoff, resulting in a short but bitter correspondence between the two men. Consequently, Smellekamp was dismissed as Landdrost on 31 May 1856. At the base of the conflict was a real political controversy about the international position of the state, in which Smellekamp was not alone. Groenendaal stood by his side, against Boshoff. The controversy concerned the mission of the Dutchman Hiddingh, who came to Bloemfontein in January 1856 as an official Dutch envoy to present a flag and coat of arms of the Orange Free State to the government as a gift from King William III of the Netherlands. Boshoff, unaware that the paraphernalia had been ordered by his predecessor and cautious not to offend the British government, hesitated to receive Hiddingh in an official capacity. In turn, Groenendaal and Smellekamp started a press offensive against Boshoff in newspapers in both Bloemfontein and Cape Town, strongly condemning Boshoff for his actions to such an extent that the latter had no choice but to dismiss both.

After his dismissal, Smellekamp remained in Bloemfontein, where he settled as a licensed law agent. The relationship with President Boshoff did not improve, and Smellekamp agitated against him until he retired from office in 1859.

Smellekamp was not unpopular with everyone in the Orange Free State. In 1863, he stood for election to the Volksraad for the constituency of Ladysmith and won the seat. He remained a member of the Volksraad until his death three years later. An active freemason, Smellekamp was also Governing Master of the Union Lodge (Loge Unie) at Bloemfontein.

=== Personality and influence ===
Smellekamp had a restless and irascible personality, which made him many enemies and hampered his progress in life. Nevertheless, his influence on the early formation of the Boer republics in the hinterland of the Cape Colony was considerable. Without him, the Dutch interest in the Voortrekker movement and the fate of the 'Boer kinsmen', which resulted in a migration drive and long-standing cultural connections, would most likely not have emerged in the way it did.

Despite his volatile character, Smellekamp understood the necessity to build a national consciousness in the new republics for their survival in the face of many internal and external challenges. While he was seen as propagating the interests of the 'Dutch faction' in the Orange Free State, this criticism is only valid to a point. In Smellekamp's view, building a new identity meant building a joint identity, and a strong alliance with the Netherlands – against continued British imperial ambitions – was a helpful instrument in this project. This view aligns with his enthusiasm for the national anthem, written by H.A.L. Hamelberg and accepted as such by the Volksraad on 24 February 1866. In his capacity as Governing Master of the Union Lodge, Smellekamp facilitated the widespread and free distribution of the anthem among the burghers of the Orange Free State.

== See also ==
- Jan Willem Spruyt

== Bibliography ==
- Smellekamp, J.A. (1854). Mijn wedervaren in de Zuid-Afrikaansche Republiek, vooral in betrekking met den predikant D. Van der Hoff; bevattende de aanleidende omstandigheden tot de drie over mij in gezegde republiek gevelde vonnissen van sensuur, boete en bannissement. Kroonstad.
