= Cornelis Hiddingh =

South African-born Dutch barrister and civil servant (1809-1871)

Special envoy of the King of the Netherlands to South Africa
- In office November 1855 – 1856

Consul general of the Orange Free State in the Netherlands
- In office 10 September 1861 – 4 September 1871

Personal details
- Born: 10 June 1809 Cape Town, Cape Colony
- Died: 4 September 1871 (aged 62) Arnhem, Netherlands
- Spouse: Georgina Aleijda Oosting
- Education: University of Groningen
- Profession: Lawyer

Cornelis Hiddingh, RNL (10 June 1809 – 4 September 1871) was a Dutch Cape Colony born lawyer and civil servant. He acted as special envoy to the Orange Free State and South African Republic from 1855–1856. He was consul general of the Orange Free State in the Netherlands between 1861 and 1871.

== Family ==
Cornelis Hiddingh was born in Cape Town on 10 June 1809. He was the second son of Willem Hiddingh (1773–1839) and Anna Margaretha van der Poel (1780–1854).

His father was a member of a prominent old Dutch family from the province of Drenthe, where he practised as a lawyer. As a supporter of the Orange political faction in the Netherlands, Willem Hiddingh found himself out of place under the revolutionary Batavian government, and requested an appointment at the Cape of Good Hope. In 1802, he was appointed member of the Raad van Justitie (Council of Justice) in Cape Town and moved to the Dutch Cape Colony. He kept this position for twenty-five years under both Dutch and British rule, until his retirement in 1827.

Cornelis Hiddingh married Georgina Aleijda Oosting (1822–1898) in Assen, in the Netherlands, on 11 May 1852. His wife was a daughter of Hendrik Jan Oosting, mayor of Assen, and Mana Hofstede. The couple had twelve children, seven sons and five daughters.

== Early life ==
Cornelis Hiddingh came to the Netherlands in 1820, together with his older brother Willem (1808–1899), to attend school. The brothers were first taken in by Petrus Hofstede, a family member, and governor of the province of Drenthe. He lodged them for several months at his country estate, and also acted as their guardian. Later, the brothers were sent to a private boarding school in Groningen to complete their school education. In 1824, both brothers enrolled in the University of Groningen to study law, and both graduated as doctor of law in 1830. Willem then returned to South Africa, while Cornelis remained in the Netherlands. After concluding his studies, Cornelis Hiddingh established himself in the provincial town of Assen, where he became a tax collector and alderman in the town government. Here he established himself as a lawyer.

== Dutch envoy to South Africa ==
In 1855, King Willem III of the Netherlands appointed Hiddingh his special envoy to the newly formed Boer republics the Orange Free State and Transvaal. The main purpose of Hidding's visit to the Orange Free State was to present a flag and coat of arms as a gift from King Willem III to the government and people of the Orange Free State.

The initiative for the design and production of the flag and coat of arms came from State President Josias Philip Hoffman and Government Secretary Jacobus Groenendaal. However, by the time Hiddingh arrived, a new state president, Jacobus Boshoff, had taken office. Apparently unaware that state symbols were being designed in the Netherlands, Boshoff had a Great Seal designed and approved by the Volksraad. In order not to offend the British government, he hesitated to receive Hiddingh and his symbols in an official capacity. In response, Groenendaal and Landdrost Johan Arnold Smellekamp began a press offensive against Boshoff in newspapers in both Bloemfontein and Cape Town, condemning Boshoff for this action. Boshoff had no choice but to dismiss both officials. As a compromise, the Dutch design was added to the coat of arms that had already been adopted. After his successful mission to South Africa earned Hiddingh the gratitude of the King and government in the form of a knighthood in the Order of the Netherlands Lion.

The Dutch government had also charged Hiddingh with another diplomatic mission. He was asked to discreetly inform the government of the Orange Free State that Orange Free State consul Ulrich Lauts was not suited to represent the republic in Europe, and propose a replacement. Hiddingh had Jacob Spengler in mind, president of the Amsterdam Chamber of Commerce. The Volksraad adopted the proposal and decided to offer Spengler the position. However, State President Boshoff did not give a follow-up to the decision, and consequently Spengler was never appointed or even asked.

Hiddingh continued his trip with a visit to the South African Republic. His opinion about that country and its government was probably already negatively influenced by Smellekamp, who had left the Transvaal under a cloud several years before, and with whom Hiddingh had lodged in Bloemfontein. Hiddingh avoided a meeting with state president M.W. Pretorius and demonstrated a lack of understanding about the character of the South African Republic, its government, and people in the report about his trip.

== Consul-General of the Orange Free State ==
Between 1856 and 1861 the Consulate Generalship remained vacant, although the Dutch government and others regarded Hiddingh as their semi-official contact with the republic. On 10 September 1861, the government of the Orange Free State appointed Hiddingh consul general of the Orange Free State in the Kingdom of the Netherlands. The Royal Decree with his acceptance was issued on 27 November 1861. Again, as with Lauts, the Volksraad was not asked to ratify the appointment, a judicial mistake only repaired three years later, on 8 February 1864. The consulate was established in Arnhem, Hiddingh's residence at the time.

Hiddingh's life came to a sudden and untimely end when he was killed in a train accident in his hometown, Arnhem, Netherlands in September 1871.
