= George Cusack =

17th-century Irish pirate

Occupation
- Activity sectors: Piracy

Description
- Competencies: Gunner, sailor and captain
- Fields of employment: Privateer (fl. 1668–1675)

George Cusack
- Died: 18 January 1675; Great Britain

George Cusack (died 18 January 1675) was an Irish pirate active in northern Europe and the West Indies in the late 17th century.

== History ==
Cusack served as a gunner and sailor on several ships but his attempts at mutiny landed him in Marshalsea prison for a time. On his release in 1668 he traveled to Cádiz and signed aboard the Hopewell out of Tangier as a gunner. He and several associates mutinied and seized the ship, setting the officers adrift in a rowboat. They renamed the vessel Valiant Prince and had a forced merchant draw up false papers for it. Cusack also had Articles written out which he had his crew swear to, generally referred to as his "Obligations." He threw out the previous captain's papers to avoid incriminating himself in piracy.

He even threw out the ship's Bible; as the captured merchant Thomas Power recalled, Cusack “could not be perswaded to save a great large Bible that constantly lay upon the great Cabbin Table, from the mercy of the Waves, which whiles some of his own Crew endeavoured to perswade him to, he replyed, ‘You Cowards, what do you think to go to Heaven and do such Actions as these? No, I will make you Officers in Hell under me’; and with that threw the Bible out at the great Cabbin window, saying ‘Go thou thy way Divinity, what have we to do with thee?’”

They sailed to the Leeward Islands and tried to take several small vessels but soon were captured while ashore, ending up imprisoned in Barbados. They escaped and captured a 250-ton 28-gun frigate they named Flying Devil, which they sailed up the East Coast of the United States before abandoning it and sailing back to England aboard smaller boats.

Cusack then served as a privateer for the Kingdom of England during the Anglo-Dutch Wars, taking several Dutch prizes. When those conflicts ended in 1674 he falsely obtained a French commission to hunt Spanish and Dutch ships. He kept a small crew, forcing sailors to serve as needed, including his surgeon Jacob Marrelly.

With only 23 men he took a cargo ship leaving Norway, a 500-ton vessel called Saint Anne out of London under Captain Shorter. Cusack and his pirates put the ship's crew aboard a pink they had taken earlier as a prize, leaving them no gear or provisions, and set them adrift.

They put into Aberdeen to sell the Saint Anne, claiming it was a Dutch ship they had found abandoned, and hid its paperwork to conceal their crime. Unfortunately for Cusack the crew they had set adrift was picked up by a passing merchantman and returned to Norfolk. They spread news of Cusack's piracy and the Saint Anne was seized.

Cusack and his men heard of this and avoided Aberdeen, sailing up the Thames to Lee to clean their ship. They spent their booty in local towns, who were glad to have the money, but which gave away their presence. They were pursued by local marshals and two armed vessels under Colonel Kennedy, who captured them and delivered Cusack back to Marshalsea prison with his crew. Cusack successfully escaped from prison three days before his trial, but was recaptured in Holborn the day that the court was scheduled to sit. He was reportedly arrested while in bed with a woman, who was believed to be his sister.

At the start of his trial, Cusack argued that the jury should be dismissed because it was composed of "Citizens; who did not (he said) understand Maritime-Affairs", demanding that he and his crew be tried by "men of their own trade", by which he was understood to mean fellow pirates. Cusack claimed to the Admiralty court that he had a commission, and when challenged tried to explain that his invalid commission was a mistake. The Court noted that valid or not, no commission would have allowed him to rob an English vessel, and he was convicted. He was executed on 18 January 1675 with thirteen of his crew, the rest acquitted for having been forced into piracy.

== Obligations ==
Cusack's pirate code, or Articles, are one of the very few pirate articles preserved from the 17th and 18th centuries, and one of only two complete sets from the 17th century (the other belonging to Nicholas Clough). As reported, they read:

"...declaring their resolution of running away with the Ships and Cargo, and of taking or sinking all Ships or Vessels they should meet with belonging to any Nation, English only excepted: promising to all persons aboard that joyned with them, their proportion and shares of the Ship and Cargo; together with all other Ships they should afterwards take or surprize, according to the Lawes of Pleron: to which end he ordered to be drawn up in Writing an Obligation to himself as Captain, and the said Parslow as Lieutenant, expressing the Resolutions of the Subscribers upon their Oaths to live and die with them in this their present design..."

== See also ==
- Rolls of Oléron – the 12th century laws regarding maritime conduct which Cusack referred to as the "Lawes of Pleron", and which may have formed the basis of Cusack's and other pirate articles.
- Jean Charpin – A French 17th century pirate whose Articles have also been preserved.
