= Jean Fantin =

French buccaneer

Jean Fantin (fl. 1681–1689) was a French pirate active in the Caribbean and off the coast of Africa. He is best known for having his ship stolen by William Kidd and Robert Culliford.

== History ==
The ship Le Trompeuse (The Trickster) passed through several pirate and privateer hands in its career, including Laurens de Graaf, Pierre le Pain, and eventually Jean Hamlin. In 1681 Jean Fantin was aboard when Le Pain put Trompeuse into Jamaica. By 1684 he had switched ships, serving under Dutch buccaneer Jan “Yankee” Willems. Alongside Jacob Evertson they were active off Panama, Venezuela, and Honduras in the intervening years, absorbing some of Jean Hamlin's former crew as well. Willems dropped Fantin and others off at Roatan in early 1688 and may have died shortly afterwards.

Some of Willems’ crew continued on to serve under George Peterson. Fantin and a few others were instead picked up from Roatan by Jean Charpin aboard the frigate Sainte Rose, a former Spanish ship which had also been part of de Graaf's flotilla. Also aboard were William Kidd and Robert Culliford, picked up at Île-à-Vache, two of the few Englishmen among an almost entirely French crew. There in early 1689 they captured a heavily laden Dutch ship under a privateering commission. Charpin sailed back to New England to sell off their cargo and resupply. The crew deposed Charpin from command and elected Fantin as captain.

They sailed to the west coast of Africa, joining up with the ship Le Hasardeux of French buccaneer Jean-Baptiste du Casse at the Cape Verde Islands. Du Casse led them back toward the Caribbean; en route they caught a lone Spanish frigate which had sailed from Havana. Du Casse wanted its treasure but his privateering commission only allowed him to attack the Dutch. Fantin had no commission and so he took the Sainte Rose to capture the Spanish ship, transferring to it afterwards.

Du Casse led a raid on the Dutch colony at Surinam but was repulsed with heavy losses. He attacked Berbice nearby but was stopped and departed with little gain. Some of du Casse's crew began to argue over division of the treasure from the Spanish frigate. England and France declared war in the meantime and so du Casse turned his attention to English colonies, attacking St. Christopher in the summer of 1689. Fantin, reinforced with fresh troops from Martinique, joined du Casse for the land assault. While he was ashore Kidd, Culliford, and the other Englishmen surprised and murdered the few French sailors left aboard and sailed off in the ship, which they took to Nevis and renamed the Blessed William.

After the attack on St. Christopher the buccaneers went their separate ways, Fantin leaving with 70 men aboard a brigantine, while Charpin's former quartermaster Mathurin Desmarestz bought a ship of his own and sailed with many of the remaining French. Little is recorded of Fantin's later activities, though the fates of two of his ships are known. The Sainte Rose ended up beached during du Casse's expedition, and the ex-Spanish Blessed William – stolen from Fantin by Kidd and Culliford – was in turn stolen from Kidd by Culliford, who grew weary of privateering and land attacks with little reward and turned to outright piracy.

== See also ==
- King William's War, the conflict that reignited privateering between the English and French.
