= Jan Willem Spruyt =

Schoolteacher, South African civil servant, law agent

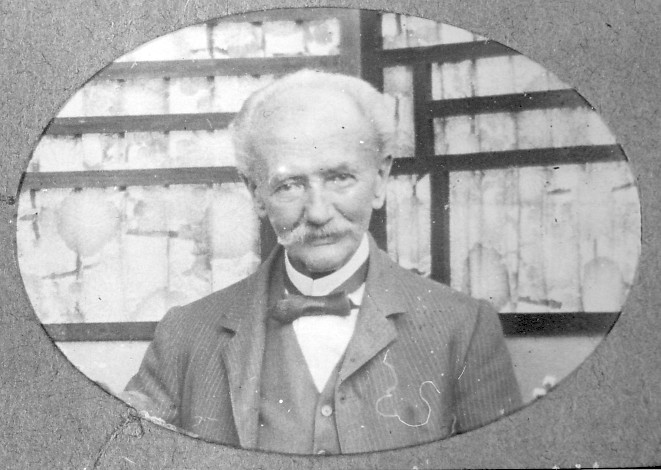
- Jan Willem Landskroon Spruyt

Government Secretary of the Orange Free State
- In office January 1856 – 1862

Acting State President of the Orange Free State
- In office 1860... – ...1862 (intermittent)
- Preceded by: M.W. Pretorius
- Succeeded by: M.W. Pretorius

State Secretary of the South African Republic
- In office November 1866 – 1869

Personal details
- Born: 4 July 1826 Uithoorn, Netherlands
- Died: 8 September 1908 (aged 82) Inanda, Natal
- Profession: Schoolteacher, civil servant, law agent

Jan Willem Spruyt (4 July 1826 – 8 September 1908), also known as Jan Willem Spruijt and Jan Willem Landskroon Spruijt (birthname), was a South African civil servant, lawyer and statesman of Dutch descent. Spruyt was government secretary (1856–1862) and several times acting state president of the Orange Free State, and state secretary of the South African Republic (1866–1869).

Spruyt grew up in the Netherlands, studied law, but did not complete his studies, and worked as a schoolteacher, before coming to South Africa. Here he practised as law agent in private practice in both Boer republics. Soon after his arrival he was also quickly enrolled in the administration of the Orange Free State, and attained a powerful position as government secretary. In this capacity he stood in for state president M.W. Pretorius several times in the period 1860–1862. In the third quarter of the nineteenth century several many Afrikaner politicians and government officials served in both Boer republics. So did Spruyt, who finished his career as state secretary of the South African Republic.

== Biography ==
=== Early life and migration ===
Spruyt was the son of Jacobus Spuyt (1796–1839), a Dutch medical doctor, and Antje Landskroon. Both the Spruyt and Landskroon families stood in a tradition of medical practice, and three of the four brothers Spruyt had were doctors in the Netherlands. Spruyt himself trained as a lawyer at Leiden University, but probably did not finish his studies. He went on to work as a schoolteacher in the village of Oosterwolde in the north of the Netherlands. It was here that professor U.G. Lauts recruited him for South Africa in 1851. Lauts was one of a group of Dutchmen, interested in the development of good education in the new Boer settlements in South Africa. As such, Spruyt was one of the many Dutch immigrants that settled in the new Boer republics around the middle of the nineteenth century.

Arriving in Delagoa Bay on a ship with J.A. Smellekamp as supercargo – he later became a well-known figure in South Africa – and his two travel companions and fellow migrants, Hendrik van der Linden and W.P.J. Poen, he travelled across the Lebombo Mountains in an ox-cart into the Transvaal. In March 1852 Spruyt was appointed schoolteacher in the town of Rustenburg. Because of disputes among the Dutchmen in the Transvaal, more specifically between Rev. Dirk van der Hoff and J.A. Smellekamp, who had now also settled there, Spruyt moved to the Orange Free State, where he established himself in Bloemfontein.

=== Civil servant in the Orange Free State ===
In Bloemfontein Spruyt worked as clerk of the Landdrost (1854–1855), and in that capacity he acted as secretary of the Volksraad on two occasions (September 1854 and February 1855), also filling in as Government Secretary. On the strength of his capacities Spruyt was appointed clerk to the State President in September 1855. Soon after, during the illness of Government Secretary Groenendaal, Spruyt again took up that position. In October 1856 he was appointed to the vacancy and succeeded J. Groenendaal as Government Secretary of the Orange Free State. Spruyt was regarded by his colleagues as an accurate civil servant, but as a lesser politician and statesman, reason that he was not appointed Acting State President when State President Boshoff went on leave in 1858. However, Boshoff trusted Spruyt fully, and he allowed him to represent the presidency in meetings of the Volksraad on several occasions in 1861 and 1862.

Later Spruyt acted as State President during the absences of President Pretorius from Bloemfontein. Although general opinion had it that Spruyt was a man of lesser qualities, on his resignation he was praised by State President Pretorius as very loyal and accurate in his work.

As civil servant, Spruyt made an impact on the nascent state apparatus of the Orange Free State. He designed the coat of arms of the state, and laid the foundation of the model state the Orange Free State was to become in later years. Having worked in secretarial functions for the State President himself (as clerk), but also as a servant of parliament, the government, and the State, Spruyt left a clear mark on the early administration and its organisation. Spruyt was also sensitive to good labour relations within the state apparatus, and propagated a rise in the officials' salaries. In this he did not succeed, however, and eventually the matter of the salaries instigated his own resignation. Spruyt felt that his salary was insufficient to live on with a family, and tendered his resignation.

=== Law agent, publisher, state secretary ===
After his resignation he established himself as law agent (wetsagent) in Bloemfontein, and acted as publisher of the Dutch language weekly paper De Tijd. Staatkundig Nieuws- en Advertentieblad voor den Oranje-Vrijstaat (The Times. Political Newspaper and Advertiser for the Orange Free State), started by H.A.L. Hamelberg as a competitor to the English language newspaper The Friend.

In 1865 Spruyt was declared insolvent, and he subsequently moved back to the Transvaal. Here the government of the South African Republic appointed him State Secretary in November 1866 on the advice of State President Pretorius. This appointment lasted till 1869.

In 1870 Spruyt returned to the Orange Free State and to private law practice. He established himself in Ladybrand, a territory conquered by the Orange Free State in the last Basotho War of 1867. His insolvency kept following him, however, and as late as 1871 some of his possessions, including a building complex in Rustenburg, were publicly sold for a minute sum of money.

Efforts to regain a public position in the Orange Free State failed, and in 1888 Spruyt once more returned to the South African Republic. He was allowed to work as law agent in the lower courts, and – being well-known and popular – set up a successful law practice. Until the end of his life he kept a healthy interest in the affairs of the state, especially in land cases.

In the last period of his life Spruyt lived in Troyeville, Johannesburg. He died while on a visit to Natal, aged 82.

=== Family ===
Spruyt married in Bloemfontein on 31 December 1856 with Elizabeth Emma Hanger (1826–1918), originating from Peddie in the Cape Colony. The couple had five sons and five daughters, Emma, William, Gerard, Victor, Henrietta, George, Rudolf, Alicia, Elizabeth and Catherine.
