= Governance in 18th-century piracy =

Organization of the pirates of the 18th century

Pirates of the Golden Age of Piracy were organized criminals. As well as having crew members assigned certain duties, pirates found a way to reduce conflict among themselves and maximize profits. They used a democratic system, spelled out by written "articles of agreement", to limit the captain's power and to keep order on board the ship.

== Roles and duties on a pirate ship ==
The captain was elected by all the men in the crew and could be replaced by a majority vote by the same. Cowardly or brutal captains were quickly voted out of their position. Captains were expected to be skilled and dependable seamen. They were also expected to be bold and decisive leaders since they made the most important decisions including how to engage a target, how to pursue prey, how to escape the authorities and how to deal with an attack. In the latter situations, there was no time for taking a vote and settling conflicting opinions.

The quartermaster had the same authority as a captain (except during battle). The crew elected him to represent their interests. He commanded the crew during absence of the captain. His other jobs included keeping order, settling conflicts between crew members and determining the amount of food and drink distributed to each crew member.

The sailing master oversaw the navigation and sailing of the ship. Often, because of their skills, they were forced into service for pirates. The boatswain took care of the boat by supervising supplies, inspecting the ship every morning and reporting the condition of the ship to the captain. He also supervised deck activities, including the handling of the sails and the weighing and dropping of the anchor. The carpenter, under the boatswain and quartermaster's directions, repaired the ship. Sometimes the carpenter would also be the surgeon on the ship. The master gunner ensured that the cannons and weapons were in working order. The mate (often there were first and second mates) usually worked under the ship's master, boatswain, gunner or carpenter as an apprentice. Mates also outfitted the ship with ropes, pulleys, sails and other rigging as needed.

=== Other roles ===
The common sailor would be familiar with the rigging, sails and the steering of the ship. They kept watches and handled cannons during battle. A rigger worked the running rigging and furled and released sails. Young boys or men on a pirate ship were often servants known as cabin boys. During battles, powder monkeys ran gunpowder from below deck to cannon crews and also relayed messages.

=== Organization on board ===
Watches were kept all day long. There was a larboard (left side) watch and a starboard (right side) watch; the quartermaster ran one watch, the sailing master the other. Most watches were four hours long except for the two dog watches, which were two hours long. The shorter watches prevented crew members from ending up with the same watch day after day.

The quarter bill, which listed duties in battle, was written before any battles took place and posted in a public place on the ship. During an actual battle, most of the crew stayed flat on their stomachs, under cover, until the time came to engage with the target, with the exception of those commanding and sailing the vessel. Once the target was close enough, the captain often remained on the quarterdeck, poop deck or near the tiller. The sailing master, boatswain and mates managed the sailing of the vessel while the rest of the crew handled small arms or took responsibility for the cannons. A gun crew was responsible for two cannons, one on the starboard and its opposite cannon on the larboard). Ship's boys carried cartridges and gunpowder up to the deck.

== Articles of agreement ==
Pirate articles were based on the chasse-partie created on buccaneer ships in the 17th century. The chasse-partie determined the division of plunder among the crew as well as other rules. 18th-century pirates built upon this concept and created their own version of "Articles of Agreement." Before setting out on their expedition, pirates wrote their articles alongside the election of a captain or quartermaster. The articles needed the consent of every crew member, and "all [pirates] swore to 'em" sometimes on a Bible or whatever was at hand. During the election of a new captain, men who wanted another leader often drew up separate articles and sailed away from their former crew-mates. Pirate democracy was flexible but unable to deal with long-term dissent from the crew.

One description of the ritual of the pirate's code was in Alexandre Exquemelin's Buccaneers of America, published in 1678. Pirates called a first council (which included all crew members) to decide where to get provisions. Then they raided for supplies. Afterward, food rations were determined (with the captain receiving no more than any man). A second council decided on the articles of agreement, which were put in writing.

These articles of agreement served four purposes:

- They specifically designated shares of the plunder for each crew member. Shares of the plunder were spelled out on the basis of each crew member's skills and duties. Captain and quartermaster typically received one and a half or two shares; gunners, boatswains, shipmates, carpenters, and doctors typically received one and a quarter or one and a half shares, and all others one share each. Some of the plunder went into a "common fund" to provide for severely injured men (who had lost their sight or their limbs). This, in turn, promoted loyalty among the crew because they knew they would be taken care of. If the value of the plunder was questionable, they would sell it before dividing the money among themselves. This prevented conflict between crew members and also prevented the quartermaster from hoarding the most valuable items.
- The articles prohibited activities that would cause conflict between crew members, such as excessive drinking, gambling, stealing, and bringing women (or boys) on board. Some, like Bartholomew Roberts' articles, also prevented crew members from settling arguments with duels while on board the ship.
- They outlined punishments for various offenses. Punishments included marooning, whipping, slitting of ears and noses, and for severe crimes, death.
- They created rules for the general safety of the ship. Usually, articles also required members to keep their weapons in good working order. Also, since fire was especially dangerous on ships, some pirate articles forbade activities such as firing guns or smoking in areas of the ship that carried flammable goods, such as gunpowder.

Articles also described incentives like bonuses for productive crew members and thus discouraged each man from allowing everyone else to pick up the slack.

== Two examples of pirate articles ==
Bartholomew Roberts' articles on the Royal Fortune (1720)

1. Every Man has a Vote in Affairs of Moment; has equal title to the fresh Provisions, or strong Liquors, at any Time seized, and use of them at Pleasure unless a Scarcity…make it necessary, for the good of all, to Vote a Retrenchment [economizing].
2. Every Man to be called fairly in turn, by Lift, on Board of Prizes, because, [over and above their proper share] they were on these Occasions allowed a shift of Cloaths: But if they defrauded the Company to the Value of a Dollar, in Plate, Jewels or Money, MAROONING was their Punishment. If the Robbery was only between one another, they contented themselves with slitting the Ears or Nose of him that was Guilty, and set him on shore, not in an uninhabited Place, but somewhere, where he was sure to encounter Hardships.
3. No Person to Game at Cards or Dice for Money
4. The Lights and Candles to be put out at eight o’Clock at Night: If any of the Crew, after that Hour, still remained inclin’d for Drinking, they were to do it on the open Deck.
5. To keep their Piece, Pistols, and Cutlass clean, and fit for Service.
6. No Boy or Woman to be allowed amongst them. If any Man were found seducing any of the latter Sex, and carried her to Sea, disguised, he was to suffer Death.
7. To Desert the Ship, or their Quarters in Battle, was punished with Death, or Marooning.
8. No striking one another on Board, but every Man’s Quarrels to be ended on Shore, at Sword and Pistol.
9. No Man to talk of breaking up their Way of Living, till each had shared 1000 pounds. If in order to this, any Man should lose a Limb, or become a Cripple in their Service, he was to have 800 Dollars, out of the publick Stock, and for lesser Hurts, proportionably.
10. The Captain and the Quarter-master to receive two Shares of a Prize; the Master, Boatswain, and Gunner, one Share and a half, and other Officers, one and a Quarter.
11. The Musicians to have Rest on the Sabbath Day, but the other Six Days and Nights, none, without special Favour.

In 1723, a man named John Phillips and four companions seized a schooner owned by William Minott of Boston. They named the ship the Revenge, chose officers and swore to their articles on a hatchet, since they did not have a Bible:

1. Every Man shall obey civil Command; the Captain shall have one full Share and a half in all Prizes; the Master, Carpenter, Boatswain and Gunner shall have one Share and quarter.
2. If any Man shall offer to run away, or keep any Secret from the Company, he shall be maroon’d, with one Bottle of Powder, one Bottle of Water, one small Arm and Shot.
3. If any Man shall steal any Thing in the Company, or game to the Value of a Piece of Eight, he shall be maroon’d or shot.
4. If at any Time we should meet another Marrooner [pirate], that Man that shall sign his Articles without the Consent of our Company, shall suffer such Punishment as the Captain and Company shall think fit.
5. That Man that shall strike another whilst these Articles are in force, shall receive Moses's Law (that is, 40 Stripes lacking one) on the bare Back.
6. That Man that shall snap his Arms, or [smoke] Tobacco in the Hold, without a Cap to his Pipe, or carry a Candle lighted without a Lanthorn, shall suffer the same Punishment as in the former Article.
7. That Man that shall not keep his Arms clean, fit for an Engagement, or neglect his Business, shall be cut off from his Share, and suffer such other Punishment as the Captain and the Company shall think fit.
8. If any Man shall lose a Joint in Time of Engagement, he shall have 400 Pieces of Eight, if a Limb, 800.
9. If at any Time we meet with a prudent Woman, that Man that offers to meddle with her, without her Consent, shall suffer present Death.

Anything not covered in the articles would be settled by crew members, who would act as a type of judiciary body to interpret the articles and apply them to the situations not found in the articles. For the most part, pirates strictly followed their articles. It appears that “pirates were more orderly, peaceful and well-organized among themselves than many of the colonies, merchant ships, or vessels of the Royal Navy.”

== Counter-culture to normal maritime life and labor ==
Piracy was usually voluntarily chosen, and it was a way of life that challenged the society pirates left behind. Most pirates came from the lowest social classes and went out to sea in search of a better life as well as loot and treasure. As well as these pragmatic and economic reasons, the "spirit of revolt against common oppressors", the oppressors being the governments and societies of nations, helped create pirate democracy. Pirate democracy was a counter-culture, created by common sailors, to the traditional organization of maritime life and labor.

On most merchant and Navy vessels, there was a hierarchy with captains holding the highest authority, then officers and at the bottom, ordinary sailors. On these ships, a captain had complete control over every aspect of life on his ship, including the division of food, wages, labor assignment and discipline. Thus, it was easy for a captain to become abusive and use his authority to take advantage of his crew. John Archer, who sailed with Edward Teach, before his execution explained his stint as a pirate: "I could wish that Masters of Vessels would not use their Men with so much Severity, as many of them do, which exposes us to many Temptations."

Colonel Benjamin Bennet wrote of pirates to the Council of Trade and Plantations in 1718: "I fear they will soon multiply for so many are willing to joyn with them when taken." Sailors on seized ships joined pirates because of the appealing "prospect of plunder and 'ready money,' the food and the drink, the camaraderie, the democracy, equality, and justice, and the promise of care for the injured."

Another appeal of piracy came in the limiting of the captain's power over the crew. Pirate Francis Kennedy puts it succinctly: "most pirates, 'having suffered formerly from the ill-treatment of their officers, provided carefully against such evil' once they arranged their own command." Thus, pirate democracy came with a series of checks and balances that protected the rights of the crew.

== Checks and balances ==
Piratical checks and balances proved quite successful. According to Captain Charles Johnson, owing to the institution of the quartermaster, aboard pirate ships "the Captain can undertake nothing which the Quarter-Master does not approve. We may say, the Quarter-Master is a humble Imitation of the Roman Tribune of the People; he speaks for, and looks after the Interest of the Crew."

The dual executive was a distinctive feature of pirate organization. A quartermaster, along with the captain, was elected by the crew. The presence of the quartermaster divided the immediate authority on the ship into two, so one man couldn't have complete control over the crew. Also, the captain had to keep in mind that he only ruled because his crew allowed him to. A captain could be pulled from his position by a majority vote of the crew for various reasons, including: cowardice, poor judgment, abusive or controlling behavior (called predation) and other behavior that the crew believed infringed on their interests. The captain also lived like the rest of the crew; he had no privileges in lodgings or food and drink.

However, the ultimate, highest authority on the ship was the pirate council, a group that included every man on the ship. The council determined where to go for the best prizes and how arguments were to be resolved. Also, discipline was dealt out on the basis on "what Punishment the Captain and the Majority of the Company [believed] fit."

Pirates took their democracy beyond their ship as well. Upon seizing a prize, pirates administered the "distribution of justice" and asked the crew of the captured ship about their captain's nature. If the crew complained that their captain had been cruel, the pirates tortured and then executed the captain. A kind captain was often released and rewarded.

== Forced labour ==
Not all people on board were there voluntarily or had voting rights. Almost all pirate ships would have a considerable amount of forced labourers on board (usually 10%-60%). Typically captives from ships that refused to join and sign the code, but were of some use to the crew. These were practically slaves and did not have voting rights.

== Brotherhood on the seas ==
For the most part, Western pirates did not prey on one another and were always willing to help out fellow pirates. For example, in April 1719, Howell Davis and his crew sailed into the Sierra Leone River, alarming the pirates commanded by Thomas Cocklyn until they saw the Jolly Roger. After a while, they saluted each other with cannon. Other crews “often invoked an unwritten code of hospitality to forge spontaneous alliances.”

The Jolly Roger, the most famous symbol of every pirate's experience of death, violence and limited time on Earth, was used to terrify targets but also to identify fellow pirates. Pirate fraternity was further expressed by threats and acts of revenge against nations targeting pirates.

== The dream of Libertalia ==
"Pirates and other social bandits adopted social mechanisms which can be summarized as libertarian, democratic, federal, egalitarian, fraternal, and communal of ownership. It may well be argued that these 'floating commonwealths' are examples of a form of pre-Enlightenment radicalism." They were also far less conscious of national, religious and racial differences than what was common.

In the second volume of A General History of the Pyrates (published 1728), Captain Charles Johnson tells the tale of Captain Mission and his pirates, who established a utopian republic on the island of Madagascar. They called it “Libertalia,” where societies would be based on the ideals of liberty, equality and fraternity. Mission's pirates were determined to guard the common people's rights, fight the power of monarchies and allow people to make and judge their own laws and elect and rotate their leaders. They chose a council without distinguishing between nationality or race. They opposed labor and condemned slavery. The tale goes that Mission and his men integrated slaves from captured ships into their society as well.

However, Captain Mission and Libertalia probably never existed except as an expression of the "living traditions, practices and dreams of an Atlantic working class, many of which were observed, synthesized and translated into discourse by the author of A General History of Pyrates…[which also included] utopian practices of the early 18th century pirate ship."

Nevertheless, in 1713, English pirates Thomas Barrow and Benjamin Hornigold did proclaim themselves the governors of a tangible pirate republic on the island of New Providence in the Bahamas. They were joined by pirate captains such as Charles Vane, Thomas Burgess, John Rackham and Blackbeard. However, this republic was soon eliminated in 1718 by Captain Woodes Rogers with his appointment as the Royal Governor of the Bahamas.

The English ruling class recognized the influence of Libertalia and its alternative social order, and they soon put their efforts into quashing it. There were worries of a pirate "Commonwealth" (such as the one Barrow and Hornigold set up), especially one in areas where no nation would be able to fight them. English rulers responded by hanging sea robbers by the hundreds, and the English Parliament passed new legislation persecuting pirates. Finally, with the hanging of Captain Bartholomew Roberts' men at Cape Coast Castle on the African coast in 1722, the Golden Age of Piracy was brought to an end.

== Sources ==
- Antony, Robert J. 2007. Pirates in the Age of Sail. New York: W. W. Norton & Co.
- Cordingly, David. 1996. Pirates : Terror on the High Seas, from the Caribbean to the South China Sea. Atlanta; Kansas City, Mo.: Turner Pub.; Distributed by Andrews and McMeel.
- Cordingly, David. 1996. Under the Black Flag : The Romance and the Reality of Life Among the Pirates. New York: Random House.
- Johnson, David E. 2002. Review: Of Pirates, Captives, Barbarians, and the Limits of Culture. American Literary History 14 (2) (Summer): pp. 358–375.
- Leeson, Peter T. 2007. An-arrgh-chy: The Law and Economics of Pirate Organization. The Journal of Political Economy 115 (6) (Dec.): pp. 1049–1094, doi:10.1086/526403
- Little, Benerson. 2007. The Buccaneer's Realm: Pirate Life on the Spanish Main, 1674–1688. Washington, D.C: Potomac Books.
- Ossian, Robert. "Roles and Duties On Board a Ship." Pirate's Cove, Available from http://www.thepirateking.com/historical/ship_roles.htm (accessed November 27, 2010).
- Rediker, Marcus. 1981. "Under the Banner of King Death": The Social World of Anglo-American pirates, 1716 to 1726. The William and Mary Quarterly 38 (2) (Apr.): pp. 203–227.
