= Nicholas Clough =

Nicholas Clough (fl. 1682-1683) was a merchant captain, slave trader, and pirate active in the Caribbean and off the coast of Africa. He is best remembered for leaving behind a well-documented Pirate Code, his "Articles of Agreement".

== History ==
The Camelion was a Royal African Company ship out of London. Under Captain Nicholas Clough it set sail in 1682 to trade slaves at Old Calabar, then crossed the Atlantic to trade and transport them to Barbados, Montserrat, and Nevis. They were scheduled to return to London in June 1682 with a cargo of sugar and other goods.

On June 29 Clough and supporters seized the ship off Nevis. They took a number of prisoners aboard and had the crew sign their Articles. After sailing to Curacao to sell off the ship’s cargo, they sailed up the American east coast in August to Sandy Hook to sell the ship itself.

They were imprisoned and put on trial in September 1683; eight of the crew were found guilty by the Court of Admiralty, sentenced to whipping and a year’s imprisonment. A number of others were determined to have been forced into piracy and were acquitted; trial depositions repeatedly note that Clough made them sign the Articles "with his sword in his hands." Others reported being threatened with marooning if they refused to sign. Clough himself was sent back to London as a prisoner aboard the Camelion to answer to the Royal African Company.

== Articles of Agreement ==
Clough’s Pirate code, or Articles, are preserved in documents presented at his trial. They are one of only nine sets of pirate articles preserved from the 17th and 18th centuries, and one of only two complete sets from the 17th century (the other being the "Obligations" of George Cusack). They were drawn up by crewman John Copping at Clough’s orders, and were signed or marked by all present.

June the 30th day, 1683. Articles of Agreement between us abord of the Camillion, Nich. Clough Comander, that wee are to dispose of all the goods thatt are abord amongst us, every man are to have his full due and right share only the Commander is to have two shares and a half a share for the Ship and [whom] the Captain please to take for the Master under him is to have a share and a half. Now Gentlemen these are to satisfy you, as for the Doctor a Share and half, and these are our Articles that wee do all stand to as well as [one] and all.

These are to satisfy you thatt our intent is to trade with the Spaniards, medling nor make no resistances with no nation that wee do fall with all upon the Sea. Now Gentlemen these are to give you notice that if any one do make any Resistances against us one any factory [sic] hereafter shall bee severely punish according to the fact that hee hath comitted and as you are all here at present you have taken your corporall oath upon the holy Evangelists to stand one by the other as long as life shall last.

== See also ==
- Jean Charpin - A French 17th century pirate whose Articles have also been preserved.
