= George Peterson (pirate) =

American pirate

- Occupation: Pirate
- Years active: 1686–1688
- Piratical career
- Base of operations: New England and Nova Scotia and in the West Indies

George Peterson (fl. 1686–1688) was a pirate active off New England and Nova Scotia and in the West Indies.

== History ==
Peterson was a known pirate by 1686 when he was sighted near Newport, Colony of Rhode Island and Providence Plantations, where he put in to resupply his ship. He reappeared at Newport in 1688 in a 10-gun 70-man Spanish barca longa. Part of his crew consisted of the remnants of the crews of Jean Hamlin and two recently deceased pirates, Jan "Yankey" Willems and Jacob Evertson. Peterson was seized by local authorities and put on trial for piracy. His friends and neighbors made up enough of the grand jury that they refused to indict him or the traders who had helped him. He sold off prize ships he’d captured in the Caribbean as well as loot he had plundered, including hides and elephant tusks.

Some of his men were detained in Boston, and two ships which had traded with Peterson were impounded, one of which had helped guide a prize ship of Peterson's into Martha's Vineyard. Avoiding the warship HMS Rose which had been sent to chase him, Peterson headed north toward Newfoundland where he burned the prize ship and took its crew aboard. He took several ships in the vicinity and held the Governor aboard his ship for a time after capturing and sacking the fort at Chebucto. At the Governor's request they left the fort's defenders enough arms and cannon to repulse Indian attacks.

Peterson then captured a French ship, releasing it with a message that "French rogues had no business with other people's vessels," and tried to free an English vessel which had been captured by the French. Fleeing HMS Rose once again, he released sailors he had taken from fishing vessels onto a captured ship. At last report he had collected a hundred men and a year's worth of supplies and prepared to sail to the Gold Coast.

== See also ==
- John Graham and Captain Veale, two other New England pirates active off Massachusetts.
