= Hydrarchy =

Ship structure or rule by water, Braithwaite's term

Hydrarchy, is the organizational structure of a ship, or the ability for individual(s) to gain power over land by ruling through the instrument of water, as defined by English poet Richard Braithwaite (1588–1673), who coined the term.

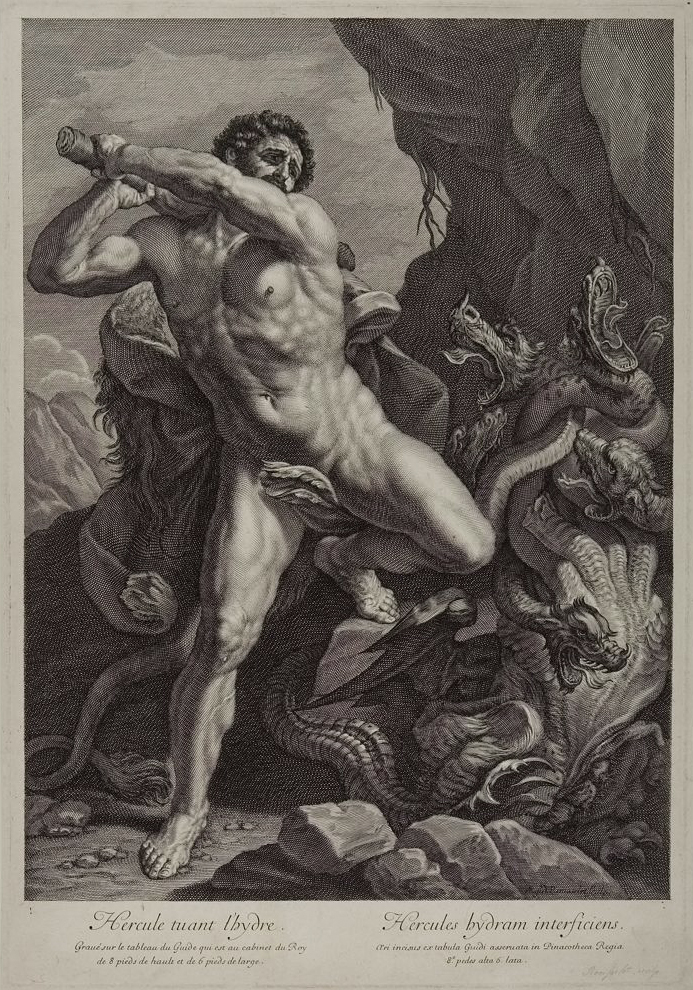
Engraving by Gilles Rousselet (17th century) Hercules slaying the many-headed Lernaean Hydra

The term is most commonly used to describe a maritime society or maritime history in the Atlantic world, concerning political, economic, and social tensions on the docks and ports and out at sea, between the mid sixteenth-century extending to the nineteenth. The term also attests to the resistant and rebellious sailors, slaves and other oppressed individuals who acted out against the "land" powers of the central imperial government, like England between the sixteenth and nineteenth centuries.

== Origins ==
The term's origins are found in its two syllables: Latin (archia) or the Greek ἄρχειν (archein) meaning “the rule of" and the Ancient Greek ῠ̔́δρη (húdrē) Ionic or hīdrə (hudra) meaning "water snake," as defined by the Oxford English Dictionary.

Hydra, also applies the Greek mythological sea monster representation. The Lernaean Hydra, is the "gigantic water-snake-like monster with nine heads (the number varies), one of which was immortal...Anyone who attempted to behead the Hydra found that as soon as one head was cut off, two more heads would emerge from the fresh wound," as defined by Encyclopædia Britannica.

The story of Greek hero, Hercules, includes the slaying of the Lernaean Hydra as his second labor. The hydra would arise from the depths of the sea and terrorize the land of Lerna. The immortality of the Lernaean made this feat nearly impossible, except Hercules and his nephew Iolaus defeated the monster by lighting each headless neck—that Hercules decapitated—afire to prevent the regrowth of numerous ones.

Scholars Peter Linebaugh and Marcus Rediker's expand upon Braithwaite's concept of hydrarchy in their text, The Many-Headed Hydra: Sailors, Slaves, Commoners, and the Hidden History of the Revolutionary Atlantic. The many-headed hydra stands as a symbolic representation of the multi-ethnic band of rebellious and resistant sailors seen as an imposing threat to the imperial powers who sought to exterminate them—dismember the many 'heads' of the hydra.

Encyclopædia Britannica also provides a modern application of the term, "In modern English, hydra or hydra-headed can describe a difficult or multifarious situation."

The contemporary recognition of the "terraqueous globe" has created a wave of research regarding many modern literary scholars overlook of the unique quality concerning the maritime society or the complexity of the hydrarchy, "Twentieth-century literary scholars suffered from hydrophobia (Origin: Late Latin, from Greek, from hydr- + -phobia; "morbid fear of water"): they too readily mapped the land onto the sea, imagining the ocean as a metaphor for landward practices." "The sea is an insurgent space: it violates and defies representational schemas through its liquidity, atemporality, and sheer uncontainability. The sea, according to Iain Chambers, evokes ‘‘the laboratory of another modernity, in which the hegemonic time and space of capital are viewed askance, diverted, and subverted."

== Historical context ==
=== Earliest unique maritime society ===
In the thirteenth century of Northern Europe, earlier representations of the term can be traced to conflict concerning the North and Baltic Seas. Specifically in the power structure implemented by the leader of privateers, Klaus Stortebeker. He led a fleet of pirates called the Victual Brothers. "Victual" (Origin: Latin vivo, means 'life')a band of brothers who perhaps sustained one another in their unity. They became involved in the Hanseatic League, an alliance of cities along Germany's northern coast—what made this alliance unique was their commercial alliance.

The Hanseatic League had their own military unit and their own ships. They were able to negotiate with sovereign kings that were treated as their equals. The Hansa could be considered one of the first practitioners of hydrarchy, which appeared and became widely used in 1630.The early seventeenth century marked a surge of expansion in regards to colonization and trade—especially across the Atlantic Ocean. The journey across the Atlantic consisted of and served a variety of purposes: a trade route for maritime privateers serving their nation state as well as a forced route of slave transportation. The journey also created a growing political and economic interest in the sea

== Contemporary scholarship and analysis ==
In 2000, Peter Linebaugh and Marcus Rediker explored the revolutionary term in their text. David Armitage reviewed Linebaugh and Rediker's text in 2001, and identified the existence of two forms of hydrarchy that were interrelated and equally-influential developments that occurred between the 1670s and the 1730s. perhaps due to the interdependent nature. Armitage points out Linebaugh and Rediker's identification of, “the organization of the maritime state from above, and the self-organization of sailors from below.”

The self-organization of sailors from below.” developed into an understanding and adherence to the pirate code or the distribution of justice. Although there was no exact uniform list of expectations as to how each individual ship would be managed, the characteristics of distributive justice enabled "the fair allocation of resources among diverse members of a community. Fair allocation typically takes into account the total amount of goods to be distributed, the distributing procedure, and the pattern of distribution that results."

This unique society, or "insurgent hydrarchy from below" consisted of castaways and slaves—a motley crew of sailors. Richard Braithwaite defined the seventeenth-century mariners of 1631 as, “necessary instruments are they, and agents of main importance in that Hydrarchy wherein they live; for the walls of the state could not subsist without them.”

The rapid development and rise of hydrarchy took place between 1670 and 1730 as a direct challenge to the development of capitalism and international trade led by Western powers in Europe—notably England.This self-organization was a radical form of political order that also had the tendency to manifest in other forms exhibiting violence and piracy, "The ship thus became both an engine of capitalism in the wake of the bourgeois revolution in England and a setting of resistance, a place to which and in which the ideas and practices of revolutionaries defeated and repressed by Cromwell then by King Charles escaped, re-formed, circulated, and persisted."

== Below-deck ==
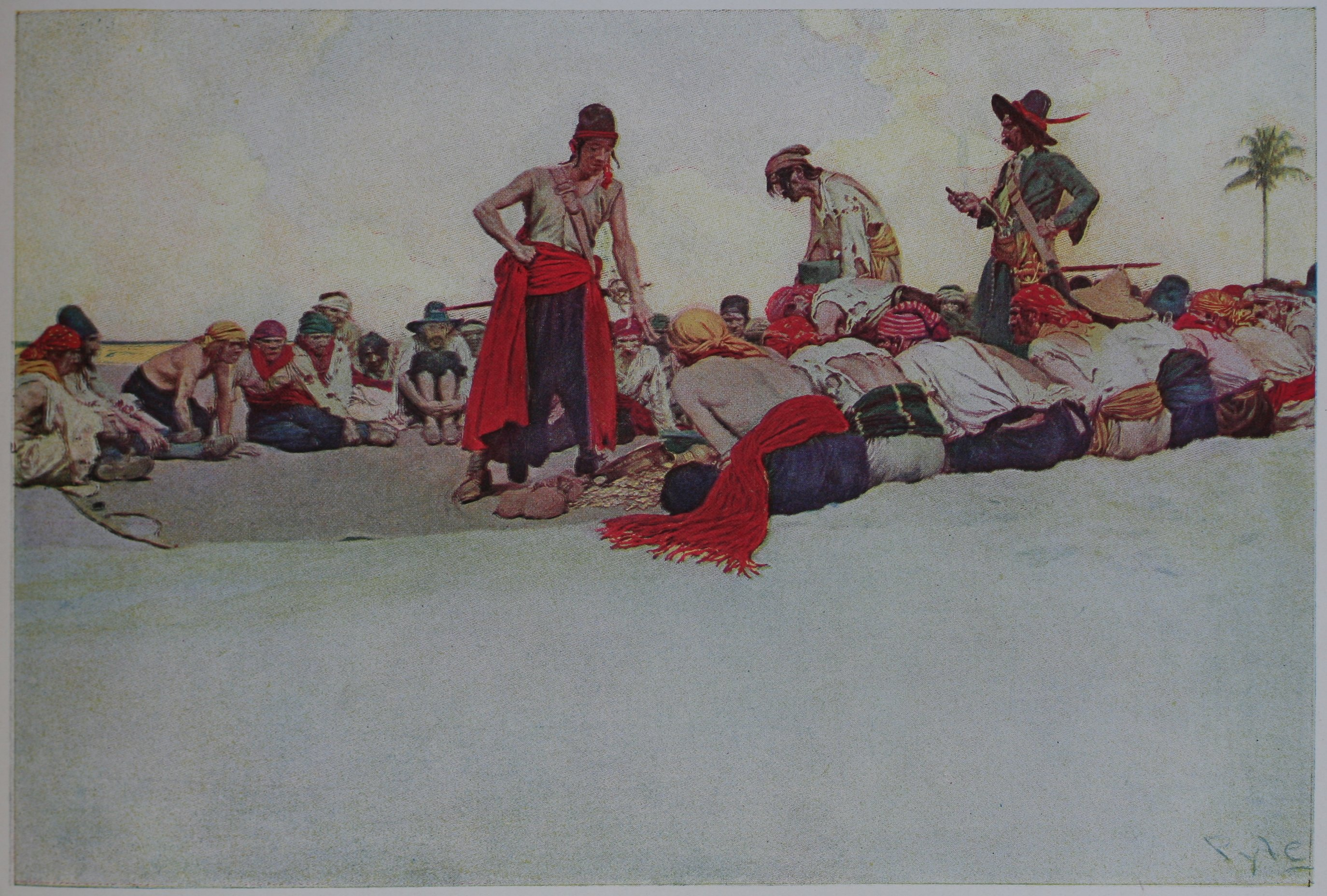
So the Treasure was Divided: pirates dividing their loot. The oil painting, which the illustration was of, was sold in 1905, and is currently part of the Delaware Art Museum's collection.[1]

The individuals that made up this "below-deck" society consisted of sailors, slaves, and other considered outcasts of society. The term "motley" attempted to categorize this multi-racial population as the anarchic rebels. Linebaugh and Redikier, identified such individuals within the historical context of Marxism: "Thus falling within the statutory meaning of 'sturdy rogue and beggar' were all those outside of organized wage labor, as well as those whose activities comprised the culture, tradition, and autonomous self-understanding of this volatile, questioning, and unsteady proletariat. Marx and Engels called the expropriated a motley crowd."

The marginalized population protested against low wages, mistreatment, poor ship quality, and oppression. English authorities regarded the rebels as outcasts of all nations: convicts, escaped slaves, debtors, indentured servants, prostitutes, and others on the margins of society.

Men were often assigned to ships, by force, as punishment for petty crimes as well as unpaid debts, they became subject to spending most of their lives on the water in the labors of desperate indentured servitude.

The exhibition of a version of a centralized authoritarian master was found in the ship's master, these would normally be the merchant captains of commerce who considered themselves as the authoritarian figure or absolute master, in which they considered their ability to enact harsh punishments of flogging and even execution as they wished or deemed necessary to display their power over their maritime society.

This space was a product of a maritime radical tradition “that also made it a zone of freedom.” The space 'below-deck” consisted of a gathering of multiple individuals from a variety of backgrounds, criminal status, and such that other upper-class individuals like Braithwaite might have condescended as savage-like and of low intelligence.

They are described to discover a haven in the lower decks of the ships where the motley-crew would gather and trade their own stories, perhaps a variation of Mary Louise Pratt's coined term, "contact-zone" the blending of culture, language, and mannerisms are said to have developed in this space of the ship. A culture and language unique to the multi-ethnic and multi-racial individuals united through the same marginalized positions during the seventeenth century: "As the strong hands of Braithwaite’s sailors made the Atlantic a zone for the accumulation of capital, they began to join with others in faithfulness, or solidarity, producing a maritime radical tradition that also made it a zone of freedom."

The motley crew developed its own language within its diverse and ever-expanding population, "It spoke its own speech, with a distinctive pronunciation, lexicon, and grammar made up of slang, cant, jargon, and pidgin—talk from work, the street, the prison, the gang, and the dock."

Richard Braithwaite uses the term when describing his late son who died at the hands of Algerian Pirates during the seventeenth century:

He was never acquainted with much civility; the sea hath taught him other rhetoric. . . . He cannot speak low, the sea talks so loud. His advice is seldom taken in naval affairs; though his hand is strong, his headpeace is stupid. . . . Stars cannot bemore faithful in their society than these Hans-kins in their fraternity. They will have it valiantly when they are ranked together, and relate their adventures with wonderful terror. Necessary instruments are they, and agents of main importance in that Hydrarchy wherein they live; for the walls of the State could not subsist without them; but least useful they are to themselves, and most needful for others supportance.

Marcus Rediker defines the community of diversity as "the multi-ethnic freebooters" which by "1716-1726 numbered around four thousand over the decade. They wreaked havoc in the Atlantic system" as the acts of trade disruption affected "various strategic zones of capital accumulation--the West Indies, North America, and West Africa."

=== Black Atlantic history ===
Modern literary scholars have also raised the issue of the necessary inclusion of the development of black culture among the forces of cultural nationalism concerning the history of the Atlantic world. The modernity of trade also contributed to the shaping of the Black Atlantic world during the same identified transformation period of the industrial revolution. It has been estimated that approximately twelve million Africans crossed the Atlantic Ocean between the sixteenth and nineteenth centuries.

== Converting to piracy ==
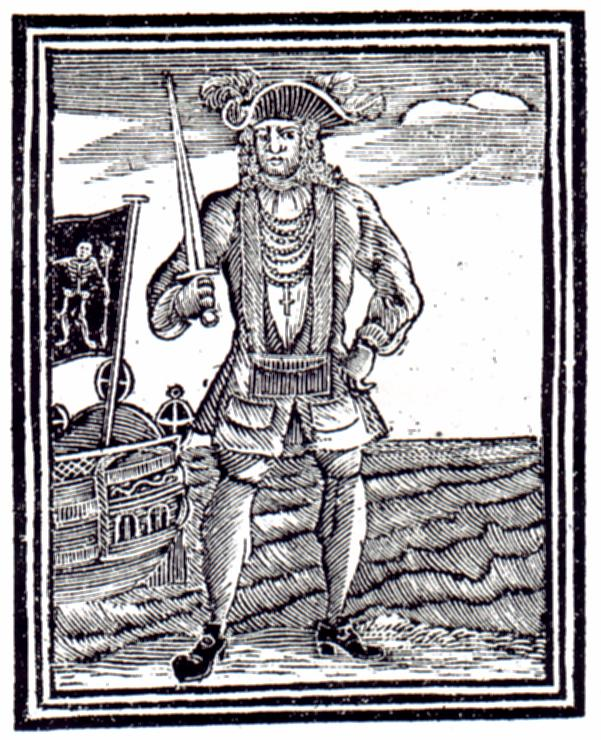
Bartholomew Roberts (Holzschnitt) 1725

Many sailors who entered into hydrarchy, led by commercial and military power by sea, contributed to the development of the pirate code, or the development of pirate society. Linebaugh and Rediker noted that by the 18th century, many slave ships were captured and converted to pirate duties.

The rise of piracy was not a new beginning however, the beginning of piracy can possibly be traced back to the Classical era—the history surrounding the Mediterranean Sea and the Greco-Roman relations and interactions. During this period, the term pirate was often imposed upon "a group by their political enemies in order to de-legitimatize them and their activities (labelled ‘piracy’) in the eyes of third parties, and at the same time to present those who were applying the labels to them in a positive light." Therefore the perhaps "deliberate misrepresentation or distortion of the nature of those communities" may have transcended through time itself in its application upon individuals deemed as threats to the central powers throughout history.

Around approximately the fourteenth century BC, the Mediterranean and Aegean Seas exhibited the development of perhaps one of the first populations of seamen suffering from the effects of poverty and terrain unsuitable for agriculture cultivation. The "notorious Sea Peoples" were a population of individuals of humble means who resorted to piracy when fishing could not sustain the population.

By the end of the War of Spanish succession, "as working conditions in the merchant industry rapidly deteriorated, seamen turned to the black flag by the thousands." John Jessup detailed the "jovial life among the pirates" that was perceived and experienced as "better than working at the big slave-trading fort of Cape Coast castle."

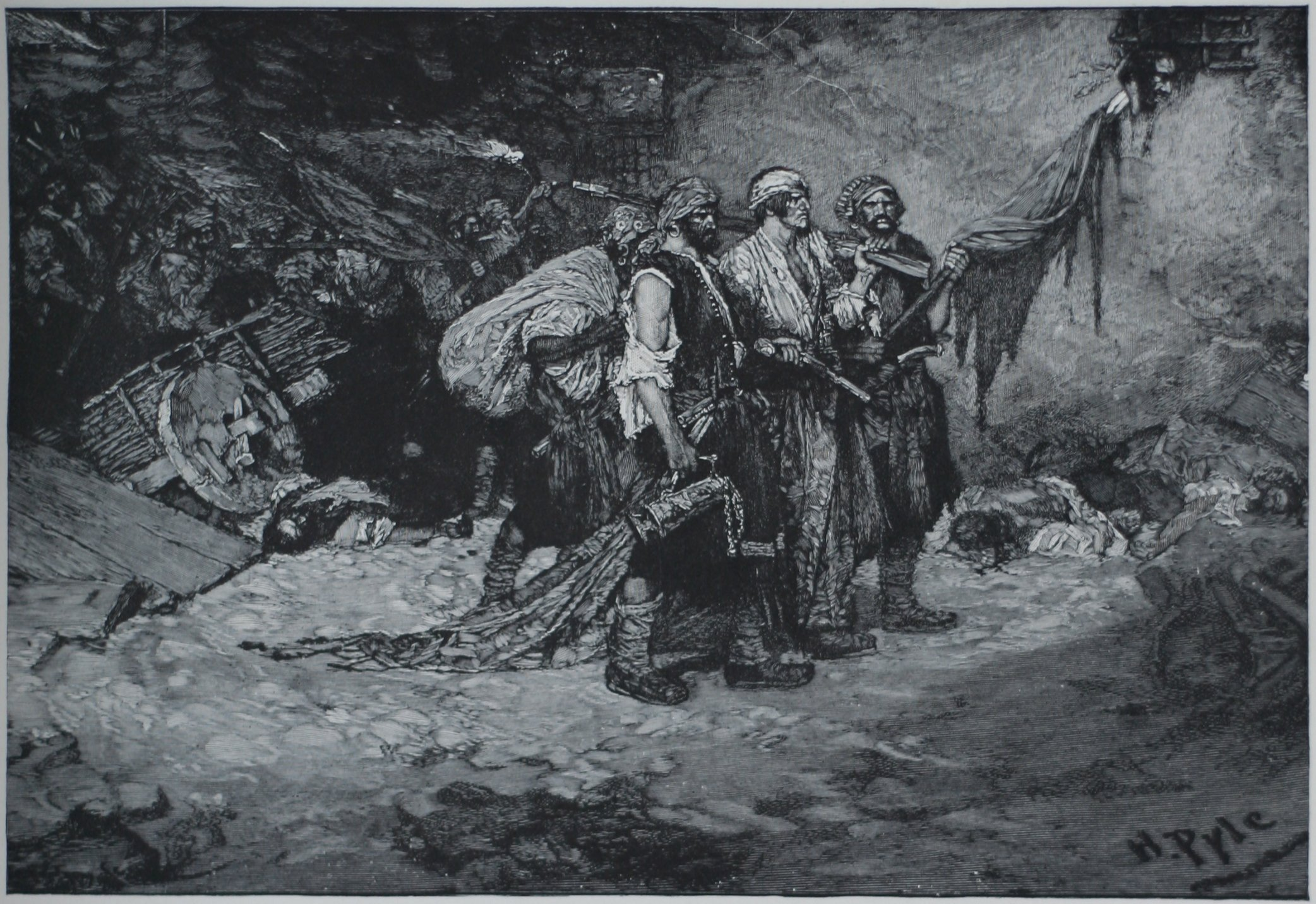
The Sacking of Panama: Originally published in 1887, "Buccaneers and Marooners of the Spanish Main". Harper's Magazine.

Many pirates made it a point to distinguish the functionality of their ships in stark contrast to the capital merchant counterparts as well as the Crown and Royal Navy. Two of the main facets being: one, their acquired loot from their acts of piracy were divided equally among the crew and two, the limited power of the ship captain. For the most part, pirate vessels were much more conscious about rigid class levels. Nevertheless, pirate vessels made it a common practice to place captured merchant captains at the mercy or justice of his crew; the crew of captured merchant ships were often offered a place within the pirate hydrarchy. Linebaugh and Rediker describe this established self-government uniquely:“the pirate ship was democratic in an undemocratic age…egalitarian in a hierarchical age." The changed and or flipped nature of the maritime society's power dynamics defined it as "the maritime world turned upside down."

Before attempts to exterminate society of pirates, there are some indications that the British empire sought to use pirates as a resource. England during the late sixteenth and early seventeenth centuries may have found a useful nature to piracy as an added offensive player to attack its longstanding powerful rival, the Spanish empire. According to Taylor, Queen Elizabeth I and proceeding colonial governors "protected and invested in pirate enterprises" temporarily; because of their need for larger coverage of "naval protection than the official navy could provide." This gave to rise to the development of privateers, individuals who were "licensed to plunder the enemy in wartime."

The suppression, extermination, and execution of the pirates occurred following the empire's no longer use of the privateers. The newly founded cooperation between the imperial authorities and the capitalist authorities such as merchants and governors presented an alliance or "peace [which] brought a partial demobilization of the navy and privateers, which unleashed thousands of mariners into a glutted labor market." The displacement resulted in large populations of unemployment that was widespread allowing merchant captains to exploit maritime laborers through cheap wages for increased intensive manual labor. Thus gave rise to the more violent and perhaps vengeance-seeking pirate fleet which ultimately became exterminated by the British campaign in 1730 throughout Bahamas, the Carolinas, and the West Indies.

== Literature ==
Maritime fiction or nautical fiction recreates fantastical tales of pirates and the motley crew in nostalgia for heroic naval history creating romantic and mystical stories of life at sea. Other sailors and even pirates went on to compile their travel accounts and diary entries into published works.

Captain Edgar Wakeman, a river pilot, or maritime pilot turned pirate, detailed in his own diary log, about the established self-governing society as a young sailor boy aboard the Peruvian around the 1820s. In his published diary, The Log of an Ancient Mariner, Wakeman describes a hierarchical society composed of lowly sailors (below-deck) subject to the harsh nature of ship officers (above-deck). Wakeman's accounts detail the conversing sailors objection to brutality they endured on deck: "Boy, this ship's cursed by honest sailor men from Maine to Yokohama. She's hell afloat, she is, and most of the hands 'ud rather die than go the voyage with the bloody officers we got."

However, Wakeman also took note of the equal brutality on all crew members, "We soon found that he was as severe upon the officers as upon the crew." Wakeman became aware of the established balance in power dynamics concerning the Captain and all individuals of his crew regardless of race and or position on deck:

"As the Peruvian butted her leaky way down the east coasts of North and South America, bound for Cape Horn, the crew found only one pleasant aspect to Captain Bidler's character. He was as hard upon the officers as upon the seamen. For men who had been beaten and kicked about the decks by the mates, it was pleasant, when the captain appeared on the scene, to watch him work the mates over with equal brutality."

The fantastical nature of the piracy and the pirate band permeated children's literature as well. American author and poet Bret Harte wrote The Queen of the Pirate Isle in 1886 about children's role-play imitating the behavior of a pirate band. The fantastical quality complimented the age of the protagonists as they engage in dreamlike fantastical imaginary adventures as a reduced, younger, and perhaps innocent portrayal of the motley crew, as their pirate band is also of mixed ethnicity, including the racist portrayal of a young Chinese page. The independent and liberation notion desired by the children is used to portray the zone of freedom, "possibly there was a fascination in the fact that their parents had forbidden them to go...it was also felt to be the first real step towards independence...there was a manifest need of some well define piratical purpose...they gazed at each other."

== Hydrarchy in the Viking Age ==
Based on Linebaugh and Rediker's conceptualisation of early modern hydrarchy, notable similarities have been observed in the organisational structure of ambulant Viking groups during the early medieval period. Neil Price first proposed a similarly adaptive organisation among Viking ships and fleets, characterising them as political spaces in their own right, whose participants were able to pursue their own self-interests outside established networks of maritime oversight. Considering the contemporary evidence from the Frankish realm, Christian Cooijmans likewise characterised such groups as multi-ethnic maritime communities, operating as "self-contained, self-centred politico-military entities ruled by independent, identifiable elites."

== See also ==
- Pirate code
- Distribution of justice
- Piracy
