= Jacobus Groenendaal =

South African statesman of Dutch origin

Member of the Volksraad of the Orange Free State
- In office 1853 – 23 February 1854
- In office 1858 – 27 November 1860

Government Secretary of the Orange Free State
- In office 23 February 1854 – January 1856
- Preceded by: New office
- Succeeded by: J.W. Spruyt

Treasurer General of the Orange Free State
- In office 23 February 1854 – August 1855
- Preceded by: New office

Acting State President of the Orange Free State
- In office Early April – 18 April 1854
- Preceded by: J.P. Hoffman
- Succeeded by: J.P. Hoffman

Personal details
- Born: 1 November 1805; Heerewaarden, Netherlands
- Died: 27 November 1860 (aged 55); Fauresmith, Orange Free State
- Spouse: Johanna Antoinet Helderman
- Occupation: Schoolteacher

Jacobus Groenendaal (1 November 1805 – 27 November 1860) was a South African statesman of Dutch origin, member of the Volksraad of the Orange Free State and the republic's first Treasurer General and Government Secretary in office from 1854 to 1855 and 1856 respectively.

Groenendaal was born in Heerewaarden, Netherlands, and was one of the many Dutch immigrants who settled in South Africa around the middle of the nineteenth century. He was a schoolteacher by training, but quickly became an influential politician, first in the negotiations about the formation of the Orange Free State, and afterwards as a parliamentarian and office holder. His political career was hampered by bad health and differences of opinion with State President Boshoff, and eventually cut short by his early death.

Groenendaal left an important political legacy in the form of the Orange free State constitution, in the draft of which he played an important role.

== Early life and migration ==
Groenendaal was born in Heerewaarden, the Netherlands, son of a farmer in that village. He was trained as a schoolteacher, and worked in a primary school in the Dutch town of Amersfoort in the late 1840s. Several articles written in 1848 and 1849 by professor U.G. Lauts about Dutch relations with South Africa, and the need for Dutch assistance in the field of education and public administration, inspired Groenendaal to get in touch with Lauts. On his recommendation Groenendaal emigrated to South Africa in 1849, already forty-four years old, but still single. From Cape Town, where he arrived with several other Dutch migrants, Groenendaal travelled to the Orange River Sovereignty, where he established himself in February 1850 as government teacher in Rietrivier in Sannah's Poort (now Fauresmith).

In the years after, Groenendaal strongly propagated Dutch migration to South Africa, bringing migrants to the Orange River Sovereignty privately. In this enterprise he co-operated with Lauts, and they continued their 'business' after the independence of the Orange Free State. When circumstances for migration deteriorated, both Groenendaal and Lauts were criticised for their actions.

== Political career ==
The inhabitants of Sannah's Poort appointed Groenendaal as their representative to the conference in Bloemfontein of 5 September 1853, where a possible political independence of the Orange River Sovereignty was first discussed. During the negotiations, the delegates appointed him a member of the Council of Representatives, charged with the negotiations about the final take-over of sovereignty, which resulted in the Orange River Convention.

As a member of the Volksraad Groenendaal and his fellow member J.M. Orpen, an Irishman, were the dominant forces behind the drafting of a constitution. After the formation of the Orange Free State Groenendaal was appointed its first State Secretary, a title soon changed to Government Secretary. He was also appointed the state's Treasurer General. In April 1854 he briefly acted as State President for J.P. Hoffman.

Groenendaal and State President Hoffman did get along well together, and they briefly established a solid political and administrative basis for the new state. Both Groenendaal and Hoffman were cripples, reason for their government to quickly gain the nickname 'the crippled government', but this did not reflect the true affairs of the state.

After State President Hoffman was forced to retire because of the 'gunpowder incident', Groenendaal remained in office. However, his relationship with the new State President, Boshoff, was much less cordial than that with Hoffman. One reason was the chaotic state of affairs at the Treasury, for which Groenendaal was responsible, and which Boshoff quickly criticised.

Plagued by poor health (first fevers, later a serious disease of his leg) forced Groenendaal to go on leave for several months in 1855-1856. State President Boshoff took the opportunity to request the Volksraad to dismiss him as Treasurer General. In January 1856 Groenendaal was forced to resign as Government Secretary. The resignation was followed by a period in which Groenendaal kept away from active politics, although he did get involved in political debate through letters in the local press. In these he strongly criticised Boshoff's policies with regard to land speculation. Groenendaal, though not a very powerful figure, still had allies in the Volksraad, which appointed him member of a commission to oversee the state budget for 1858, much to the dismay of President Boshoff.

In November 1858, Groenendaal was re-elected to the Volksraad for the constituency of Midden-Rietrivier en Grootrivier in Sannah's Poort Fauresmith. This time, he found himself on the side of Boshoff, and up against a majority of the Volksraad, in the debate about unification of the Orange Free State with the South African Republic. Groenendaal, Boshoff, and State Attorney H.A.L. Hamelberg were all for a federation with the Cape Colony instead.

Groenendaal was much occupied with the foundation of the state, both in its basic structure, its state apparatus, and its paraphernalia, like a coat of arms and a flag. At the same time he strongly pressed for international recognition, especially from the Netherlands. A state press was to curb the influence of the British printing press and newspapers in the Orange Free State. In a sense, Groenendaal was a progenitor of Afrikaner (Free State) nationalism. He remained an active member of the Volksraad until his death.

Groenendaal married late in life, in 1858, with Johanna Antoinet Helderman, widow of P.W. van der Merwe. He died in his house in Fauresmith, Orange Free State, on 27 November 1860, only fifty-five years old.

== Bibliography ==
- [Groenendaal, J.], 'Die reisbeskrywing van Jacobus Groenendaal: 'n blik op die Suid-Afrikaanse samelewing deur én Nederlandse landverhuiser in 1850', Historische Studies, Julie 1941.
