= Bartolomeu Português =

17th-century Portuguese pirate

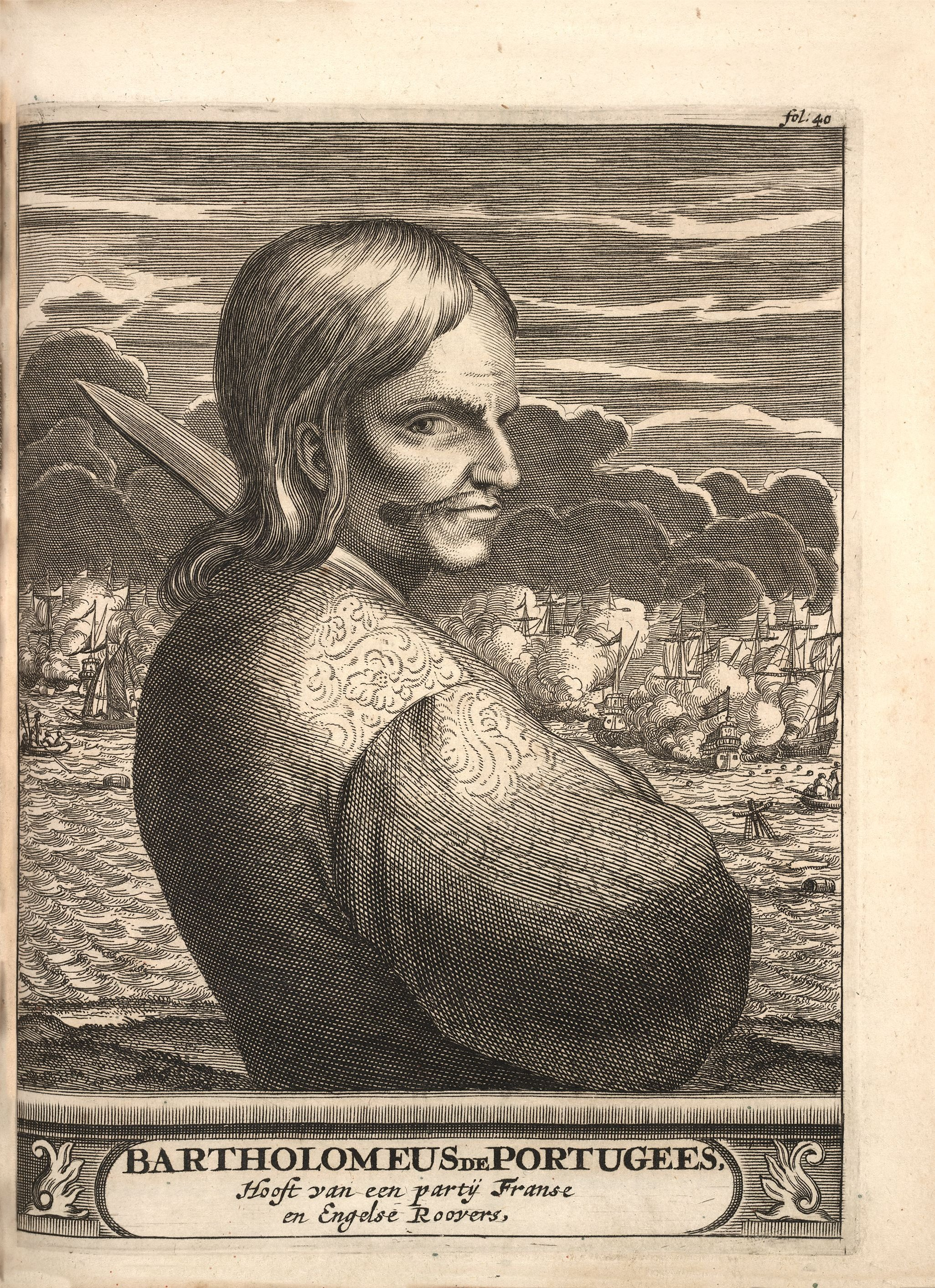
- Born: 1623
- Died: 1670 (aged 46–47)
- Piratical career
- Type: Buccaneer
- Allegiance: Portugal
- Years active: 1666–1669
- Rank: Captain
- Base of operations: Campeche

Bartolomeu Português (1623–1670) was a Portuguese buccaneer who attacked Spanish shipping in the late 1660s. Português was claimed responsible for the creation of the first "Pirate's Code".

== Piratical career ==
Arriving in the Caribbean sometime in the early 1660s, as did many others during the decade, Português operated off Campeche from 1666 to 1669. He later captured a larger Spanish ship with his ship of four guns and a crew of thirty, off Cuba, after two assaults with over half his crew killed or wounded. With a total of 70,000 pieces of eight and a cargo of 120,000 pounds of cacao beans, Português attempted to sail towards Jamaica; however, due to strong winds, they were unable to return to Port Royal - instead sailing for western Cuba.

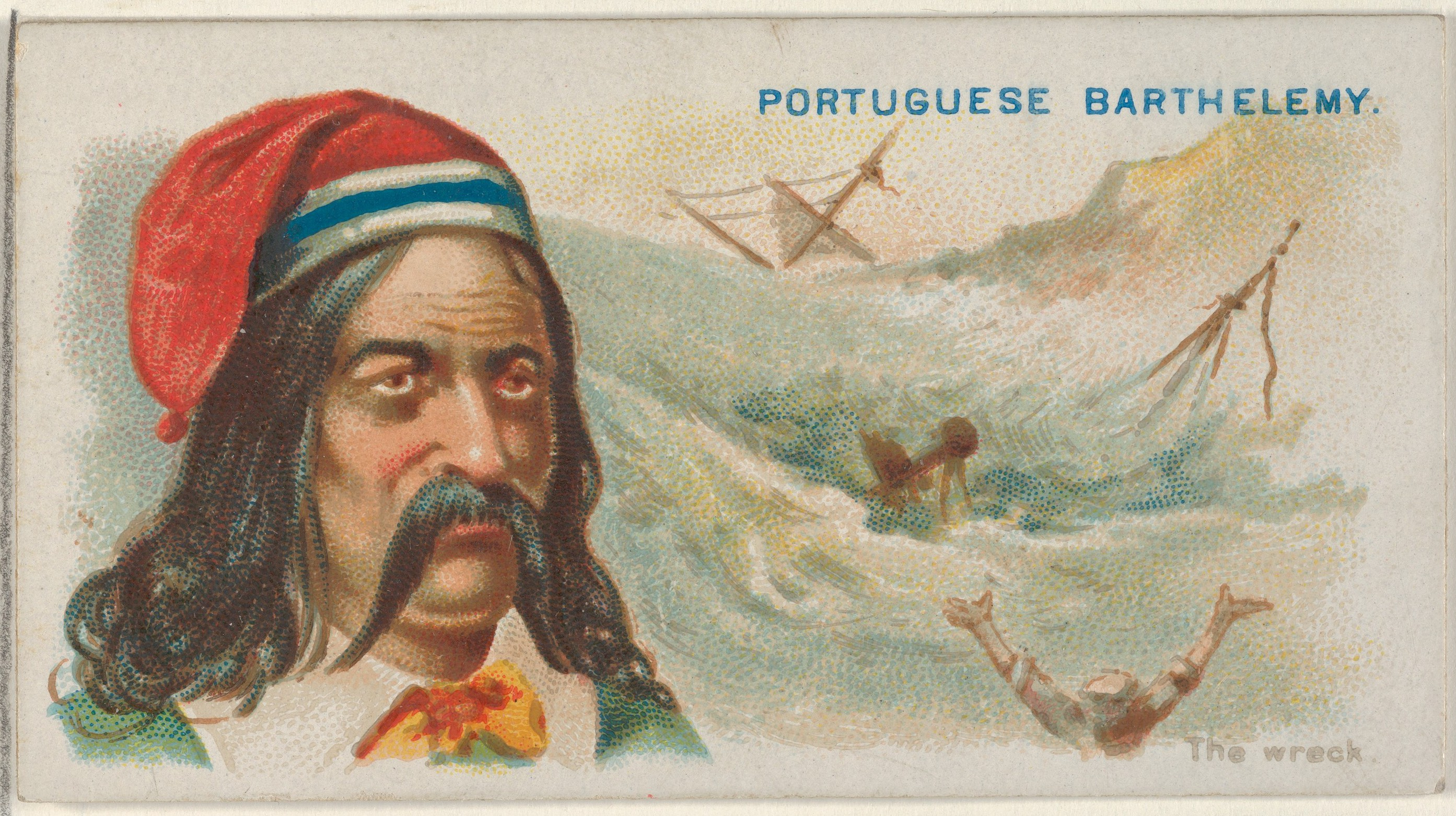
Portuguese Barthelemy, The Wreck, from the Pirates of the Spanish Main series (N19) for Allen & Ginter Cigarettes MET DP835035

As the ship reached Cape San Antonio, they were captured by three Spanish warships who seized their cargo. After a violent storm, Português was forced to sail towards Campeche where he was later recognized and captured by authorities. Held prisoner on a Spanish ship, he attempted to escape by stabbing the sentry with a stolen knife, and because he supposedly could not swim, he used wine jars as floaters to swim to shore.

Traveling through over 120 miles of jungle, Português arrived at El Golfo Triste in eastern Yucatan and found a ship to take him back to Port Royal. Returning to Campeche with 20 men, Português captured the ship in which he had been held prisoner and sailed off with the same amount of cargo. The ship soon ran aground near Isle of Pines off the southern coast of Cuba, losing the entire cargo. With his remaining crew, Português returned to Port Royal before setting out once again. However, nothing more is recorded of Português after this, as Alexander Exquemelin wrote in Buccaneers of America, he “made many violent attacks on the Spaniards without gaining much profit from marauding, for I saw him dying in the greatest wretchedness in the world.”
