= Laws of Wisbuy =

Maritime law code

- Created: 1400s
- Purpose: Maritime law

The Laws of Wisbuy, also known as the Wisbuy Sea Law or Gotland Sea Law, was a compilation of medieval maritime laws created in the 1400s. These laws themselves originated from the thirteenth and fourteenth centuries. The Wisbuy Sea Law did not originate in Wisbuy (but obtained its name, it has been assumed, because the exemplar of the first printed edition (the first to mention Wisbuy and Gotland) was kept in Wisbuy (now Visby, capital of the island of Gotland).

== Contents ==
The text includes common laws which were meant to apply for European countries involved with trade overseas. The rules included solutions to likely dilemmas such as jettison, shipwreck and ship collision. The laws were to some extent used in the later medieval period but were partly out of date by that time.

== Usage ==
Predecessors of the Wisbuy Sea Law combined two laws: the Flemish/Dutch translation of the Rôles d’Oléron, known as Vonnesse Damme, from about 1286, and Ordinancie from the second half of the fourteenth century. This text was referred to as the ‘Waterrecht’ (water law) and was spread to different northern European towns. Subsequently, a number of articles originating in Lübeck were added in some Danish manuscripts in the fifteenth century. The first printed edition of this text was made in Copenhagen by Godfried von Gemen in 1505. Gemen referred to the text in his edition as the highest sea law. A second edition emerged in 1532 (in Amsterdam) and a third one in 1537 (in Lübeck). This latter edition included seven Articles from the Lübeck Town Law of 1294, eight articles from Ordnung für Schiffer und Schiffsleute from Lübeck and one article from an unknown source.
