= Jan Willem =

Jan Willem may refer to

== People ==
- Jan Willem Beyen (1897–1976), Dutch diplomat
- Jan Willem Boudewijn Gunning (1860–1913), Dutch doctor
- Jan-Willem Breure (born 1988), Dutch media producer and artist
- Jan Willem de Jong (1921–2000), Dutch indologist
- Jan Willem de Pous (1920–1996), Dutch politician
- Jan Willem de Winter (1761–1812), Dutch Admiral
- Jan-Willem Gabriëls (born 1979), Dutch Olympic rower
- Jan Willem Hunter Morkel (1890–1916), South African rugby union player
- Jan Willem Janssens (1762–1838), Dutch nobleman
- Jan Willem Pieneman (1779–1853), Dutch artist
- Jan Willem Spruyt (1826–1908), South African statesman
- Jan Willem Storm van Leeuwen, Dutch chemist
- Jan Willem te Kolsté (1874–1936), Dutch chess master
- Jan Willem van Ede (born 1963), Dutch footballer

== Ships ==
- SS Jan Willem, Dutch cargo ship in service 1950–51

== See also ==
- Jan Willems (died 1688), Dutch pirate
