= No purchase, no pay =

Phrase used by pirates and privateers

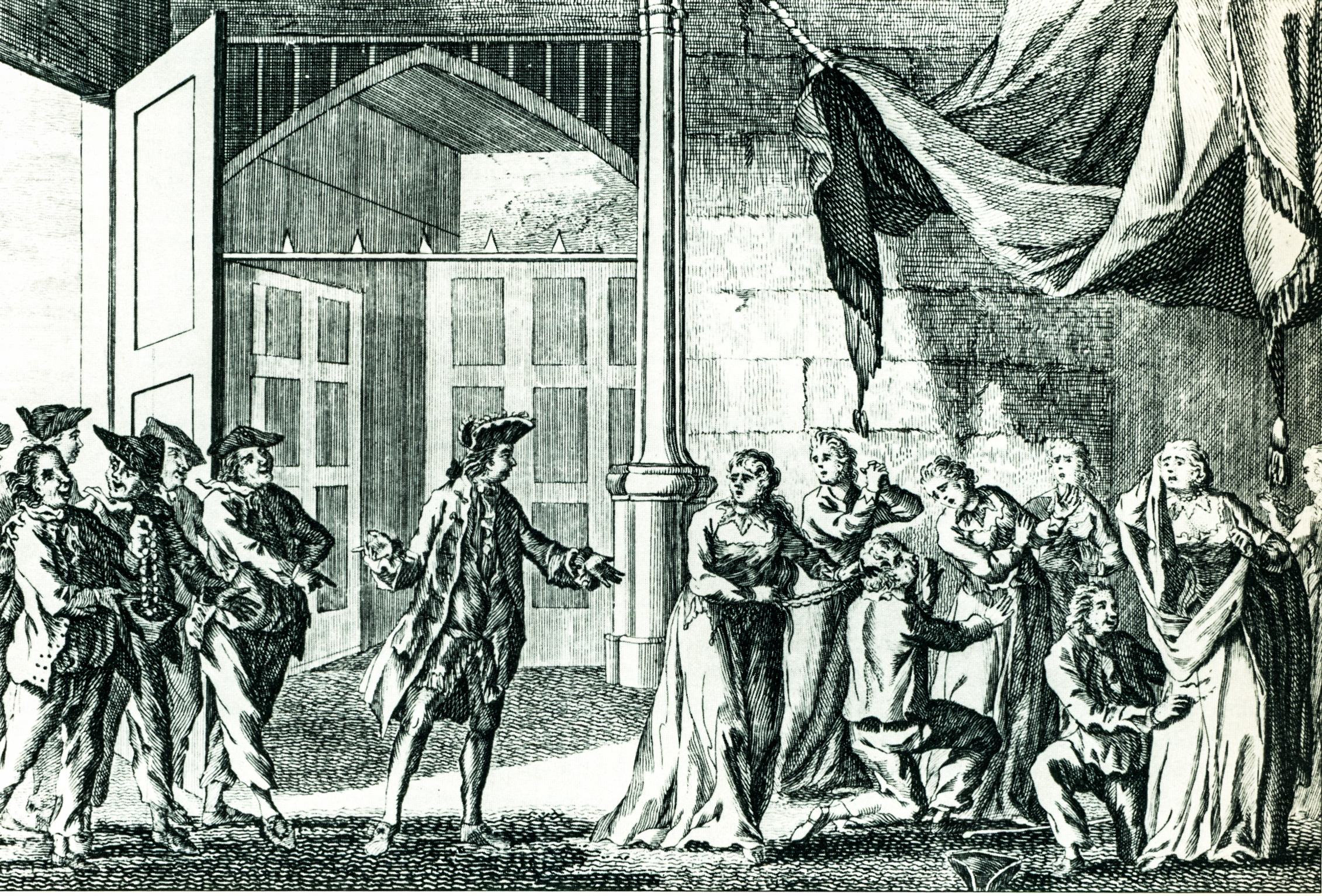
Privateer captain Woodes Rogers who is said to have employed pirates on a "no purchase, no pay" basis.

"No purchase, no pay" (or "no prey, no pay") was a phrase used by pirates and privateers, of the 17th century in particular, to describe the conditions under which participants were expected to join expeditions or raids. The phrase describes a remuneration arrangement similar to a commission.

== Meaning ==
The term "purchase" in the phrase is used to mean success against piratical targets from whom booty might be successfully extracted. The premise of the phrase was that if the expedition did not succeed in extracting booty from the target, those participating in the expedition would receive no reward.

In the case of an unsuccessful raid, participants might receive nothing at all. But if a raid was successful, then loot was often shared equitably and democratically with clear ratios based on seniority and length of service.

== Use ==
The phrase was used extensively to describe arrangements for pirates working on the Spanish Main in particular. The concept is said to have encouraged increased risk-taking as pirates made a calculated decision to attack more valuable targets with a better risk-reward ratio.

Hender Molesworth, Governor of Jamaica, is known to have issued privateer and even pirate-hunting contracts with strict "no purchase, no pay" clauses.

== See also ==
- Buccaneer
- Letter of marque
- No win, no fee
- Pirate code
