= Jean Charpin =

French pirate and buccaneer (fl. 1688–1689)

Jean Charpin (fl. 1688–1689) was a French pirate and buccaneer active in the Caribbean and off the coast of Africa. He is best known for sailing alongside Jean-Baptiste du Casse as well as for his Articles, or “Pirate Code.”

== History ==
Dutch pirate Laurens de Graaf in 1687 captured a 14-gun Spanish frigate near Cartagena which he renamed Sainte Rose. He sailed to Petit-Goave where the officials confirmed the capture – de Graaf claimed the Spaniard had attacked him first - and granted de Graaf possession of the ship. The Governor of Port-de-Paix asked him to retire to Ile a Vache to serve as Major. He agreed and arranged for his crew to disperse. The Governor suspected trouble and sailed to Ile a Vache to investigate, finding less than half of de Graaf's crew still present and the Sainte Rose missing. de Graaf explained that he'd set the ship to sea to rescue an English vessel which had foundered nearby, and to intercept a privateer spotted in the area.

In truth de Graaf had given the Sainte Rose to a friend and former crewmate, Jean Charpin. By the time the Governor left satisfied with de Graaf's explanation, Charpin had drawn up Articles to govern the crew's piracy and had all aboard sign them. His Pirate Code is one of the few surviving sets and one of the only ones complete. Translated from the French, they read:

Copie de la charte-partie faite entre M. Charpin, commandant la Sainte-Rose, et son équipage qui sont convenus entre eux de lui donner dix lots pour lui, que pour son commandement et pour son navire.

Tous les bâtiments pris en mer ou à l'ancre portant huniers qui ne se donneront point voyage; les bâtiments seront brûlés et les agrès seront pour le bâtiment de guerre.

Item. Tous les bâtiments pris, le capitaine aura le choix; et le non-choix demeurera à l'équipage sans que le capitaine y puisse rien prétendre.
Item. Le capitaine se réserve ses chaudières et son canot de guerre; et les chaudières qui seront prises seront pour l'équipage.
Item. Tous bâtiments pris hors de la portée du canon avec les canots de guerre seront pillage. Tous ballots entamés entre deux ponts ou au fond de cale, pillage.
Item. Or, argent, perle, diamant, musc, ambre, civette et toutes sortes de pierreries, pillage.
Item. Celui qui aura la vue des bâtiments aura 100 pièces de 8 si la prise est de valeur ou double pillage.
Item. Tout homme estropié au service du bâtiment aura 600 pièces de 8 ou 6 nègres a choix s'il s'en prend.
Item. Tout homme convaincu de lâcheté perdra son voyage.
Item. Tout homme faisant faux serment et convaincu de vol perdra son voyage et sera dégradé sur la première caye.
Item. Tout canot de guerre qui sortira en course qui prendra au-dessus de 500 pièces sera pour l'équipage dudit canot.
Item. Tous nègres et autres esclaves qui seront pris par le canot reviendront au pied du mât.
Item. Pour les Espagnols qui ne seront point guéris, étant arrivé en lieu, l'équipage s'oblige de donner une pièce de 8 pour lesdits malades pour le chirurgien par jour l'espace de 3 mois étant arrivé à terre.
Item. M. de La Borderie et M. Jocom se sont obligés de servir l'équipage de tout ce qui leur sera nécessaire pendant le voyage; et l'équipage s'oblige de leur donner 180 pièces de 8 pour leur coffre; et ceux des chirurgiens qui seront pris avec les instruments qui ne seront point garnis d'argent seront pour le chirurgien.

Ladite charte ne pourra se casser ni annuler que nous n'ayons fait voyage tous ensemble.
Fait à l'île à Vache, ancré et affourché le 18 de février 1688.

Ainsi signé : Jean Charpin et Mathurin Desmarestz, quartier-maître de l'équipage.

Translation:

Copy of charter party made between M. Charpin, commanding the Sainte-Rose, and his crew, who agreed to give him ten lots for himself, and for his command and his ship.

All the vessels taken at sea or at anchor bearing topsails, which shall not travel; The ships will be burnt and the rigs will be for the warship.

Item. All the ships captured, the captain will have the choice; Otherwise the decision will remain with the crew without the captain being able to claim anything.
Item. The captain reserves his boilers and his canoe of war; And the boilers that will be taken will be for the crew.
Item. All ships taken out of the reach of the cannon with the war canoes will be looted. All bales opened between two bridges or at the bottom of the hold, looting.
Item. Gold, silver, pearl, diamond, musk, amber, civet and all kinds of jewels, looting.
Item. The one who will have the sight of the ships will have 100 pieces of 8 if the hold is worth, or double plunder.
Item. Any crippled man in the service of the ship will have 600 pieces of 8 or 6 negroes to choose if he takes it.
Item. Every man convicted of cowardice will lose his share.
Item. Any man making false oath and convicted of theft will lose his share and will be marooned on the first caye.
Item. Any canoe of war that will come out in the attack that will take above 500 pieces, will be for the crew of the canoe.
Item. All Negroes and other slaves who will be taken by the canoe will return to the foot of the mast.
Item. For the Spaniards, who are not cured, having arrived at the place, the crew is obliged to give a piece of eight for the said patients for the surgeon per day, the space of three months having arrived on land.
Item. M. de la Borderie and M. Jocom have been obliged to serve the crew with all that is necessary to them during the journey; And the crew is obliged to give them 180 pieces of 8 for their chest; And those of the surgeons who will be taken with the instruments which will not be furnished with money will be for the surgeon.

The said charter will not be able to break or annul that we have not been traveling together.
Done at Cow Island (Isle la Vache), anchored and founded on the 18th of February, 1688.

Thus signed: Jean Charpin and Mathurin Desmarestz, quartermaster of the crew.

In early 1688 Charpin collected additional crew before setting out. At the island of Roatan he took on board Jean Fantin and some sailors from Dutch buccaneer Jan Willem’s former crew. He also embarked William Kidd and Robert Culliford, whom he picked up at Ile a Vache, two of only 6 Englishmen among over 70 French sailors. Under a privateering commission they captured a Dutch ship in early 1689, which they renamed Dauphin and carried back to New England where they sold their plundered cargo and refitted for a longer voyage. While there, the crew took a vote and removed Charpin as commander, selecting Fantin in his place.

Charpin remained aboard the Sainte Rose as Fantin sailed to west Africa, joining forces with Jean-Baptiste du Casse at Cape Verde and then returning to the Caribbean. Charpin complained to du Casse about the loss of his ship, but his pleas were ignored. Fantin captured a rich Spanish ship at du Casse's request, then joined him ashore in unsuccessful attacks on Dutch colonies at Surinam and Berbice. Charpin argued about division of the loot from the Spanish ship, and his former crew abandoned him to sail aboard it with Fantin.

When England and France declared war later in 1689, du Casse assaulted the English settlement at St. Christopher. It was there that Kidd and Culliford conspired with the English crewmen to steal the unguarded Spanish prize ship from Fantin, sailing it to Nevis where they renamed it Blessed William. Fantin left with Charpin's remaining crew aboard a captured brigantine. Little more is known of Charpin; he may have departed with the soldiers du Casse dismissed after the attack on St. Christopher, whom he sent away on the Dauphin. The Sainte Rose itself ended up beached during one of du Casse's attacks. Charpin's quartermaster Desmarestz bought a small ship named La Machine and continued on to a piracy career of his own.

== See also ==
- King William's War, the conflict that reignited privateering between the English and French.
