= Pirate code =

Code of conduct for governing pirates

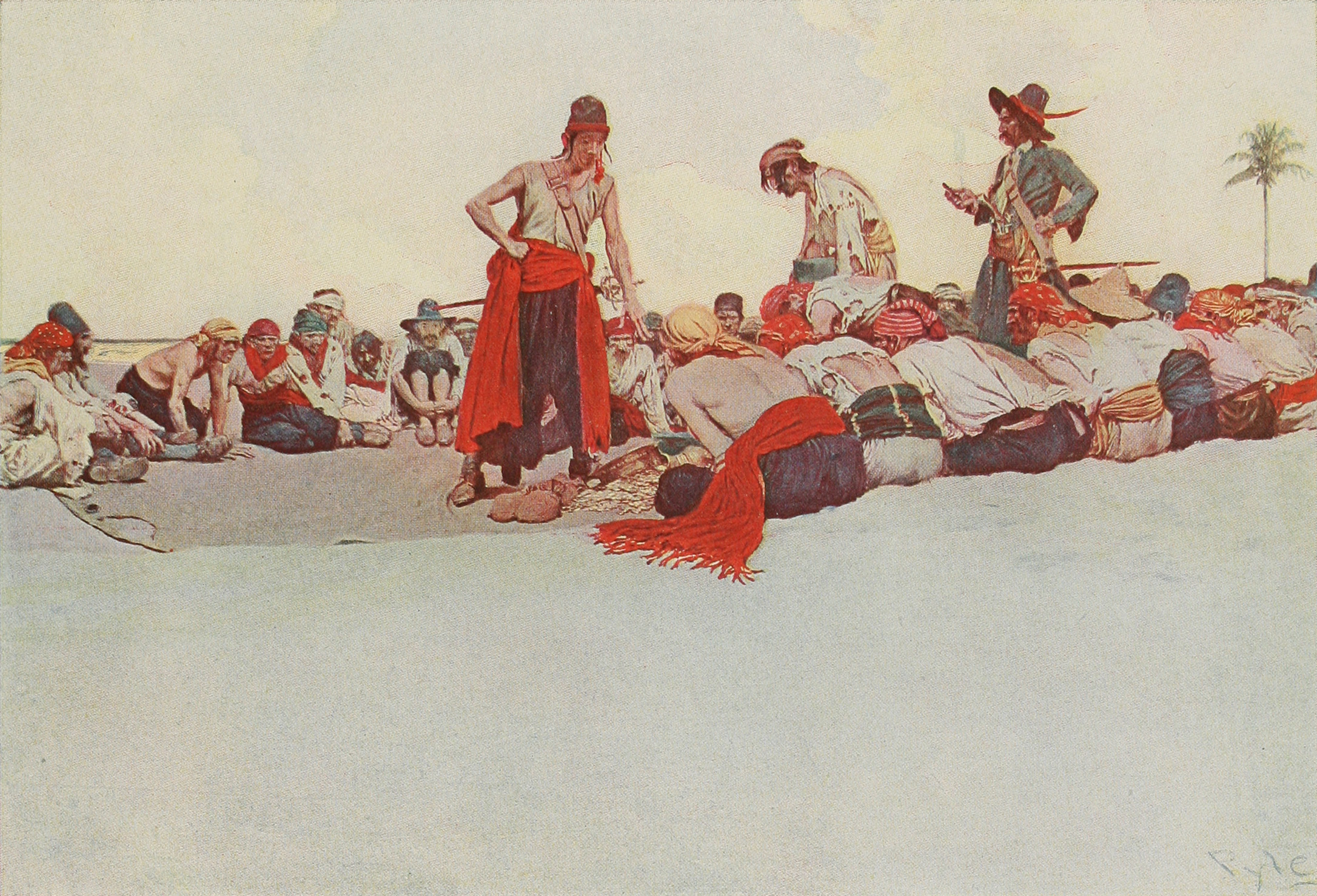
Treasure being divided among pirates in an illustration by Howard Pyle.

Pirate articles, or articles of agreement, (Note: The term "Pirate Code" was not used during this period and is a modern invention.) were a code of conduct for governing ships of pirates, notably between the 17th and 18th centuries, during the so-called "Golden Age of Piracy".

The typical pirate crew was an unorthodox mixture of former sailors, escaped convicts, disillusioned men, and possibly former or escaped slaves, among others, looking for wealth at any cost; once aboard a seafaring vessel, the group would draw-up their own ship- and crew-specific code (or articles), which listed and described the crew's policies governing pirate behaviour (such as drunkenness, fighting, and interaction with women) and the associated disciplinary action, should a code be violated.

Failing to honour the Articles could get a pirate marooned, whipped, beaten, or even executed (such as one article described, for merely allowing a woman aboard their ship). Primarily, these articles were designed to keep order aboard the ship, avoid dissension or mutinies, and ensure the crews' loyalty, all of which was crucial to the group's mutual survival.

== History ==
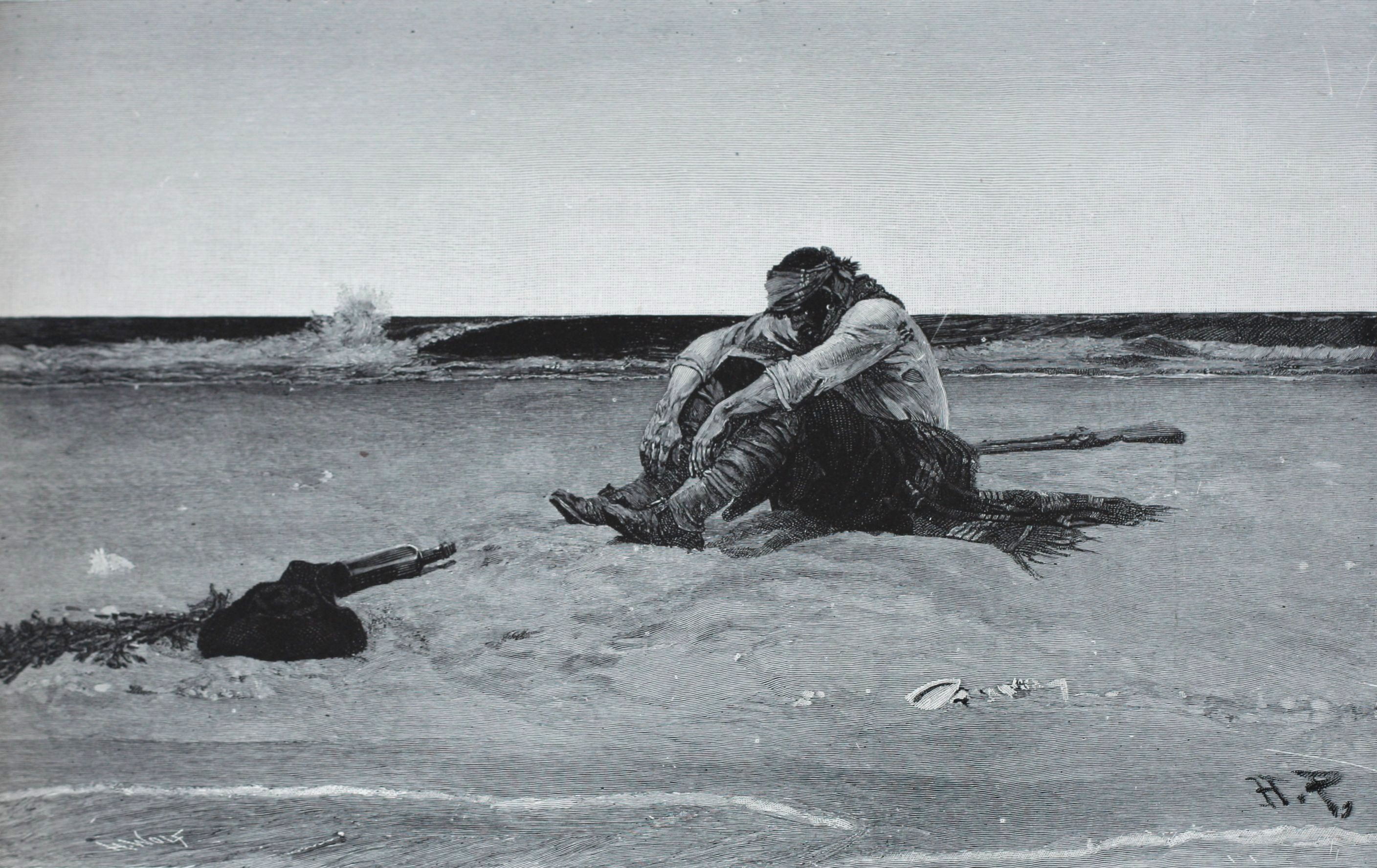
A painting depicting a marooned pirate by Howard Pyle.

While legend has it that the first set of the pirate codes were written by the Portuguese buccaneer Bartolomeu Português sometime in the early 1660s, the first formal recorded set belonged to George Cusack who was active from 1668 to 1675. These early buccaneer articles were based on earlier maritime law and privateer codes such as the 12th century Rolls of Oléron. They were later used by buccaneers and pirates such as John Phillips, Edward Low and Bartholomew Roberts. Buccaneers operated under a ship's articles that, among other things, governed conduct of the crew. These "articles of agreement" became authority independent of any nation, and were variously called the Chasse-Partie, Charterparty, Custom of the sea, or Jamaica Discipline. These retroactively became known (in the modern era) as the Pirate's Code as well. Pirate articles varied from one captain to another, and sometimes even from one voyage to another, but they were generally alike in including provisions for discipline, specifications for each crewmate's share of treasure, and compensation for the injured.

Each crew member was asked to sign or make his mark on the articles, then swear an oath of allegiance or honour. The oath was sometimes taken on a Bible, but John Phillips' men, lacking a Bible, swore on an axe. Legend suggests that other pirates swore on crossed pistols, swords, on a human skull, or astride a cannon. This act formally inducted the signer into the pirate crew, generally entitling him to vote for officers and on other "affairs of moment", to bear arms, and to his share of the plunder. The articles having been signed, they were then posted in a prominent place, often the door to the captain's cabin.

After a piratical cruise began, new recruits from captured ships would sometimes sign the articles, in some cases voluntarily, in other cases under threat of torture or death. Valuable sea artisans, such as carpenters, surgeons, blacksmiths or navigators, were especially likely to be forced to sign articles under duress, and would rarely be released regardless of their decision to sign or not. In some cases, even willing recruits would ask the pirates to pretend to force them to sign, so that they could plead they were forced should they ever be captured by the law. Generally, men who had not signed the articles had a much better chance of acquittal at trial if captured by the law.

Pirate articles are closely related to, and were derived from, ship's articles of the time, especially those of privateers, which similarly provided for discipline and regulated distribution of booty (though usually far less equally than with pirate articles). Merchant articles and privateering articles can be traced back to Europe in the Middle Ages when there was a system of "joint hands" agreements between merchants, owners, and seamen to share profits.

== Internal governance and economics ==
Although pirates of the Golden Age are popularly imagined as anarchic, scholarship has shown that pirate crews were typically organised under codified, democratic rules. Before a voyage, a crew would draft and collectively agree to written "articles of agreement", and every member was required to swear to them, in at least one recorded case "upon a Hatchet for want of a Bible". The articles were settled in advance to prevent disputes, and were drawn up alongside the election of a captain and quartermaster.

The articles of Bartholomew Roberts, preserved in A General History of the Pyrates (1724), are among the most detailed surviving examples. They opened by granting every man a vote in matters of importance and equal access to captured provisions, and set out how plunder was to be divided: the captain and quartermaster each received two shares, the master gunner and boatswain one and a half, other officers one and a quarter, and ordinary crewmen one share each. Marcus Rediker has described this arrangement as possibly one of the most egalitarian schemes for distributing resources anywhere in the early eighteenth century.

Executive authority was divided between the captain and the quartermaster. The captain commanded during battle but held limited power at other times, while the quartermaster—also elected by the crew—distributed plunder, settled disputes, and administered punishment for minor offences. A captain judged cowardly, abusive, or incompetent could be deposed by majority vote. Economist Peter T. Leeson has characterised this as a system of checks and balances that anticipated similar arrangements in European governments, and argued that such institutions made pirates one of the more sophisticated criminal organisations of their era.

The articles also provided compensation for crew members injured in service, a provision without equivalent in contemporary naval or merchant employment. Roberts' articles awarded 800 pieces of eight from the common fund to any man who lost a limb, with smaller amounts paid for lesser injuries. Leeson interpreted such clauses as a form of occupational insurance and a rational response to the dangers of the trade.

These conditions contrasted sharply with legitimate maritime employment, in which a captain held absolute authority, crews could not remove him, and wages were fixed regardless of a voyage's success. Historians have identified this contrast as a significant reason sailors chose piracy; Rediker emphasises its ideological character as a rejection of harsh shipboard hierarchies, while Leeson treats the same institutions in economic terms as efficient solutions to problems of trust and cooperation.

== Examples ==
Several 17th and 18th century pirates such as Bartholomew Roberts, John Philips, Edward Low and George Lowther were known to have written articles for piratical rules onboard ships. Lowe's articles were published in The Boston News-Letter on August 1, 1723, and also The Tryals of Thirty-Six Persons for Piracy, Twenty-Eight of them upon Full Evidence were Found Guilty and the Rest Acquitted, which was also printed in 1723. Nine complete or nearly complete sets of piratical articles have survived, chiefly from Charles Johnson's A General History of the Pyrates, first published in 1724, and from records kept by Admiralty Court proceedings at the trials of pirates. A partial code from Henry Morgan is preserved in Alexandre Exquemelin's 1678 book The Buccaneers of America. Many other pirates are known to have had articles; the late-17th century Articles of George Cusack and Nicholas Clough have also survived intact. Part of the reason that few pirate articles have survived is that pirates on the verge of capture or surrender often burned their articles or threw them overboard to prevent the papers being used against them at trial.

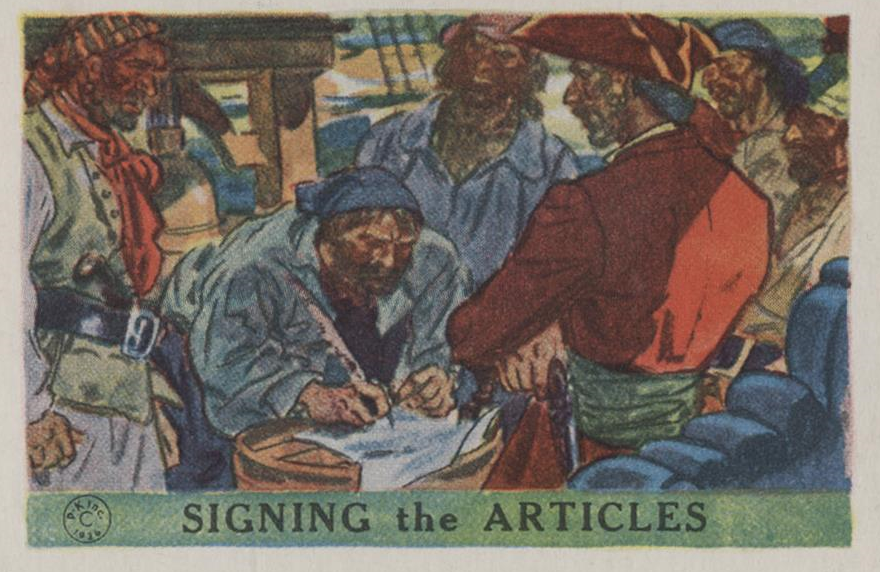
"Signing the Articles" from the 1936 Pac-Kups "Jolly Roger Pirates" trading card set

=== Articles of Bartholomew Roberts ===
Bartholomew Roberts' Articles were similar, but not identical, to those of his former captain, Howell Davis. In turn, Roberts' Articles influenced those of pirates such as Thomas Anstis who served under him and later went their own way.

I. Every man has a vote in affairs of moment; has equal title to the fresh provisions, or strong liquors, at any time seized, and may use them at pleasure, unless a scarcity (not an uncommon thing among them) makes it necessary, for the good of all, to vote a retrenchment.

II. Every man to be called fairly in turn, by list, on board of prizes because, (over and above their proper share) they were on these occasions allowed a shift of clothes: but if they defrauded the company to the value of a dollar in plate, jewels, or money, marooning was their punishment. If the robbery was only betwixt one another, they contented themselves with slitting the ears and nose of him that was guilty, and set him on shore, not in an uninhabited place, but somewhere, where he was sure to encounter hardships.

III. No person to game at cards or dice for money.

IV. The lights and candles to be put out at eight o'clock at night: if any of the crew, after that hour still remained inclined for drinking, they were to do it on the open deck.

V. To keep their piece, pistols, and cutlass clean and fit for service.

VI. No boy or woman to be allowed amongst them. If any man were to be found seducing any of the latter sex, and carried her to sea, disguised, he was to suffer death; (so that when any fell into their hands, as it chanced in the Onslow, they put a sentinel immediately over her to prevent ill consequences from so dangerous an instrument of division and quarrel; but then here lies the roguery; they contend who shall be sentinel, which happens generally to one of the greatest bullies, who, to secure the lady's virtue, will let none lie with her but himself.)

VII. To desert the ship or their quarters in battle, was punished with death or marooning.

VIII. No striking one another on board, but every man's quarrels to be ended on shore, at sword and pistol. (The quarter-master of the ship, when the parties will not come to any reconciliation, accompanies them on shore with what assistance he thinks proper, and turns the disputant back to back, at so many paces distance; at the word of command, they turn and fire immediately (or else the piece is knocked out of their hands). If both miss, they come to their cutlasses, and then he is declared the victor who draws the first blood.)

IX. No man to talk of breaking up their way of living, till each had shared one thousand pounds [equivalent to £195,000 in 2025]. If to this, any man should lose a limb, or become a cripple in their service, he was to have eight hundred dollars, out of the public stock, and for lesser hurts, proportionately.

X. The Captain and Quartermaster to receive two shares of a prize: the master, boatswain, and gunner, one share and a half, and other officers one and quarter.

XI. The musicians to have rest on the Sabbath Day, but the other six days and nights, none without special favour.

=== Articles of John Phillips ===
Captain John Phillips, captain of the Revenge, also set a code for his men in 1724:

I. Every Man Shall obey civil Command; the Captain shall have one full Share and a half of all Prizes; the Master, Carpenter, Boatswain and Gunner shall have one Share and quarter.

II. If any Man shall offer to run away, or keep any Secret from the Company, he shall be marooned with one Bottle of Powder, one Bottle of Water, one small Arm, and Shot.

III. If any Man shall steal any Thing in the Company, or game, to the Value of a Piece of Eight, he shall be marooned or shot.

IV. If any time we shall meet another Marooner that Man shall sign his Articles without the Consent of our Company, shall suffer such Punishment as the Captain and Company shall think fit.

V. That Man that shall strike another whilst these Articles are in force, shall receive Moses’ Law (that is, 40 Stripes lacking one) on the bare Back.

VI. That Man that shall snap his Arms, or smoke Tobacco in the Hold, without a Cap to his Pipe, or carry a Candle lighted without a Lanthorn, shall suffer the same Punishment as in the former Article.

VII. That Man shall not keep his Arms clean, fit for an Engagement, or neglect his Business, shall be cut off from his Share, and suffer such other Punishment as the Captain and the Company shall think fit.

VIII. If any Man shall lose a Joint in time of an Engagement, shall have 400 Pieces of Eight; if a Limb, 800.

IX. If at any time you meet with a prudent Woman, that Man that offers to meddle with her, without her Consent, shall suffer present Death.

=== Articles of Edward Low and George Lowther ===
The articles listed below are attributed by the Boston News-Letter to Captain Edward Low. The first eight of these articles are essentially identical to those attributed to pirate captain George Lowther by Charles Johnson. Since Lowther and Low are known to have sailed together from about New Year's to 28 May 1722, it is probable that both reports are correct and that Low and Lowther shared the same articles, with Low's two extra articles being an ordinance, or amendment, adopted after the two crews separated.

I. The Captain is to have two full Shares; the Quartermaster is to have one Share and one Half; The Doctor, Mate, Gunner and Boatswain, one Share and one Quarter.

II. He that shall be found guilty of taking up any Unlawful Weapon on Board the Privateer or any other prize by us taken, so as to Strike or Abuse one another in any regard, shall suffer what Punishment the Captain and the Majority of the Company shall see fit.

III. He that shall be found Guilty of Cowardice in the time of engagements, shall suffer what Punishment the Captain and the Majority of the Company shall think fit.

IV. If any Gold, Jewels, Silver, &c. be found on Board of any Prize or Prizes to the value of a Piece of Eight, & the finder do not deliver it to the Quarter Master in the space of 24 hours he shall suffer what Punishment the Captain and the Majority of the Company shall think fit.

V. He that is found Guilty of Gaming, or Defrauding one another to the value of a Royal of Plate, shall suffer what Punishment the Captain and the Majority of the Company shall think fit.

VI. He that shall have the Misfortune to lose a Limb in time of Engagement, shall have the Sum of Six hundred pieces of Eight, and remain aboard as long as he shall think fit.

VII. Good Quarters to be given when Craved.

VIII. He that sees a Sail first, shall have the best Pistol or Small Arm aboard of her.

IX. He that shall be guilty of Drunkenness in time of Engagement shall suffer what Punishment the Captain and Majority of the Company shall think fit.

X. No snapping of Guns in the Hold.

=== Articles of John Gow ===
A set of articles written in John Gow's own hand was found aboard his ship, the Revenge (née George), in 1729. Article IV's reference to no going ashore "till the ship is off the ground" suggests that the Revenge was already grounded when the articles were written, only days before Gow and his men were captured. The code states as follows:

I. That every man shall obey his commander in all respects, as if the ship was his own, and as if he received monthly wages.

II. That no man shall give, or dispose of, the ship's provisions; but every one shall have an equal share.

III. That no man shall open, or declare to any person or persons, who they are, or what designs they are upon; and any persons so offending shall be punished with immediate death.

IV. That no man shall go on shore till the ship is off the ground, and in readiness to put to sea.

V. That every man shall keep his watch night and day; and at the hour of eight in the evening every one shall retire from gaming and drinking, to attend his respective station.

VI. Every person who shall offend against any of these articles shall be punished with death, or in such other manner as the ship's company shall think proper.

=== Articles of Henry Morgan and other buccaneers ===
Exquemelin writes in general terms about the articles of late 17th century Caribbean buccaneers. Although he does not attribute these articles to any specific buccaneer captain, Exquemelin almost certainly sailed with Henry Morgan as a physician, and thus his account likely reflects Morgan's articles more accurately than any other privateer or buccaneer of the time.

Exquemelin writes that the buccaneers "agree on certain articles, which are put in writing, by way of bond or obligation, which every one is bound to observe, and all of them, or the chief, set their hands to it." Although Exquemelin does not number the articles, the following approximately reflects his description of the buccaneers' laws:

I. The fund of all payments under the articles is the stock of what is gotten by the expedition, following the same law as other pirates, that is, No prey, no pay.

II. Compensation is provided the Captain for the use of his ship, and the salary of the carpenter, or shipwright, who mended, careened, and rigged the vessel (the latter usually about 150 pieces of eight). A sum for provisions and victuals is specified, usually 200 pieces of eight. A salary and compensation is specified for the surgeon and his medicine chest, usually 250 pieces of eight.

III. A standard compensation is provided for maimed and mutilated buccaneers. "Thus they order for the loss of a right arm six hundred pieces of eight, or six slaves; for the loss of a left arm five hundred pieces of eight, or five slaves; for a right leg five hundred pieces of eight, or five slaves; for the left leg four hundred pieces of eight, or four slaves; for an eye one hundred pieces of eight, or one slave; for a finger of the hand the same reward as for the eye.

IV. Shares of booty are provided as follows: "the Captain, or chief Commander, is allotted five or six portions to what the ordinary seamen have; the Master's Mate only two; and Officers proportionate to their employment. After whom they draw equal parts from the highest even to the lowest mariner, the boys not being omitted. For even these draw half a share, by reason that, when they happen to take a better vessel than their own, it is the duty of the boys to set fire to the ship or boat wherein they are, and then retire to the prize which they have taken."

V. "In the prizes they take, it is severely prohibited to every one to usurp anything, in particular to themselves. ... Yea, they make a solemn oath to each other not to abscond, or conceal the least thing they find amongst the prey. If afterwards any one is found unfaithful, who has contravened the said oath, immediately he is separated and turned out of the society."

== Establishment of pirate codes ==
The pirate articles were not codes of chivalry, they were established to keep things running smoothly and peacefully onboard the ship. The first and most important step after a pirate crew formed was to draft the code under which it would sail. The codes were considered to be legally binding, and there were swift and severe consequences for those that broke them. There was, however, no official hierarchy, and every vote carried equal weight in establishing these codes. The captain’s authority was not absolute, though the articles might have been influenced by his leadership style and the crew’s goals and experiences. The captain’s primary duties included navigation and deciding when to engage in naval warfare, but the quartermaster was responsible for overseeing daily operations, including interpreting the Articles.

Pirates established articles of conduct which were more democratic than those of naval or merchant marines, though the punishments for violating them were brutal. A common form of punishment was being marooned. Execution by hanging was another common practice. Pirate Articles also stated that goods taken from another ship during a raid were to be fairly distributed among the crew. Some Pirate articles dictated that no women were permitted aboard ships, and violating this code could be punishable by death.

== Richard Braithwaite and hydrarchy ==
Scholars Peter Linebaugh and Marcus Rediker examine and discuss hydrarchy, which was a term devised by writer Richard Braithwaite to describe two significant changes which were the formalization of maritime law or "maritime state from above," and the establishment of mariners’ codes or "self-organization of sailors from below" during the 17th century. Braithwaite noted that these sailors did not possess "much civility; the sea hath taught him other rhetoric…" referring to them as tough, crude and stupid but acknowledging their significance and contributions within the hydrarchy. Life was always complex onboard ship and during this time, the emergence of resistance and revolution at sea challenged the rise of capitalism and imperialism.

== See also ==
- Ching Shih
- Distribution of justice
- Governance in 18th-century piracy
- Parley, part of the code according to the Pirates of the Caribbean film series.
- Piracy in the Caribbean
- Pirates in popular culture
- Richard Taylor, another Golden Age pirate whose Articles were recorded by witnesses
