= Captain Veale =

Name of two unrelated American pirates

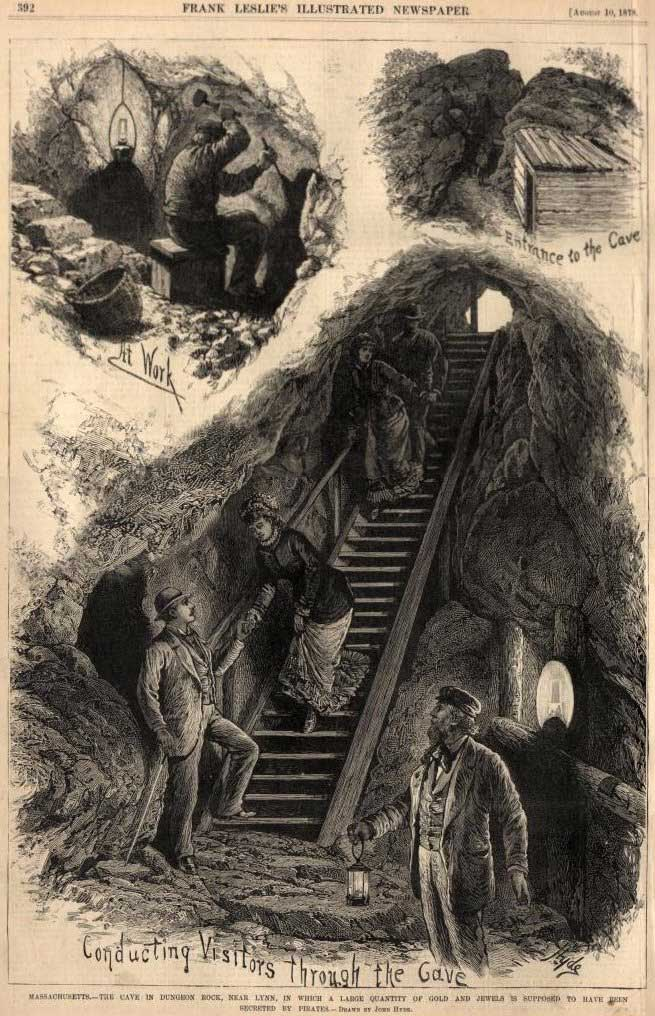
Hiram Marble's excavation of Veale's treasure at Dungeon Rock (Lynn, MA), from Frank Leslie's Illustrated Newspaper, August 1878).

“Captain Veale” was the name shared by two unrelated Massachusetts pirates active in the 17th century. The first, Thomas Veale, was known for legends of his buried treasure. The second Veale attacked ships along New England from Virginia to Boston with pirate John Graham.

== Thomas Veale’s Buried Treasure ==
Thomas Veale (or Veal) and three other pirates sailed up the Saugus River in the middle of the 17th century. They were seen carrying a chest but disappeared after purchasing digging tools and other supplies from the locals. They built a shelter and brought a woman with them, supposedly a bride to one of the pirates, but she took ill and died soon after. The authorities raided the pirate camp and arrested three of them, sending them back to England to be hanged. The fourth, Veale, hid in a nearby cave where he lived for a time, occasionally working as a cordwainer. When a large earthquake struck the area in 1658 the cave collapsed, killing Veale and burying his treasure with him.

The area (near Lynn, Massachusetts) was known as Pirates’ Rock and later Dungeon Rock. Hiram Marble and his son purchased the land in 1852 and spent decades trying to find Veale’s treasure. They began charging for cave tours to help finance their dig but eventually gave up, unsuccessful. The area has been restored and is now accessible to tourists.

== Graham and Veale off New England ==
Merchant Captain John Prentice sailed into the harbor at New London, Connecticut in 1685, anchoring alongside a sloop commanded by Captain Veale. In town Veale and his cargo master were seen attempting to buy cannons, offering enormous sums for them. A merchant captain from Pennsylvania who'd been attacked by Veale near Virginia recognized him and contacted officials. Veale and his crew quickly put to sea and fled. Prentice left for Boston soon after, spotting a small boat shuttling between Veale’s sloop and a nearby 14-man shallop. Prentice recognized the shallop's commander as John Graham. Veale chased Prentice, engaging in an hour-long running battle. Prentice escaped when a thunderstorm allowed him to put distance between his ship and Veale's. Prentice docked in Boston and alerted town officials that Veale and Greham were in the area. Boston magistrates commissioned Samson Waters as a privateer, authorizing him to raise a militia and take a barque to capture the pirates. Few locals signed up until magistrates offered a share of plunder if the pirates were captured, and revealed that a sailor had seen silver, furs, and other treasures aboard Veale's sloop. Waters sailed but Graham and Veale had already departed the area. He was sent out again in 1686 when Veale and Graham were reported in the area but was once more unsuccessful.

== See also ==
- Thomas Pound, another pirate out of Boston who was active around New England just a few years after Graham and Veale.
