= Rolls of Oléron =

Sea law written in the late 12th century

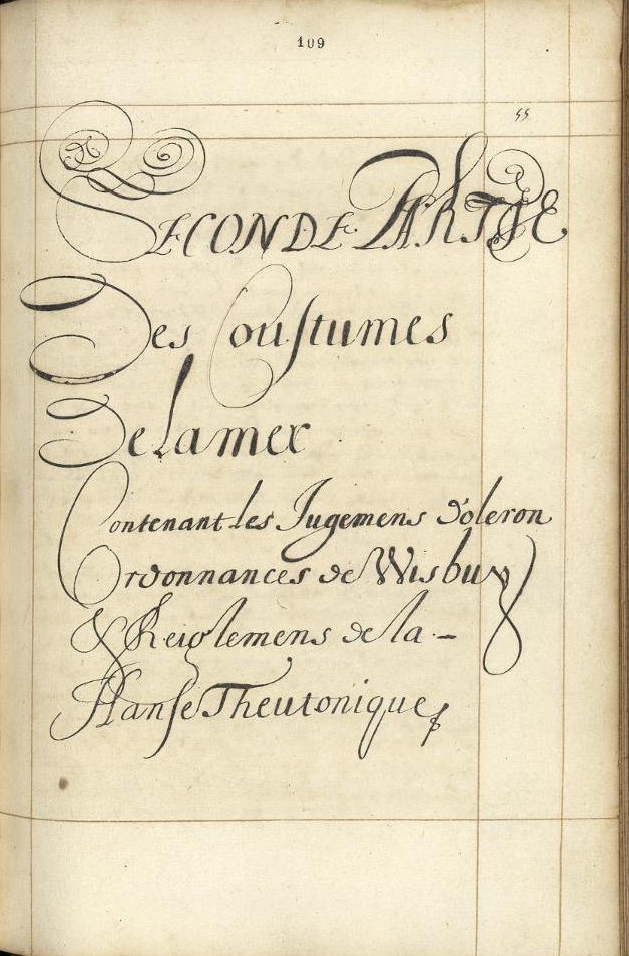
- Created: Between 1160 and 1286
- Purpose: Maritime law

The Rolls of Oléron (French: Jugements de la mer, Rôles d'Oléron) are the oldest and best-known sea law regulating medieval shipping in North-western Europe. The Rolls of Oleron were the first common sea law written in the Isle of Oléron, France, in the late 12th century, prior to 1180, later evolving to encompass Northern Europe. Any later sea laws written in Northern Europe are largely based on or inspired by the Rôles d'Oléron.

== Origin ==
The Rolls of Oleron originally regulated the wine trade from Brittany and Normandy to England, Scotland and Flanders but were widely disseminated in the later Middle Ages and became an important sea law.

=== Different sources of origin ===
There is some disagreement among historians as to how and when the Rolls of Oléron came into existence. One of the oldest beliefs is that Eleanor of Aquitaine had the laws written down around 1160 when she returned from the Holy Land. Another theory is that her son, Richard I, had them written down after his own return from the Holy Land towards the end of the 12th century, but that is highly unlikely. There is no sign in the Rolls that someone as important as a king or queen had anything to do with its creation.

Some recent historians have argued that the Rolls were written in the 13th century, between 1224 and 1286.

== Etymology ==
The Rolls of Oleron are named after the Isle of Oléron for an unclear reason. One theory is that one of the manuscripts was copied from an exemplar of the ‘Jugements de la mer’' that was kept on the island and that the name stuck.

The Rolls of Oleron are known by a variety of names, which include the "Rules of Oléron”, the "Law of Oléron", the "Charter of Oléron of the Judgments of the Sea" and the "Judgements of Oléron". Its Flemish translation became known as the “Vonnesse van Damme”.

== Structure and content ==
The original text of the Rolls of Oleron contained 24 articles, but because some articles were subsequently omitted, divided or combined in the various copies, surviving texts sometimes include a different number of judgements. Each article regulates aspects of sea shipping, such as the payment of freightage in case of shipwreck, the reimbursement of damages, and the securement of both the ship and the cargo.

== Distribution and common usage ==
In France, the Rolls of Oleron had been adopted as the official sea law by 1364.

The document was originally written in French and later translated into Spanish, Scots and Flemish/Dutch. It is likely that the Scots translation is based on the French version because of similarities. It does not appear that the court in Aberdeen used the translated version in its legal practice.

The Flemish/Dutch translation is known as the Vonesse van Damme. The oldest extant copies of the Rolls are in the Little Red Book of Bristol and the Liber Horn. In the second half of the 14th century, the Ordinancie appeared as a new sea law in the Zuiderzee area in the Netherlands. In most manuscripts, that law was combined with the Vonesse van Damme. Some historians have argued that the Ordinancie was written as a supplement to the Rolls, but that is not likely because two laws in the Ordinancie were copied directly from the Rolls, and the rest regulates approximately the same subjects as the Rolls.

The Rolls of Oleron had been officially adopted in England by the reign of King Edward III: in 1351, a Bristol inquest confirmed that the rolls had statute of law. Most shipment of wine was done with English ships and crew. Therefore, the crew needed to know the rules. According to Albrecht Cordes, in the 14th century, the influence of the Rolls of Oleron extended to Spain and, most importantly, to Flanders, where they were translated into Flemish. However, the Rolls of Oleron were integrated in the Navarrese charter of San Sebastián in 1180, which summarized practices already used along the coast of the Cantabrian Sea (Gulf of Biscay) and overall the European Atlantic coast. The Rolls of Oleron were relatively short compared to other contemporary sea laws and, as such, can be considered to have been among the easiest to use.

Sometimes known as the "Lawes of Pleron," they also formed the basis of similar agreements among 17th and 18th century privateers and pirates, known as Articles.

== Today ==
The Rolls of Oleron were included in the Black Book of the Admiralty in 1336, but the original book disappeared from the registry of the High Court of Admiralty at the beginning of the 19th century. Only a few manuscript copies of parts of this book, some dating to about 1420, are extant and kept in the British Library and the Bodleian Library. The laws are still occasionally cited as authority by U.S. courts.

== Bibliography ==
- Frankot, Edda (2007). "Medieval Maritime Law from Oléron to Wisby: Jurisdictions in the Law of the Sea" (PDF). In Pan-Montojo, Juan; Pedersen, Frederik (eds.). Communities in European history. Representations, jurisdictions, conflicts. Assoiciation of American Presses. pp. 151–172. ISBN 9788884924629.
- Frankot, Edda (2010). "Maritime Law and Practice in Late Medieval Aberdeen". The Scottish Historical Review. 89 (228): 136–152. doi:10.3366/E0036924110001459. JSTOR 23073503.
- Frankot, Edda (2012). 'Of Laws of Ships and Shipmen': Medieval Maritime Law and its Practice in Urban Northern Europe. Edinburgh: Edinburgh University Press. doi:10.3366/edinburgh/9780748646241.001.0001. ISBN 9780748646241.
- Runyan, Timothy J. (1975). "The Rolls of Oleron and the Admiralty Court in Fourteenth Century England". The American Journal of Legal History. 19 (2): 95–111. doi:10.2307/844801. JSTOR 844801.
- Tetley, William (2002). "Maritime Liens in the Conflict of Laws" (PDF). In Nafziger, James; Symeonides, Symeon (eds.). Law and Justice in a Multistate World. Transnational Publishers Inc. pp. 439–457.

== See also ==
- Lex mercatoria
- Book of the Consulate of the Sea
- Laws of Wisbuy
- Law of the sea
