= John Graham (pirate) =

17th-century pirate

- Occupation: Pirate
- Years active: 1683-1686
- Piratical career
- Base of operations: New England and the African coast

John Graham (fl. 1683–1686, last name also Grayham) was an English pirate active off New England and the African coast.

== History ==
A merchant captain operating out of Port Royal, Jamaica in June 1683 reported being captured by Graham, and traveled to Boston to deliver a deposition against him. Jamaican Governor Thomas Lynch wrote a year later that Graham was not from Jamaica but was “chief pirate” among the locals.

“Doctor John Graham” was recorded as a ship's doctor aboard a vessel which left Jamaica in 1684 on a trading and privateering mission. Graham led a mutiny, marooning the previous commander and turning the ship to piracy. A captured sailor reported, “Thence they sailed for Virginia and New England, thence to the Guinea Coast (Gambia), and back to Carolina, where she was wrecked.” They had taken several ships off Sierra Leone, possibly under a different captain, possibly under Graham.

After arriving back off the American coast, Graham was captured and jailed in Nantucket. He escaped with the help of some Cape Cod locals. Connecticut and Rhode Island officials put out alerts and warned officers to be ready to arrest him.

Later in 1685 merchant Captain John Prentice put into New London, Connecticut, where a sloop under Captain Veale anchored by his ship. Onshore he observed Veale and his cargo master trying to buy cannons. Another merchant captain recognized Veale as a pirate who had attacked him off Virginia and alerted the authorities, causing Veale to sail away. Prentice set sail a few days later, noticing Veale's sloop alongside a 14-man shallop, which he saw was commanded by Graham. They pursued Prentice, exchanging cannon fire until Prentice was able to escape under cover of a thunderstorm. He sailed to Boston, where Graham's reputation preceded him, and informed officials that Graham and Veale were nearby. Boston authorities sent out a privateer barque under Samson Waters to arrest them, but the pirates had made a getaway toward Cape Ann.

In 1686 Graham and Veale were still sailing in concert, cruising off New England. Samson Waters was again commissioned by Massachusetts to hunt them down, again unsuccessfully.

== See also ==
- Thomas Pound, another pirate out of Boston who was active around New England a few years after Graham and Veale.
