= Distribution of justice =

Justice system used by pirates

The distribution of justice was a practice commonly adopted by pirates. Ships operated as limited democracies (for more details, see pirate code) and imposed their ideas of justice upon the crew of the ship that they captured. After capture, the crew would be questioned as to whether they had suffered cruel or unjust treatment from the commander of the ship. Any commanders "against whom Complaint was made" would be punished or even executed. This punishment was not indiscriminately given to all ships' commanders. An "honest Fellow that never abused any Sailors" would be rewarded, and sometimes freed.

This distribution of justice was seen as of profound importance by pirates. Bartholomew Roberts' crew even designated a member of his crew, George Wilson, as their "Dispenser of Justice".

Linebaugh and Rediker describe the early eighteenth-century pirate ship as "democratic in an undemocratic age" as well as "egalitarian in a hierarchical age, as pirates divided their plunder equally, leveling all the elaborate structure of pay ranks common to all other maritime employments." Pirates during this time period "distributed justice, elected officers, divided loot equally, and establish a different discipline. They limited the authority of the captain, resisted many of the practices of the capitalists merchant shipping industry, and maintained a multicultural, multiracial, multinational social order."

== See also ==
- Pirate code
- Bartholomew Roberts
- Thalassocracy
- Libertatia
