= Hendrik Antonie Lodewijk Hamelberg =

Dutch lawyer

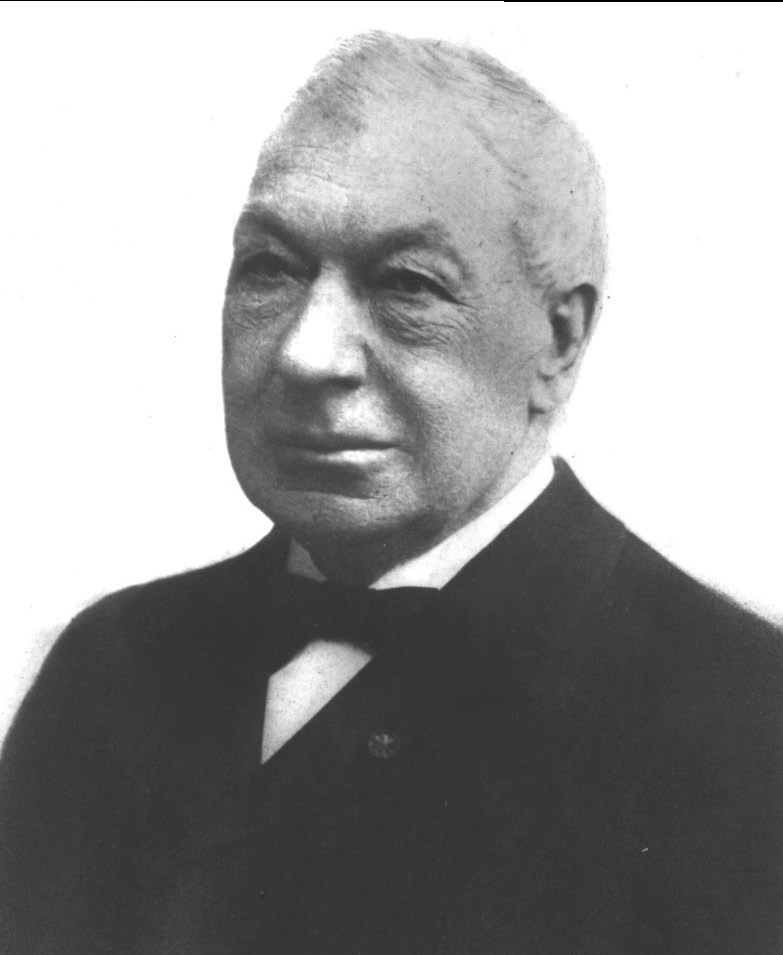

Secretary of the Volksraad of the Orange Free State
- In office August 1856 – February 1857

Member of the Volksraad of the Orange Free State
- In office 1858–1859
- Constituency: Onder-Valschrivier
- In office 1864–1871
- Constituency: Bethunie

Member of the Executive Council of the Orange Free State
- In office 26 February 1866 – 17 January 1867

Consul General and Special Envoy of the Orange Free State in the Netherlands
- In office 4 July 1871 – 29 September 1896

Personal details
- Born: 2 May 1826 Zaltbommel, Netherlands
- Died: 29 September 1896 (aged 70) Arnhem, Netherlands
- Spouse: Dorcas Lucas
- Education: Utrecht University, Netherlands
- Occupation: Politician, civil servant, diplomat
- Profession: Lawyer

Hendrik Antonie Lodewijk Hamelberg (Zaltbommel, 2 May 1826 – Arnhem, Netherlands, 29 September 1896) was a Dutch lawyer who settled in the Orange Free State, where he became a member of the Volksraad. After his return to the Netherlands he acted as consul general and special envoy for that republic in Europe (1871-1896).
