= Ulrich Gerard Lauts =

Ulrich Gerard Lauts (Amsterdam, 19 May 1787 – Utrecht, Netherlands, 25 July 1865), originally a merchant, later a teacher and professor of Dutch language and literature at the Museum for Science and Arts in Brussels and later at the Royal Naval Institute in Medemblik. Lauts was an early protagonist of the cause of the South African Voortrekkers and Dutch migration to the new Boer republics.
