= Piracy networks in Nigeria =

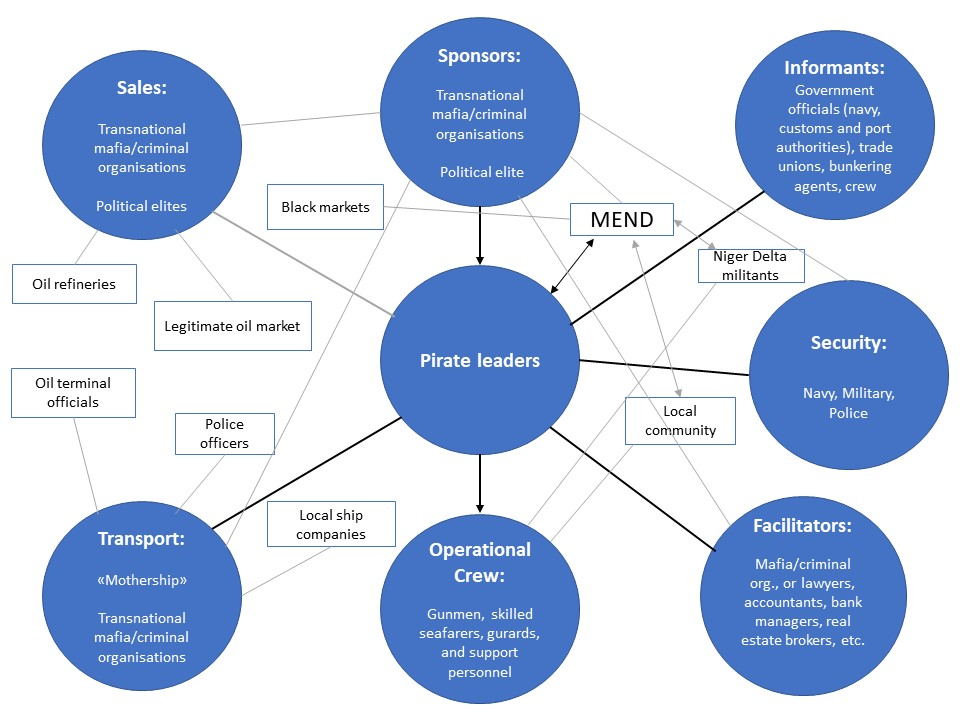
Network map of the piracy network in Nigeria

Piracy network in Nigeria refers to the organisation of actors involved in the sophisticated, complex piracy activities: piracy kidnappings and petro-piracy. The most organised piracy activities in the Gulf of Guinea takes place in the Niger Delta region of Nigeria. A large number of both non-state and formal state actors are involved in a piracy operation, indicating a vast social network. As revealed by the arrested pirate Bless Nube "we do not work in isolation. We have a network of ministries' workers. What they do is to give us information on the location and content of the vessels to be hijacked. After furnishing us with the information, they would make part payment, and after the hijack, they would pay us the balance." Pirate groups draw on the pirate network to gain access to actors who provide security, economic resources, and support to pirate operations. This includes government officials, businesspeople, armed groups, and transnational mafia.

The organisation of the piracy network is not based around a single person, pirate group, or ethnic group, but rather based on cooperation between the involved actors. Members of the piracy network are hired on a case-to-case basis, based on their skill and contribution to each piracy operations. Members can enter and exit the piracy network as they please, thus the organisational structure varies from operation to operation. The average piracy operation requires between 40-60 members. This includes the pirate groups directly involved in attacks, and other players who can provide financing, insider information, ransom negotiation and money laundering, and facilitate sales of stolen goods. From the pirate groups, usually 3-10 pirates participate in attacks. On rare occasions, up to 20-30 pirates in multiple speedboats participate in attacks. Although membership is fluid, the various roles needed for successful piracy operations are not. These roles include pirate leaders, operational crew, sponsors, informants, security, facilitators, transport, and sales.

== Organisation of the piracy modus operandi ==
Piracy kidnappings and petro-piracy have slightly different modus operandi, and therefore the organisation of such operations is different. Kidnapping is a lengthy process, where a long time may pass between the attack and receiving payout. The operations are therefore organised in a way that prevents state authorities from interfering at any time of this process. Petro-piracy, on the other hand, must navigate state institutions to gain access to oil markets. This requires strong cooperation with formal actors within the Nigerian economy.

=== Piracy kidnappings ===
The organisation of piracy kidnappings is complex, and require extensive planning, long-term commitment, heavy weaponry, and intelligence. Additionally, it must have support networks for security and economic resources. The main actors included in piracy kidnappings are therefore pirate leaders, operational crew, sponsors, informants, security, facilitators and sometimes transport. In the preparation phase the pirate leaders create the tactical plan and locate an appropriate target. In this phase, the necessary financing, operational crew, intelligence, equipment, supplies, and if necessary, a "mothership" is gathered for the operation. This process invites many opportunities for corrupt officials to finance operations and provide information and access to resources. All planning and preparative activities are performed at the operational bases of the pirate groups, usually located in the Niger Delta. The crew of pirates, usually young men, participating in the attack-phase are recruited from local communities. The pirates involved in piracy kidnappings often have strong ties to local militias and rebel groups, such as the Movement for the Emancipation of the Niger Delta (MEND). This is because the kidnapping of foreign oil workers is considered an important instrument to MENDs political struggles against the government and oil companies in the Niger Delta. In the post-attack phase, pirate groups need facilitators to perform ransom negotiation and money laundering. Furthermore, close connections to security personnel are highly important in this phase, as it allows pirates to hold hostages up to 10 days without being apprehended by Nigerian security forces. Since 2011, no pirate have been arrested in relation to piracy kidnappings despite dozens being kidnapped every year.

=== Petro-piracy ===
Like piracy kidnappings, the organisation of petro-piracy is complex, and require extensive planning, heavy weaponry, intelligence, and financing. Moreover, pirate groups are dependent on strong connections to corrupt officials to gain access to security and to Nigerian economic infrastructures. Still, petro-piracy is organised a little differently than piracy kidnappings, as oil theft is often offered as a service by pirate groups for a lump sum. This means the pirate groups are hired by sponsors who are interested in the financial gain from petro-piracy. When employed by a sponsor, the pirate leader start planning and preparing the operation. This includes recruiting an operational crew, obtaining intelligence, and securing equipment, supplies, and a "mothership". Important to successful operations, corrupt officials and insiders in the shipping and oil industry provide necessary information about the targets. Similar to piracy kidnapping, the operational crew in petro-piracy operations are recruited from local communities through MEND. Nevertheless, this type of operation requires greater amount of skill than kidnappings. During the attack-phase, the pirates need to possess and operate their own oil tanker and cargo ship (the "mothership") to carry the stolen oil. Furthermore, the operation requires several small boats for the attack. Connections to corrupt members within security forces allow the pirate groups to operate without fear of apprehension. Oftentimes the sponsors pay security forces to participate in the operation by providing security during attacks. In the post-attack phase, the oil is transported to designated destinations. The sponsors either acts as transporters of the stolen oil, or they direct the pirate groups on where to deliver it. Once the pirate groups have delivered the stolen goods, their participation in the operation is over. The oil is then sold either on the black market or in the legitimate Nigerian oil market. The sponsors are usually engaged in sales, together with facilitators involved with oil trading and money laundering. The main actors involved in petro-piracy are thus pirate leaders, organisational crew, sponsors, informants, security, facilitators, transport, and sales.

== Important facilitators of the piracy network ==
=== MEND ===
Pirate groups gain access to local communities, black markets, and important channels of communication through cooperation with local criminal and militant groups. The Movement for the Emancipation of the Niger Delta (MEND) is the most significant militant group working together with pirate groups. In fact, since the emergence of MEND in 2006 there has been a sharp increase in piracy activities. MEND serves as an umbrella organisation for several militant groups in the Niger Delta, and therefore has deep roots in the local communities in here. The pirate groups are able to gain community support though their cooperation with MEND. This is important for both the protection of the pirate groups, but also for their access to local youths whom they recruit for operations. Often, local communities tolerate the pirate groups because they fear retribution from militants if they criticise them. MEND gain from this cooperation as the pirate activities are an important tool for their political objectives. Both piracy kidnappings and petro-piracy are considered operational tactics in the militant protests by MEND. Furthermore, MEND receive financial resources from the pirate activities to fund their political struggles. In return, the pirate groups benefit from the criminal network of MEND, drawing linkages with armed groups, transnational mafia organisations, transnational criminal groups, and political sponsors within Nigeria. For instance, weapons originating from criminals in Libya flow to the hands of the pirates though MEND.

=== Corruption ===
Corruption in Nigeria is widespread, and the pirate groups benefit greatly from this. Corruption within the economic infrastructure and state institutions, especially in oil production and regulation, is a central aspect of piracy organisation. "Corrupt elements within state institutions that regulate and protect oil production not only fuel pirate grievances but also enable piracy networks to establish informal links with those engaged in oil production, processing, distribution, and transportation". Nigeria's oil sector is one of the least transparent in the world, which is why it is easily exploited by criminal groups. Furthermore, corruption within Nigerian political elite and security forces enable successful operations. The leading pirates are protected by political sponsors who bribe off security forces, making the pirates essentially "untouchable by the law". Pirate groups have oftentimes hijacked vessels, and remained on board for days at a time without interference by security forces. Even when provided with the names, locations, and registration numbers of the boats used for attacks, the law enforcements have not intervened. In the rare occasion pirates are arrested, they are released shortly after. "Corruption appears to be key to successful operations"; This is especially true for petro-piracy, but also important for piracy kidnappings. Rent-seeking members in all levels of society engage in piracy due to the financial temptations of the "business opportunities" pirate activities present.

== Main actors ==
=== Pirate leaders ===
The pirate leaders are local community members who coordinate and direct piracy operations. This includes organising financing, crew, and weapons needed for successful operations. The pirate leaders have access to all the actors within the piracy network and use these relations to acquire insider information and other relevant economic and security resources needed to conduct piracy attacks. The pirate leaders strive to keep their activities and relations secret, to keep their network hidden. Even the information they pass on to the operational crew is limited.

=== Operational crew ===
The group of pirates directly involved in the execution of piracy kidnappings and oil-bunkering are called operational crew. They are the ones who drive the boats, board the vessels, bear arms, conduct the kidnappings or oil-theft, etc. These people are often recruited from local communities, and usually consist of young men. The necessary actors included for successful operations include attack personnel, guards, and support personnel. The attack personnel consist of gunmen who are recruited from local armed groups, and skilled seafarers, often unemployed fishermen. The guards provide security on land, protecting the operational bases for the pirate groups. The support personnel include actors such as cooks and mechanics.

=== Sponsors ===
Both forms of organised piracy in Nigeria involves sponsor who finance operational activities. In piracy kidnappings, the pirate leaders draw on their network to find a sponsor to finance their activities. In petro-piracy, on the other hand, the sponsor recruits the pirate groups to perform the operations. Often, piracy is sponsored by transnational "trade investors", such as Eastern European and Asian criminal networks and mafias. Other prominent sponsors include members of the Nigerian political elite, such as government officials, politicians, and corporate interest. During election times, politicians increasingly sponsor piracy as a political strategy against their opponents. Furthermore, pirate groups are often manipulated for political gain. "For instance, elections have linkages with piracy because politicians fund and supply violent gangs with weapons to suppress opposition, as in 2003 and 2007."

=== Informants ===
For pirate operations to be successful, the pirate groups rely on insider information about ships, routes, and cargo. This helps the pirate groups decide what ships to attack, the right location for attack, and how many members are needed for successful attack. From this information, the pirate leaders can and prepare a tactical strategy. To facilitate this, the pirate leaders have close connections to actors with access to this kind of information. Therefore, the actors serving as informants include corrupt officials within the navy, customs and port authorities, corrupt members of trade unions and bunkering agents, and even dissatisfied crew members of the targeted ships.

=== Security ===
The pirate groups must consider the responses to their operations by the targeted ships (who might armed), local security forces such as the army, navy and police, and the local community. Security forces and local communities are often bribed to "look the other way" during pirate operations, giving the pirates free access to "oil theft opportunities". Sometimes, security forces play an active role in pirate operations, providing security during attacks in exchange of a share of the "booty". This is particularly common in the Nigerian military, while also common in the Nigerian navy and police. For instance, with piracy kidnappings "Security forces have knowledge of the ransom infrastructure and get a cut of ransom profits".

=== Facilitators ===
Large scale piracy operations need facilitators who have knowledge about the structures of the Nigerian economy. Their role includes money laundering, ransom negotiation, trading stolen goods, procurement of equipment and supplies, and organisation of transport. Actors performing these jobs consist of members of the transnational criminal gangs or mafia, and formal actors such as accountants, lawyers, real estate brokers, bank managers, etc.

=== Transport ===
In petro-piracy operations, and sometimes piracy kidnappings, the pirate group charter a "mothership" from local companies to transport their stolen goods. The crude oil obtained through piracy operations must be transported to designated spaces. Often, the transport is arranged directly with the "foreign traders" who buys the stolen oil. Other times the pirates use their "mothership" to transport the oil to destinations within or outside Nigeria, such as to specific oil refineries, tank farms or local oil companies. In such cases, the pirates usually bribe oil-terminal officials and police officers to overlook the "mothership". Actors involved in transport therefore include operational crew, and members of the Eastern European and Asian criminal networks and mafias.

=== Sales ===
"After an operation, pirates may already have buyers lined up or use their connections to have access to black markets to dispose of their loot." The pirate groups themselves are not directly involved in sales, as they usually deliver the stolen goods to their sponsors for a flat sum. The sponsors direct the pirates to where they should make the transfer, and the pirates provide security until the transfer is finished. Stolen goods from pirate operations, such as crude oil, stolen vessels, and cargo, are sold either on the black market or in the legitimate oil market in Nigeria. The black market is used to facilitate the movement of oil across state-borders and beyond the Gulf of Guinea. For sales within Nigeria, members of the political elite are often involved in laundering stolen oil into the legitimate oil market. This is because they have ownership of local oil companies involved in distribution. Stolen oil is either shipped directly to a specific refinery or traded in the legitimate oil market. Here, the oil is traded by well-connected local middlemen or private commodities traders, sometimes from local oil companies.
