= Piracy kidnappings =

People being taken hostage

Piracy kidnappings occur during piracy, when people are kidnapped by pirates or taken hostage. Article 1 of the United Nations International Convention against the Taking of Hostages defines a hostage-taker as "any person who seizes or detains and threatens to kill, to injure, or to continue to detain another person (hereinafter referred to as the 'hostage') in order to compel a third party namely, a State, an international intergovernmental organization, a natural or Juridical person, or a group of people, to do or abstain from doing any act as an explicit or implicit condition for the release of the hostage commits the offense of taking of hostages ("hostage-taking") within the meaning of this convention." Kidnappers often try to obtain the largest financial reward possible in exchange for hostages, but piracy kidnappings can also be politically motivated.

The coast of Somalia has been a piracy hot spot since the late 1990s, threatening state security and global trade. During the early 2000s, the international community established multilateral anti-piracy initiatives such as the Combined Task Force 150; in 2008, the United Nations Security Council (UNSC) enacted Resolution 1816 to combat piracy in the Somali region. The number of incidents decreased in that region after the international initiatives, but increased in West Africa (especially in the Gulf of Guinea). In 2020, during the COVID-19 pandemic, the International Maritime Bureau (IMB) saw an increase in kidnappings in the Gulf of Guinea; 95 percent of all kidnappings of crew members of hijacked vessels took place in the gulf.

== Maritime piracy ==
The United Nations defines piracy as "any illegal acts of violence or detention, or any act of depredation, committed for private ends by the crew or the passengers of a private ship or a private aircraft" on the high seas, "against another ship or aircraft, or against persons or property on board". According to the International Marine Bureau, piracy may be considered "successful" when a vessel has been boarded by a person who is not authorised to board the ship and has criminal intentions. Two to six percent of piracy victims are foreigners; local residents are more often the target of piracy kidnappings.

Piracy incidents are often violent and include other crimes, such as drug, human or arms trafficking and illegal oil bunkering and theft (the latter sometimes called petrol piracy). The number of foreigners targeted in piracy incidents, including expatriate aid workers, has increased since 2011. Such kidnappings may take place at sea, although land-based kidnappings also occur. Although Somalia (on the Horn of Africa) was the most common piracy-attack area between 2009 and 2013, Somali pirate activities decreased between 2011 and 2013. The Gulf of Guinea has been a recent hot spot for pirate attacks, and the international community became concerned as piracy attacks in West Africa exceeded the number of attacks by Somali pirates. More international vessels are passing through the Gulf of Guinea, a valued route for international ships. The International Maritime Bureau (IMB), Oceans Beyond Piracy and the Maritime Piracy Humanitarian Response Program said that 966 sailors were attacked in 2012 by pirates in the Gulf of Guinea, and the pirates aimed to receive quick financial rewards from selling stolen oil or demanding ransom. As more international powers (such as the US, China and other European states) are becoming targets of piracy, they have taken part in several anti-piracy and capacity-building operations to combat piracy. Military, financial, and political resources have been allocated to limit the risk of conflict.

== Kidnapping for ransom ==
=== Definition ===
Ransom kidnappings occur when kidnappers hold hostages and offer their release in exchange for meeting the pirate's demands, usually monetary payment. They may be categorised as criminal or political. In a criminal kidnapping, the kidnapper's goal is almost always financial gain for himself; in a politically motivated kidnapping, the kidnapper can demand certain actions or use a ransom to finance (or expand) political activities. Kidnapping for ransom differs from pathological kidnappings for sexual motives or family abductions. Due to the complexity of a kidnapping for ransom (arranging a location to keep hostages, obtaining a negotiator and channeling the ransom), an organisational structure is required. In kidnappings by pirates, organisation is needed at sea and on land.

=== Economics of hijacking ===
In 2020, 135 maritime crew members were kidnapped for ransom by pirates; five were kidnapped in 2011. In the 2019 book Kidnap, researcher Anja Shortland described how kidnapping for ransom can be seen as a business model; in economic terms, kidnapping for ransom is a matter of supply and demand. In kidnappings by Somali pirates, negotiations lasted from six to eighteen months. As the pirates discovered the value of international vessels, ransom demands increased and hostages were kept for a longer time. In contrast to Somali pirates, who took hostages for about 11 months, pirates of the Gulf of Guinea held hostages for four days.

To obtain the ransom, hostages were asked to make a list of people who could make (or contribute to) the payment. The higher ransoms became, the greater the expectation of obtaining financial rewards from the next kidnapping; this led to an increase in recruitment of young men attracted by money. The World Bank calculated that ransom payments are distributed as follows: 5.4 percent is spent on the sea pirates; 8.3 percent compensates investors and creditors, and the remaining 82.3 percent is disbursed amongst the people on land who assisted the pirates.

Annual turnover from ransom kidnapping is estimated as high as $1.5 billion. Holding hostages could be profitable from a business perspective, and kidnapping for ransom a profitable business model. If the ransom payment is delayed or too low, however, keeping a hostage alive and in good health could be inefficient. Employers can purchase kidnap and ransom insurance from insurance companies, such as Lloyd's. Insurance is purchased without employee knowledge, to prevent it from influencing employee behavior. Insurance premiums rise if piracy incidents increase.

=== Ransom bans ===
Some countries, such as the United Kingdom and the United States, refuse to negotiate with kidnappers. By not negotiating with hostage-takers, the countries hope to discourage kidnappers from abducting their nationals. Whether countries should implement a piracy-ransom ban is debated. Its effectiveness is uncertain, and such a policy is more applicable to situations in which foreign states are concerned about their nationals than cases involving local citizens.

=== Ransom dilemma ===
Pirates will often harm or kill hostages if a ransom is not paid; from an economic perspective, hostages have no value if they cannot be used to gain financial rewards. Paying a ransom demanded by terrorists, militants, or pirates may be viewed as an ethical dilemma, however, because such a payment would reward criminal activity. Pirates may also use ransom payments for future kidnappings or other crimes.

=== Role of clans ===
Factors influencing the emergence of piracy include economic inequality and youth unemployment, and it occurs in failed states lacking a centralised government and civil protection. Since rule-making institutions are absent, state control is often in the hands of corrupt officials; clans may assume the role of non-existent government institutions. Somalia's clan system (which has customary laws, supported by sharia) plays a significant role in the state's decision-making processes, and can influence pirate operation. Clan law may suggest that conflicts should be resolved peacefully, and violators may be penalized.

Pirates may make deals with coastal clans, who negotiate with other clans to grant safe passage to hijacked ships. They receive "protection money" in return from ransom payments, which are distributed fairly and peacefully. It is in the best interests of clan elders to provide a non-violent environment for hostages taken by pirates. In the Niger Delta, regional clans ensure that negotiations are quick and hostages are not mistreated. Handbooks were found during counter-piracy operations which stated, "Anyone shooting a hostage will immediately be shot"; pirates would be punished if hostages from hijacked ships were harmed.

=== In the media ===
In some kidnappings, a "double injunction" may be issued; news media may not publish information about the kidnapping or the negotiation process, to prevent media reports from influencing negotiations. When the media reports a kidnapping, it is generally after hostages are released. In the case of the MV Leopard, a Danish ship which was captured in January 2011 with two Danes and four Filipinos held hostage for over two years, Danish authorities advised the media not to report the kidnappings to avoid influencing ransom negotiations. Danish media followed the advice except for the tabloid Ekstra Bladet which wanted to publicize Danish hostages Søren Lyngbjørn and Eddy Lopez. Multi-millionaire ship owner John Arne Larsson was depicted unsympathetically, and ransom demands increased substantially. In May 2013, the hostages were released. According to ship-company managing director Claus Bech, the ransom amount (which was not revealed) was "considerable millions".

== Geographic overview ==
=== Somalia ===
Somalia has an environment suited to illicit activities such as piracy, and Somali piracy became more common when pirates gained access to automated information systems (AIS). Most international vessels use an AIS, which provides users with information on a vessel's position, direction and speed. Somali pirates used this information to learn where a ship would anchor, and how near the coast or the high seas a vessel was at any time. Access to weapons was relatively easy and, since commercial ships did not originally have military or armed security personnel, they could be boarded with little resistance and crew members captured. Pirates typically commanded the crew of the captured ship to sail to the coast, and crews have been used as human shields when warships were encountered at sea. Warships operating near Somalia were authorised by the United Nations Security Council to operate in the country's territorial waters. In exchange for the release of crew members, a ransom was demanded by the pirates. After multi-million-dollar ransom payments were received, kidnapping for ransom became more attractive and more foreigners were kidnapped. The more money pirates received, the more difficult it became to halt the hijackings.

==== The Chandlers (October 2009 – November 2010) ====
Paul and Rachel Chandler, a British couple, were sailing from the Seychelles to Tanzania on their yacht in October 2009 when they were seized by Somali pirates. The yacht was found empty during counter-piracy operations. Pirates demanded a $7 million ransom, telling the BBC: "NATO operations had a lot of negative impacts here. They arrest fishermen and destroy their equipment. So, when you consider the damage and all the people affected we say the amount is not big." The following month, a video was released in which Rachel Chandler asked the UK government, the British people and their family "to do whatever they can to enter into negotiations with these people to buy back our lives." The United Kingdom Foreign Office said that government policy about ransom payments was clear, and they would not pay the kidnappers. In November 2010, the Chandlers were released. The ransom payment was not disclosed, since the family "believes it would be irresponsible to discuss any aspect of the release process as this could encourage others to capture private individuals and demand large ransom payments, something that we are sure none of us wants." Contemporary reports suggested that about $1 million was paid for their release, including a $430,000 June 2010 payment which was probably received by another group instead of the pirates. After that, another ransom amount was assembled. Local citizens and clan elders were embarrassed by the pirates' exorbitant ransom demand, and clan elders arranged for the couple's release; the Chandlers then returned to the UK.

==== 2011 - 2023 in piracy ====
By 2011, counter-piracy initiatives by the international community such as the Combined Task Force 150, along with increased security measures aboard ships, greatly reduced the number of piracy attacks and kidnappings.

Piracy off the coast of Somalia surged again in the 2020s. The hijacking of the Ruen by Somali pirates was their first successful attack on commercial shipping tankers since 2017.

EUNAVFOR reported over 20 hijackings or attempted hijackings of ships in the Gulf of Aden and Somali Basin from November 2023 to March 2024.

==== MV Ruen hijacking & kidnapping (December 2023 – March 2024) ====
On December 14, the first successful commercial ship hijacking since 2017 occurred in the Gulf of Guinea, off the coast of Somalia when Maltese-flagged MV Ruen was captured by Somali pirates. The hijacked vessel was rescued by the Indian Air Force on March 16, 2024, which disarmed 35 pirates onboard and rescued the remaining 11 crew then remaining in captivity. India transferred the 35 captured Somali pirates to Mumbai to be prosecuted for hijacking the vessel and for the kidnapping of its crew.

==== MV Abdullah attack, hijacking and ransom ====
On March 12, 2024, armed pirates in small boats attacked Bangladesh-flagged bulk carrier MV Abdullah. while underway from Maputo, Mozambique to the UAE. All 23 crew members aboard were taken hostage. Somali pirates released the vessel and crew on April 14, following payment of $4.7 million ransom.

=== Gulf of Guinea ===
Piracy shifted from Somalia towards the West African coast after 2012. More pirates have been present in the Gulf of Guinea, and attacks on ships have become more threatening as pirates have access to more advanced equipment. Foreigners are the targets of hijacking for ransom, since international vessels are more prevalent in the region. The Gulf of Guinea (where most piracy occurs) lacks security measures in comparison with the international waters off Somalia. Kidnappings for ransom have gradually increased farther from the coast, however, and pirates can operate 80 to 160 kilometres (50 to 99 mi) from shore. Piracy incidents may occur on land, as well as aboard ships.

According to Oceans Beyond Piracy, pirates in the Gulf of Guinea operate primarily on commercial ships for ransom. Officials reported Nigerian pirate gangs in the Gulf of Guinea shifting, in 2019, from cargo theft to kidnapping seafaring crews in order to extort ransom from ship owners.

In the oil-rich Niger Delta region, ships are often hijacked and their oil stolen; pirates in the Gulf of Guinea rely on oil bunkering and kidnapping for ransom, with hostages generally held for a few days to a few weeks (a relatively-short time, compared to Somali kidnappings). Kidnappers receive a ransom in exchange for the hostages' release, but the payment is often lower than what was demanded. Kidnappings in the region are quick, cheap and short compared to Northern Nigeria, where the terrorist organisations Boko Haram and Ansaru operate differently: holding hostages for longer periods of time, for higher ransom payments.

=== Asia ===
Since 2013, piracy has increased in the Strait of Malacca and the South China Sea. During the COVID-19 pandemic, piracy incidents in Asia have increased. These incidents are primarily categorized as "opportunistic piracy", which may be defined as an unpremeditated act similar to armed robbery: "If you see something worth taking, you might give it a shot". Kidnappings by pirates in Asia are rare by comparison to the West African and Somali regions. On March 26, 2016, 10 Indonesian crew members from the ship Brahma 12 were kidnapped; this was the first recent sea kidnapping in the area.

==== Abu Sayyaf kidnapping (January 2020 – March 2021) ====
The Regional Cooperation Agreement on Combating Piracy and Armed Robbery against Ships in Asia (ReCAAP) said that on 17 January 2020, five crew members were kidnapped from a fishing trawler by the jihadist Abu Sayyaf group off Lahad Datu, Malaysia. Abu Sayyaf, an Islamic terrorist organisation, is known for previous attacks and kidnappings for ransom and use financial rewards from piracy attacks and ransom payments to fund further attacks. The ReCAAP, reported by the Philippine Coast Guard (PCG), said that men in black clothing and masks overpowered a fishing trawler with a grey speedboat. Crew members were rescued by the marine brigade of the Armed Forces of the Philippines (AFP) when they conducted rescue operations and discovered the capsized ship where the hostages were held. The PCG continues to share information on suspicious sea movements which can be related to Abu Sayyaf pirate activities. ReCAAP has been warned about the organisation's planning of kidnappings, targeting foreigners and abducting crew members from vessels, and maintains close contact with the PCG and shipping companies. After the abduction of the five crew members from the fishing trawler, shipping companies were advised to follow the "Guidance on Abduction of Crew in the Sulu-Celebes Seas and Waters off Eastern Sabah" covering major sea lanes in the Philippines, Malaysia and Indonesia.

==== Galaxy Leader hijacking & kidnapping (November 2023 – ongoing, April 2024) ====
On November 19, 2023, while voyaging from Körfez, Turkey to Pipavav, India, Bahamian-flagged Galaxy Leader was hijacked by Houthis in the Red Sea. Armed hijackers boarded the vessel by military helicopter. 25 crew were kidnapped, remaining in captivity as at April 23, 2024.

=== Caribbean ===
On April 4, 2024, Panama-flagged cargo ship Magalie was attacked in the Caribbean by two Haitian gangs: 5 Seconds and Taliban. (Unrelated to the Afghan Taliban.) The Magalie was captured by the armed gangs in the Varreux fuel terminal at Port-Au-Prince. The crew was taken hostage and food cargo was stolen. On April 7, the Haitian National Police stormed the seized freighter, engaging in a five-hour gun battle with the gangs, in which two police officers were injured and several of the two gang's members turned pirate were killed. The U.S.-owned ship was recovered by the Haitian police force. The crew, and any other seafarers aboard the Magalie, who were all taken hostage, remained as hostages, having been separated from their vessel prior.
