= EU initiatives against illegal maritime activities in the Gulf of Guinea =

The European Union is one of the main anti-piracy actors in the Gulf of Guinea (GoG). At any one time, the EU has on average 30 owned or flagged vessels in the region. The piracy in the Gulf of Guinea is therefore a threat towards the EU, and as a response the organization adopted its strategy on the Gulf of Guinea in March 2014. The Strategy on the Gulf of Guinea is a 12-page document with the scope of the problem, what have previously been done, responses and the way forward with four strategic objectives. The EU's overriding objective are:

1. to build a common understanding in regional countries of the threat and its long-term effect and the need to address the piracy issues among the regional and international community.
2. to help the governments in the region to ensure maritime awareness, security and the rule of law by building robust institutions and maritime administrations.
3. to assist vulnerable economies to withstand criminal or violent activity and to build resilience to communities.
4. to strengthen cooperation between the countries and organizations on the region to fight threats both on land and sea.

The main focus of the European Union's initiatives to fight piracy in Gulf of Guinea and illegal maritime activities is to address the root causes rather than taking a military approach as they did with the piracy off the coast of Somalia. The EU are addressing the root causes by supporting local and regional actions to reduce and hinder piracy and other illegal maritime activities. One of the most important supporting's are the Yaoundé Code of Conduct and capacity building in terms of knowledge, skills, training and equipment for information sharing across the borders. Even though the EU do not have a naval force in the GoG, some member states have military vessels and exercises with different countries in the region to fight piracy.

== Overarching frameworks and plans ==
=== Yaoundé Code of Conduct ===
One of the main architectures of framework that the EU supports are the Yaoundé Code of Conduct signed in June 2013 by the Economic Community of West African States (ECOWAS), Economic Community of Central African States (ECCAS) and the Gulf of Guinea Commission (GGC). This is a framework for how the African states will increase information sharing and cooperation in the maritime environment to increase maritime security and how to fight piracy and illegal activities at seas. However, the Conduct is not fully implemented yet and there still much work to be done. One of the main issues is a lack of resources and finances. A second problem is the rivalries between states. The suspicion, rivalry and competition combined with the lack of resources and finances hinders the African states in cooperating and share information, which is important to form an effective counter-piracy strategy. These issues are in the main scope of the EU initiatives.

=== The Gulf of Guinea Action Plan 2015-2020 ===
The Gulf of Guinea Action Plan 2015-2020 is a 37-page document that outlines the European Union's effort to support the coastal states of Africa to fight piracy, maritime crime and organized crime. This plan is focusing on regional dynamics and to create a common understanding that maritime crime affects the long-term economic development of the countries, and to strengthen the intra-regional cooperation and improve collaboration between the EU and its Member States, as well as international partners, in order to promote long-term security and stability through capacity building, job creation and a range of strategic initiatives in these areas. Of 2018 the EU achieved some of its first goals by strengthening governance structures, increasing mutual understanding of the scale of the threat, investment of the private sector and collaboration with the coastal communities. However, there are still under-reporting of attacks, and maritime security are still unevenly addressed among the coastal states in the Gulf of Guinea, and the link between transnational crime and maritime security, and job creation and economic growth is still not recognized enough.

== EU initiatives ==
The EU launched the Critical Maritime Routes for the Gulf of Guinea (CRIMGO) in 2013 with a budget of €4.5 million over four years. Through this project, the EU educated the coastguards to understand the piracy issue and how to manage it, and established an information sharing network between the countries to improve of maritime governance and to foster regional information sharing. This pilot project successfully delivered 14 capacity building missions and 13 crisis response trainings and supported the implementation of the Yaoundé Code of Conduct. To further deepen its initiatives, the EU created the Gulf of Guinea Action plan 2015–2020.

Gulf of Guinea Inter-Regional Network (GoGIN) is based on and the replacement of CRIMGO which ended in 2016. GoGIN have a budget of €9.2 million and are founded by the EU and will run to the end of 2021. This initiative aims to further improve the maritime safety and security in GoG by extending the supporting for efficient regional information sharing network. As an extension of CRIMGO, GoGIN will improve regional dialogue capacity and coordination in the maritime domain with the support for the implementation of the Yaoundé Code of Conduct and its process. It is the French public agency Agence Française d'Expertise Technique Internationale (Expertise France) that are implementing the project.

As CRIMGO only focused on eight states, GoGIN will: be broader in scope, covering the whole Yaoundé code of conduct framework and directly support the regional architecture decided at the Yaoundé summit. GoGIN will go deeper than the previous initiative, with more extensively assistance and training in use information systems, and it will ensure consistency with the other EU activities created of the Action plan, including the Maritime Awareness Program (MDA) and the United States' efforts in the GoG.

West and Central Africa Port Security (WeCAPS) launched in 2019 to address problems related to port security. The aims for the program are threefold, they are 1) strengthen the compliance with International Ship and Port Facility Security standards (ISPS), 2) strengthen the prevention methods and resilience through detecting and handling of illegal or dangerous goods, substances and activities, 3) strengthen the resilience of an unpredicted leakage, attacks or explosions. WeCAPS is fully founded by the EU with a budget of €8.5 million and are implemented by Expertise France and will run to 2022.

Sea Port Cooperation Project (SEACOP) aims to fight illegal maritime trafficking and criminal networks in 27 countries across West Africa, Latin America and the Caribbean. The project will supply the targeted countries with skills, IT tools and other needed equipment to establish or improve maritime information systems, strengthen intelligence capabilities and port control, and increase cooperation on national and regional level. SEACOP is implemented by FIIAPP with a period of 2010 to 2020 and founded by the EU with a budget of €3 million.

Western African Police Information System (WAPIS) is an INTERPOL initiative fully founded by the EU through the European Development Fund (EDF) with a budget of €37 million. The project started in 2012 with the overall objective to strengthen coordination and information change of the regions law enforcement by: 1) giving West African police officers access to national and regional criminal databases to improve identification and investigations, 2) improve the analysis of terrorism and organized crime in the region and increase the understanding of crimes that originated in and passed through West Africa, 3) allow greater cooperation in the juridical and police sectors within the region, the EU and rest of the world.

Support to West Africa Integrated Maritime Security (SWAIMS) program supports ECOWAS's Integrated Maritime Strategy and are founded by the 11th European Development Found West Africa Regional Indicative Programme with a budget of €29million in the time scope of 2019 - 2023. The initiative will overall increase maritime security in Gulf of Guinea by establishing strong institutions, governance and maritime policies in the coastal states. The program will also strengthen capacity building by providing equipment, training and collaboration with private sector and civil society.

Improvement of Regional Fisheries Governance in Western Africa (PESCAO) will improve food security, maritime infrastructure and build resilient coastal communities. This initiative will monitor, control and surveillance national and regional authorities to conduct control and inspection of fisheries to address IUU fishing. Furthermore, the initiative has founded four joint surveillance campaigns since 2018 and will bring together scientist and stakeholders in fisheries to build resilience in the maritime eco system. PESCAO have a budget of €15 million and will run from 2018 to 2023

Le programme d’Appui à la Stratégie de Sûreté et Sécurité Maritimes en Afrique Centrale (Support Program for Maritime Security Strategy in Central Africa (PASSMAR)) will from 2019 to 2023 focus on states national legal and juridical framework in the ECCAS region to be in line with the UN Convention on Law on the Sea. The initiative will provide the coastal Central African countries with legal expertise and assistance to the courts and prosecution process., and will coordinate with the SWAIMS and GoGIN projects. PASSMAR is assigned €10 million through the 11th EDF Central Africal Regional Indicative Programme

Coordinated Maritime Presence (CMP) in Gulf of Guinea is EU's pilot CMP project, launched on 25 January 2021. Overall, the CMP project will enhance EU's visibility in the maritime environment and support the Unions political and strategic objectives in cooperation with regional and international partners. It will foster international law and UNCLOS and international cooperation with focus on information sharing within the maritime domain
