= Petrol piracy =

Act of Piracy relating to Petroleum

The historical symbol of piracy, the famous Jolly Roger.

Petrol piracy also sometimes called oil piracy or petro-piracy, is an act of piracy that specifically involves petroleum resources, or their transportation, consumption, and regulation. It should not be confused with the term oil war, as although both involve petroleum, petrol piracy always involves at least one of the aggressors being ship or boat-borne. Although, it may seem not as prevalent in today's modern society due to plummeting oil prices and lower attack rates, a number of specific incidents have still occurred in-addition to the fact that since the start of COVID-19 there has been an unprecedented resurgence in piracy incidents (petrol piracy-included). In contrast to traditional piracy, petroleum ships are generally targeted over merchant, as it serves as a means to fight back against 'resource control' within the region.

== List of notable maritime petrol piracy acts ==
- Maritime Jewel (2002)
  - Previously called the 'MV LIMBURG', this oil tanker suffered an explosion and corresponding fire considered to be the result of an attack.
- MV Sirius Star (2008)
  - This crude oil tanker was the largest ship to ever be attacked by pirates.
- Nave Andromeda incident (2020)
  - The oil tanker 'Nave Andromeda' was the target of a suspected hijacking, involving 7 stowaways in October 2020.
- Piracy in the Gulf of Guinea (2021)
  - The MV MOZART was boarded by pirates in January 2021, and 1 crewman was killed in the event.

== Increased activity in 2020 due to COVID-19 ==
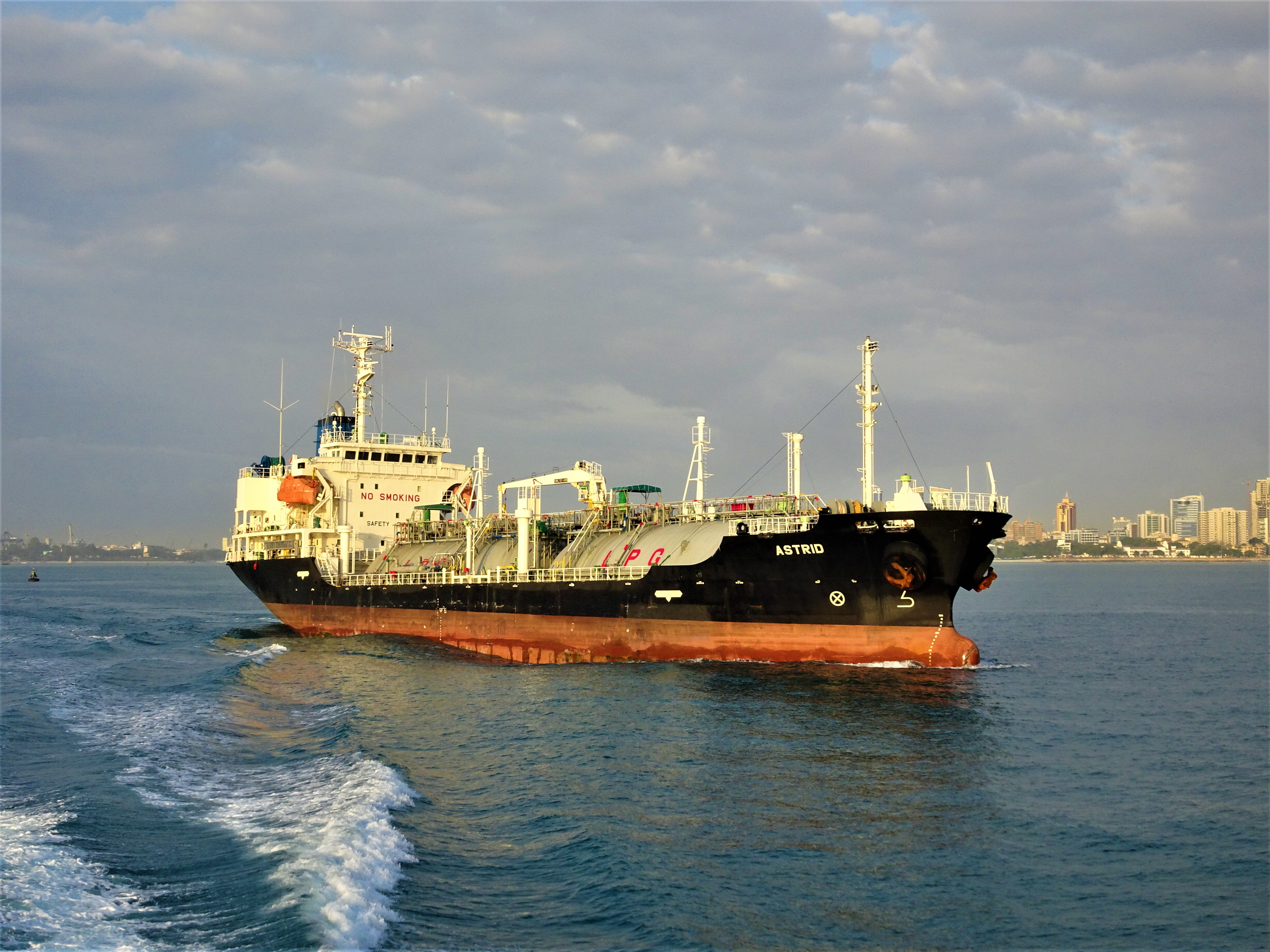
A Petroleum tanker leaving Dar es Salaam, located near the country of Somalia.

In the most recent copy of the IMB's piracy report, signs show of piracy activity doubling in areas with previously very low numbers. This is attributed due to a stronger economic downturn then usual, as a result of COVID-19. Current hot-spots include areas like the Gulf of Aden and the Western African nation of Guinea, an affluent jewel when it comes to illicit petroleum, due to its geographical positioning in relation to several sources of oil along the coast.

== See also ==
- Piracy in the 21st century
- Petrostate
- Petro-aggression
- Maritime terrorism in Southeast Asia
- Resource curse
- Petro-piracy in the Gulf of Guinea
