= List of ships attacked by Nigerian pirates =

Since 2009 a number of ships have been attacked by Nigerian pirates.

The pirates are generally believed to be ex-militant members of the Movement for the Emancipation of the Niger Delta who steal crude oil off tanker ships and sell it to buyers on the black market.

In April 2013 the African Union began funding extra security forces and increased security in the Gulf of Guinea but this has had little to no effect on piracy in the region.

Since 2011, over 30 ships have been hijacked and 100 sailors have been kidnapped, including:

== 2009 ==
Image	Flag (owner)	Name (class)	Crew (cargo)	Status	Date of attack	Coordinates
Image	Flag (owner)	Name (class)	Crew (cargo)	Status	Date of release	Ransom demanded
	France	Bourbon Leda (Oil tanker)	unknown (Crude oil)	Released	2009-01-04	unknown
	France	Bourbon Leda (Oil tanker)	unknown (Crude oil)	Released	2009-01-09	none
	Malaysia	MT Meredith (Oil tanker)	unknown (Crude oil)	Released	2009-01-21	unknown
	Malaysia	MT Meredith (Oil tanker)	unknown (Crude oil)	Released	2009-01-22	none
	Nigeria (United States)	MV Ngoni (Oil tanker)	unknown (Crude oil)	Released	2009-01-23	unknown
	Nigeria (United States)	MV Ngoni (Oil tanker)	unknown (Crude oil)	Released	2009-01-23	none
	Turkey	Ilena Mercan (Oil tanker)	unknown (Crude oil)	Released	2009-04-21	unknown
	Turkey	Ilena Mercan (Oil tanker)	unknown (Crude oil)	Released	2009-05-05	none
	Malaysia	African Prince (Oil tanker)	unknown (Crude oil)	Released	2009-11-23	unknown
	Malaysia	African Prince (Oil tanker)	unknown (Crude oil)	Released	2009-12-01	none
	Liberia (Ukraine)	Canacle Star (Oil tanker)	unknown (Crude oil)	Released	2009-11-24	unknown
	Liberia (Ukraine)	Canacle Star (Oil tanker)	unknown (Crude oil)	Released	2009-11-24	none

== 2011 ==
Image	Flag (owner)	Name (class)	Crew (cargo)	Status	Date of attack	Coordinates
Image	Flag (owner)	Name (class)	Crew (cargo)	Status	Date of release	Ransom demanded
	Cyprus (Spain)	MT Mattheos I (Oil tanker)	23 (Crude oil)	Released	2011-09-14	unknown
	Cyprus (Spain)	MT Mattheos I (Oil tanker)	23 (Crude oil)	Released	2011-09-26	none
	Marshall Islands (Russia)	MT Cape Bird (Oil tanker)	20 (Crude oil)	Released	2011-10-13	unknown
	Marshall Islands (Russia)	MT Cape Bird (Oil tanker)	20 (Crude oil)	Released	2011-10-14	none
	Bangladesh (United States)	AHST Wilbert Tide (Oil tanker)	unknown (Crude oil)	Released	2011-10-19	unknown
	Bangladesh (United States)	AHST Wilbert Tide (Oil tanker)	unknown (Crude oil)	Released	2011-10-20	none
	Malta	MT Halifax (Oil tanker)	20 (Crude oil)	Released	2011-11-01	unknown
	Malta	MT Halifax (Oil tanker)	20 (Crude oil)	Released	2011-12-01	none

== 2012 ==
Image	Flag (owner)	Name (class)	Crew (cargo)	Status	Date of attack	Coordinates
Image	Flag (owner)	Name (class)	Crew (cargo)	Status	Date of release	Ransom demanded
	Curacao	unknown (Oil tanker)	unknown (Crude oil)	Released	2012-02-29	unknown
	Curacao	unknown (Oil tanker)	unknown (Crude oil)	Released	2012-03-02	none
	Italy	unknown (Oil tanker)	unknown (Crude oil)	Released	2012-07-27	unknown
	Italy	unknown (Oil tanker)	unknown (Crude oil)	Released	2012-07-27	none
	The Netherlands	unknown (Oil tanker)	unknown (Crude oil)	Released	2012-08-04	unknown
	The Netherlands	unknown (Oil tanker)	unknown (Crude oil)	Released	2012-08-04	none
	Singapore	Abu Dhabi Star (Oil tanker)	unknown (Crude oil)	Rescued	2012-09-05	unknown
	Singapore	Abu Dhabi Star (Oil tanker)	unknown (Crude oil)	Rescued	2012-09-05	none
Pirates seized the oil tanker Abu Dhabi Star off the coast of Nigeria's largest port, Lagos. Upon seeing a Nigerian Navy vessel approaching, the pirates hopped back into their boats and made a hasty retreat.
	Ivory Coast	unknown (Oil tanker)	25 (Crude oil)	Released	2012-10-06	unknown
	Ivory Coast	unknown (Oil tanker)	25 (Crude oil)	Released	2012-10-09	none
	Russia (Luxembourg)	Bourbon Liberty 249 (Oil tanker)	unknown (Crude oil)	Released	2012-10-15	unknown
	Russia (Luxembourg)	Bourbon Liberty 249 (Oil tanker)	unknown (Crude oil)	Released	2012-11-01	none
Sea pirates took control of the Russian-owned oil vessel Bourbon Liberty 249. The pirates stole much of the ship's crude oil supply before taking 7 crew member hostage, all of whom were released 16 days after capture.
	Honduras	PM Salem (Oil tanker)	unknown (Crude oil)	Released	2012-12-13	unknown
	Honduras	PM Salem (Oil tanker)	unknown (Crude oil)	Released	2012-12-13	none
Heavily armed pirates boarded the Honduras flagged oil vessel PM Salem 25 nautical miles off the Bayelsa coastline. The ship's crew, apart from the master and security personnel, retreated to the ship's citadel while the security team opened fire. A 20 minute gun battle ensued, during which 1 security guard was killed while to other security personnel were wounded, before the pirates gave up the fight and sped off in their boats.
	Marshall Islands	SP Brussels (Oil tanker)	unknown (Crude oil)	Released	2012-12-17	unknown
	Marshall Islands	SP Brussels (Oil tanker)	unknown (Crude oil)	Released	2013-01-26	unknown
Pirates took control of the oil tanker SP Brussels 40 nautical miles off the Nigerian coast. The pirates looted the ship's safe and robbed the crew of whatever valuable they had before stealing the crude oil that the ship was transporting. 5 crew members of Indian origin were taken hostage and kept prisoner for 40 days in the Niger Delta before being released by their captors.
	Italy	Asso Ventuno (Oil tanker)	unknown (Crude oil)	Released	2012-12-23	unknown
	Italy	Asso Ventuno (Oil tanker)	unknown (Crude oil)	Released	2013-01-09	none
7 sea pirates in 2 boats boarded and seized the Italian oil vessel Asso Ventuno 40 nautical miles off the coast of Bayelsa state. After tapping into the ship's crude oil supply, 4 crew members were rounded up and taken hostage, only to be released without incident 17 days later.

== 2013 ==
Image	Flag (owner)	Name (class)	Crew (cargo)	Status	Date of attack	Coordinates
Image	Flag (owner)	Name (class)	Crew (cargo)	Status	Date of release	Ransom demanded
	Panama (Ivory Coast)	Koda Maritime (Oil tanker)	23 (Crude oil)	Released	2013-01-16	unknown
	Panama (Ivory Coast)	Koda Maritime (Oil tanker)	23 (Crude oil)	Released	2013-01-24	none
	Panama ([[|]])	Itri (Oil tanker)	16 (Crude oil)	Released	2013-01-16	unknown
	Panama ([[|]])	Itri (Oil tanker)	16 (Crude oil)	Released	2013-01-22	none
Armed gunmen boarded Panama-flagged MV ITRI during preps to deposit oil cargo at 2200 LT at Abidjan anchorage, Ivory Coast. Vessel and 16 Nigerian crew held. Master reportedly radioed the port manager to report difficulty manoeuvring following sand storm before contact lost. Port officials were informed armed men had boarded vessel. Reported 16 Jan. UPDATE: ITRI released after cargo theft. Crew unharmed. Vessel anchored off Lagos, Nigeria. Reported 22 Jan.
	Luxembourg (France)	Gascogne (Oil tanker)	unknown (Crude oil)	Released	2013-02-03	unknown
	Luxembourg (France)	Gascogne (Oil tanker)	unknown (Crude oil)	Released	2013-02-19	none
	Marshall Islands (Greece)	Pyxis Delta (Oil tanker)	unknown (Crude oil)	Released	2013-02-04	unknown
	Marshall Islands (Greece)	Pyxis Delta (Oil tanker)	unknown (Crude oil)	Released	2013-02-05	none
	United Kingdom	Esther C (Oil tanker)	unknown (Crude oil)	Released	2013-02-07	unknown
	United Kingdom	Esther C (Oil tanker)	unknown (Crude oil)	Released	2013-03-13	none
	Liberia (Malaysia)	Armada Tugas (Oil tanker)	unknown (Crude oil)	Released	2013-02-07	unknown
	Liberia (Malaysia)	Armada Tugas (Oil tanker)	unknown (Crude oil)	Released	2013-02-07	none
	St. Vincent and the Grenadines	Walvis 7 (Oil tanker)	unknown (Crude oil)	Released	2013-02-10	unknown
	St. Vincent and the Grenadines	Walvis 7 (Oil tanker)	unknown (Crude oil)	Released	2013-02-10	none
	Liberia (Indonesia)	Armada Tuah 101 (Oil tanker)	unknown (Crude oil)	Released after ransom	2013-02-17	unknown
	Liberia (Indonesia)	Armada Tuah 101 (Oil tanker)	unknown (Crude oil)	Released after ransom	2013-02-26	US$1.3 million
	Pakistan	unknown (Oil tanker)	unknown (Crude oil)	Released	2013-02-22	unknown
	Pakistan	unknown (Oil tanker)	unknown (Crude oil)	Released	2013-03-07	none
	Nigeria	Orange 7 (Fishing vessel)	unknown (fish)	Released	2013-03-02	unknown
	Nigeria	Orange 7 (Fishing vessel)	unknown (fish)	Released	2013-03-02	none
	Malaysia	Armada Tuah 22 (Oil tanker)	unknown (Crude oil)	Released	2013-03-07	unknown
	Malaysia	Armada Tuah 22 (Oil tanker)	unknown (Crude oil)	Released	2013-03-11	none
	Russia	unknown (Oil tanker)	unknown (Crude oil)	Released	2013-04-22	unknown
	Russia	unknown (Oil tanker)	unknown (Crude oil)	Released	2013-05-26	none
	India	unknown (Oil tanker)	unknown (Crude oil)	Released	2013-04-29	unknown
	India	unknown (Oil tanker)	unknown (Crude oil)	Released	2013-05-14	none
	Nigeria	unknown (Passenger boat)	unknown (Passengers)	Released	2013-05-14	unknown
	Nigeria	unknown (Passenger boat)	unknown (Passengers)	Released	2013-05-14	none
	Nigeria	MT Matrix (Oil tanker)	17 (Crude oil)	Released	2013-05-14	unknown
	Nigeria	MT Matrix (Oil tanker)	17 (Crude oil)	Released	2013-06-06	none
	France	Adour (Oil tanker)	unknown (Crude oil)	Released	2013-06-13	unknown
	France	Adour (Oil tanker)	unknown (Crude oil)	Released	2013-06-18	none
	Singapore	MDPL Continental One (Oil tanker)	unknown (Crude oil)	Released	2013-06-19	unknown
	Singapore	MDPL Continental One (Oil tanker)	unknown (Crude oil)	Released	2013-06-19	none
	Malta (Turkey)	MT Cotton (Oil tanker)	24 (Crude oil)	Released	2013-07-16	unknown
	Malta (Turkey)	MT Cotton (Oil tanker)	24 (Crude oil)	Released	2013-07-22	none
	Saint Kitts and Nevis	MT Notre (Oil tanker)	unknown (Crude oil)	Rescued	2013-08-15	unknown
	Saint Kitts and Nevis	MT Notre (Oil tanker)	unknown (Crude oil)	Rescued	2013-08-19	none
On August 15, 2013, the Saint Kitts and Nevis-flagged oil vessel MT Notre was overtaken by a group of 16 heavily armed Nigerian pirates. Before the hijackers made it on board an emergency signal was sent to the Nigerian Navy who immediately deployed several gunships to retrieve the vessel. After four days at sea the hijacked vessel was spotted by the Nigerian Navy and forced back into Nigerian waters, but, while negotiating the ship's release the pirates attempted to flee in their speedboats. The navy continued the pursuit but were fired upon by the hijackers. After a 30-minute gun battle, 12 pirates lay dead while the remaining 4 surrendered peacefully after seeing the fate of their comrades.
	Greece	unknown (Oil tanker)	15 (Crude oil)	Rescued	2013-08-28	unknown
	Greece	unknown (Oil tanker)	15 (Crude oil)	Rescued	2013-08-28	none
A Greek-owned oil carrier was hijacked by 7 Nigerian pirates off the coast of Calabar, not before a distress signal was sent out and picked up by the Nigerian Navy. Upon noticing an oncoming Nigerian Navy vessel the pirates opened fire on it. The naval gunship then returned fire and, after a short gunfight, 6 pirates were killed while 1 survivor was arrested before being treated for his injuries.
	United States	C-Retriever (Oil tanker)	unknown (Crude oil)	Released after ransom	2013-10-24	unknown
	United States	C-Retriever (Oil tanker)	unknown (Crude oil)	Released after ransom	2013-11-12	US$2 million
On October 24, 2013, the U.S. supply vessel C-Retriever was boarded by a group of heavily armed pirates while working in an oil-field near Brass, Nigeria. The pirates ransacked the ship, stealing anything of value, before taking two American citizens prisoner and sailing off into the delta. The Movement for the Emancipation of the Niger Delta claimed responsibility for the attack and stated that it would arrange for the release of the two Americans once a ransom was negotiated. For 19 days the two American citizens were kept in a makeshift prison assembled by the pirates deep within the mangrove swamps of the Niger Delta, before being released on November 12 once a $2 million ransom was paid in-full to the rebel group.
	Marshall Islands (Greece)	MT ALTHEA (Oil tanker)	18 (Crude oil)	Released	2013-12-16	unknown
	Marshall Islands (Greece)	MT ALTHEA (Oil tanker)	18 (Crude oil)	Released	2014-01-07	unknown
On December 16, 2013, the Greek oil vessel MT ALTHEA was boarded by a group of heavily armed pirates. The ship's captain and chief engineer were taken captive by the hijackers and kept prisoner in the Niger Delta for 23 days before being released on January 7, 2014.

== 2014 ==
Image	Flag (owner)	Name (class)	Crew (cargo)	Status	Date of attack	Coordinates
Image	Flag (owner)	Name (class)	Crew (cargo)	Status	Date of release	Ransom demanded
	Singapore	MT Super League (Oil tanker)	unknown (Crude oil)	Released	2014-01-02	unknown
	Singapore	MT Super League (Oil tanker)	unknown (Crude oil)	Released	2014-01-10	none
The Singapore-flagged oil vessel MT Super League was boarded by a group of armed Nigerian pirates 55 nautical miles off the coast of Equatorial Guinea. The ship's cargo of crude oil was siphoned out into various barges over a period of 8 days before the ship and its crew were released by their hijackers without incident.
	Liberia (Equatorial Guinea)	MV San Miguel (Oil tanker)	20 (Crude oil)	Rescued	2014-01-03	unknown
	Liberia (Equatorial Guinea)	MV San Miguel (Oil tanker)	20 (Crude oil)	Rescued	2014-01-31	none
On January 3, 2014 the Liberian flagged MV San Miguel was hijacked approximately 20 miles off the coast of Bata, Equatorial Guinea. The ship was then taken to a location off the coast of Kribi, Cameroon where the pirates then ransacked the ship, stealing whatever valuables they could get their hands on, before taking 3 of the crew members hostage. After being held prisoner for 26 days, soldiers of the Joint Task Force managed to locate the pirate's camp where they were being held. 5 of the supposed hijackers were arrested while the others managed to slip away unnoticed into the delta.
	Liberia (Greece)	MT Kerala (Oil tanker)	unknown (Crude oil)	Released	2014-01-18	unknown
	Liberia (Greece)	MT Kerala (Oil tanker)	unknown (Crude oil)	Released	2014-01-26	none
In the early hours of January 18, 2014 the Liberian-flagged oil vessel MT Kerala departed from the port of Luanda, Angola without any notice. As time went on, the owners of the MT Kerala began to worry and suspected that it may have been hijacked. On January 26, 8 days after being reported missing, the oil vessel was located nearly 3,000km north off the coast of Warri, Nigeria. The 27 man crew reported that the vessel had been hijacked and robbed of its 13,000 metric tons of refined petroleum. Although officially declared a "hijacking" both Angolan and Nigerian authorities suspect that there may have been some sort of an "inside job" due to conflicting reports of the events that transpired, as well as numerous reports of an unidentifiable vessel heading southwards in the days leading up to the supposed hijacking.
	Nigeria	Prince Joseph 1 (Platform supply vessel)	unknown (supplies)	Released	2014-03-03	unknown
	Nigeria	Prince Joseph 1 (Platform supply vessel)	unknown (supplies)	Released	2014-03-06	none
The Nigerian platform-supply vessel Prince Joseph 1 was hijacked by a group of armed pirates. Upon discovering that the vessel contained no oil, the pirates instead took 3 crew members hostage and fled into the Niger Delta. All 3 crew members were released 3 days later without incident.
	Marshall Islands	SP Brussels (Oil tanker)	17 (Crude oil)	Rescued	2014-05-11	unknown
	Marshall Islands	SP Brussels (Oil tanker)	17 (Crude oil)	Rescued	2014-05-12	none
The oil tanker SP Brussels was hijacked 120 nautical miles off the coast of Lagos, en route from Port Harcourt. Upon sighting the pirates, 15 of the ship's 17 crew members immediately retreated to the ship's citadel. 6 pirates boarded the vessel while the other 2 pirates manned the speed boats. In an exchange of gunfire between the 6 pirates and the 2 security personnel assigned to the ship 2 crew members, the ship's captain and an Indian sailor, were shot dead before the pirates managed to disarm the 2 police officers and take possession of the ship. Upon searching the ship, the pirates found that it was devoid of human life and immediately discovered the entire 15 man crew huddled together in the citadel. The pirates immediately set sail to go offload the ship's cargo, but unfortunately, the Nigerian Navy had gotten wind of the hijacking and immediately gave pursuit. 2 Nigerian Navy vessels cut-off the pirates escape route and a gun duel ensued. In the end, 2 pirates were shot dead while the other 6 were arrested.
	Kiribati (Singapore)	MT Hai Soon 6 (Oil tanker)	21 (Crude oil)	Released	2014-07-26	unknown
	Kiribati (Singapore)	MT Hai Soon 6 (Oil tanker)	21 (Crude oil)	Released	2014-08-04	none
The Kiribati-flagged vessel MT Hai Soon 6 was boarded and hijacked by a group of 10 heavily armed pirates at 11:40PM UTC approximately 46 nautical miles off the coast of Anloga, Ghana. After successfully siphoning all the ship's crude oil into barges, the pirates fled the scene in speedboats and released the entire 21 man crew without incident.
	Marshall Islands ([[|]])	SP Boston (Oil tanker)	unknown (Crude oil)	Released	2014-08-27	unknown
	Marshall Islands ([[|]])	SP Boston (Oil tanker)	unknown (Crude oil)	Released	2014-08-27	none
Drifting Marshall Islands-flagged product tanker, SP Boston, boarded by 12 armed pirates at 2115 UTC in position 04:43.2N - 003.30.2W, around 46nm SE of Abidjan, Ivory Coast. Pirates armed with guns took all crew hostage, stole ship’s cash and property, crew cash, personal belongings and destroyed navigation equipment before escaping. No injuries to crew.
	Nigeria	unknown (Platform supply vessel)	unknown (supplies)	Captain and chief engineer currently held hostage	2014-10-23	unknown
	Italy	unknown (Barge)	6 (Crude oil)	6 oil workers currently held hostage	2014-10-25	unknown
A Nigerian police gunboat escorting an oil barge owned by Eni came under fire from a group of pirates lying in wait on the Barbara River near Nembe. All 3 police officers were killed before being stripped of their rifles, uniforms, and gunboat. The pirates then took the 6 man oil crew hostage before fleeing the scene in both boats.
	Nigeria	unknown (Gunboat)	3 (none)	All 3 soldiers killed by pirates	2014-12-21	unknown
	Nigeria	unknown (Gunboat)	3 (none)	All 3 soldiers killed by pirates	2014-12-21	
3 Nigerian military Joint Task Force soldiers who had been escorting an Agip carrier vessel were ambushed along the Barbara River, where a similar attack occurred less than 2 months earlier. All 3 soldiers were shot by their attackers before having their corpses tossed into the water and their gunboat hijacked. It is suspected that pirates are currently stockpiling weapons for the upcoming 2015 elections.

== 2015 ==
Image	Flag (owner)	Name (class)	Crew (cargo)	Status	Date of attack	Coordinates
Image	Flag (owner)	Name (class)	Crew (cargo)	Status	Date of release	Ransom demanded
	Nigeria	MT Mariam (Oil tanker)	9 (Crude oil)	8 pirates arrested	2015-01-17	unknown
	Nigeria	MT Mariam (Oil tanker)	9 (Crude oil)	8 pirates arrested	2015-01-17	none
8 armed pirates boarded the Nigerian oil tanker MT Mariam in the early hours of January 17, 2015. Before being taken captive the ship's owners managed to alert the Ghanaian Navy. While the pirates were preoccupied with siphoning the crude oil into a barge, a Ghanaian Navy vessel swooped in and managed to arrest all 8 pirates without resistance.
	Malta (Greece)	Kalamos (Oil tanker)	23 (Crude oil)	3 crew members currently held hostage	2015-02-03	unknown
	Malta (Greece)	Kalamos (Oil tanker)	23 (Crude oil)	3 crew members currently held hostage		none
Dozens of armed pirates boarded the Malta-flagged Kalamos while it was anchored off the coast of southeastern Nigeria. After stealing all the crude oil they could haul-off, 3 crew members were taken prisoner and the ship's deputy commander was summarily executed.
	France	unknown (speedboat)	3 (none)	Released	2015-04-08	unknown
	France	unknown (speedboat)	3 (none)	Released	2015-05-08	none
3 French oil workers working for the oil company Bourbon were kidnapped after their Surfer 1440 speedboat was boarded by a group of armed pirates. After being kept prisoner in the Niger Delta for nearly a month, the 3 men were released without incident and were allowed to return to Port Harcourt.
	Malaysia	MT Imas (Oil tanker)	unknown (Crude oil)	10 pirates arrested	2015-04-20	unknown
	Malaysia	MT Imas (Oil tanker)	unknown (Crude oil)	10 pirates arrested	2015-04-20	none
10 armed pirates in 2 speedboats boarded the Malaysian oil vessel MT Imas 25 nautical miles off the coast of Lagos. Security personnel operating the vessel radioed in a distress call which was picked up by the Nigerian Navy, who sent a dispatch to intercept the hijackers. After a brief exchange of gunfire, all 10 pirates surrendered peacefully without any injuries being reported.
	Nigeria	Nembe Waterfront Base (Military base)	()	4 soldiers and 1 police officer killed	2015-08-07	unknown
	Nigeria	Nembe Waterfront Base (Military base)	()	4 soldiers and 1 police officer killed	2015-08-07	
On August 7, 2015 four speedboats filled with heavily armed sea pirates attacked the Joint Task Force's Nembe Waterfront Base, located along the Brass River, before engaging a group of defending Nigerian soldiers in a bloody firefight. The four Nigerian soldiers stationed at the base were caught off guard and were easily gunned down by their attackers along with a Nigerian police officer who happened to be at the wrong place at the wrong time. The group of pirates then stormed the undefended base and managed to steal two high-powered machine guns along with a cache of weapons consisting mainly of single-shot rifles, shotguns, and handguns before making their escape back into the Niger Delta. The military high-command in Abuja made an effort to locate the rebels and recapture their stolen weaponry but came up empty handed in their attempts.
	Nigeria	MT Askja (Oil tanker)	8 (Crude oil)	8 pirates arrested	2015-09-30	unknown
	Nigeria	MT Askja (Oil tanker)	8 (Crude oil)	8 pirates arrested	2015-09-30	none
The Nigerian Navy raided and seized the oil vessel MT Askja on September 30 after it was suspected to be transporting a cargo of stolen crude oil. The vessel was anchored in the Forçados River estuary while being loaded with a cargo of stolen crude oil that was likely in transit to an illegal oil refinery located somewhere in the Niger Delta, before the Joint Task Force launched a surprise raid on the pirate's oil tanker, likely a hijacked commercial vessel re-commissioned to transport stolen goods.
	Comoros (Russia)	Reefer Solarte (Cargo ship)	19 (unknown)	Released	2015-10-19	unknown
	Comoros (Russia)	Reefer Solarte (Cargo ship)	19 (unknown)	Released	2015-10-20	Ransom paid
The Comoros-flagged cargo ship Reefer Solarte was hijacked on the evening of October 19, 2015 by a group of armed pirates off the coast of Port Harcourt. The armed pirates attacked the vessel, boarded the ship without much resistance, and proceeded to ransack the ship for whatever valuables they could get their hands on. They stole the ship's cash, destroyed electronic equipment, and kidnapped 4 sailors, 2 Lithuanians and 2 Ukrainians, before making their escape. It is speculated that the armed gang of pirates was forced to widen their range of operations after the Nigerian Navy increased patrols in the Bonny River region of the Niger Delta in April 2015, leading to the arrest of 10 armed pirates during a hijacking 6 months earlier. After weeks of negotiating, the Russian company that owned the ship paid the ransom demanded by the pirates in exchange for the 4 kidnapped sailors. All 4 sailors were released in good health by their captors on November 16 and are scheduled to be sent to their countries of origin after giving witness evidences.
	Nigeria	Afikpo, Nigeria ()	()	1 Police Inspector killed, 2 civilians abducted	2015-11-06	unknown
	Nigeria	Afikpo, Nigeria ()	()	1 Police Inspector killed, 2 civilians abducted	2015-11-06	
On November 6, 2015 at approximately 8:45am the town of Afikpo in Ebonyi State was invaded by a group of heavily armed pirates in speed boats. The pirates entered the community via Ndibe beach, located along a small tributary of the Cross River, mounted atop speedboats and armed with machine guns and high-caliber weapons. The police stationed in Afikpo became quickly overwhelmed by the violent onslaught unleashed by the invading pirates, who then proceeded to blow up a police vehicle with dynamite, ransacked numerous houses/businesses, and burned down several structures along with about 10 motorcycles. When news of the attack reached Abakaliki the state Commissioner of Police, Peace Abdallah, led a combined force of Nigerian Army soldiers and state police officers to Afikpo in an attempt to drive off the hoard of pirates. The pirates opened fire once they had spotted Nigerian government forces but were met with an equally impressive show of force which then erupted into a full-blown gunfight. The pirates were forced to retreat while under heavy fire from the Nigerian Army but managed to kill a Nigerian Police Inspector and abduct 2 civilians during the melee before fleeing, without suffering a single casualty, in their speedboats via the same waterway they had used to enter the city.
	Cyprus (Poland)	Szafir (Cargo ship)	16 (unknown)	Released	2015-11-27	unknown
	Cyprus (Poland)	Szafir (Cargo ship)	16 (unknown)	Released	2015-12-08	Ransom paid
On November 27, 2015 the Cyprus-flagged cargo vessel Szafir was boarded by a group of heavily armed pirates 30 nautical miles off the Nigerian coast. The pirates opened fire from the two speed boats they were sailing in and forced the cargo ship to drop anchor before being boarded and looted. After the pirates looted the ship of any cash and valuables, they took the ship's captain and 4 Polish sailors hostage before sailing back into the Niger Delta. The pirates soon got into contact with Polish Foreign Minister Witold Waszczykowski and managed to negotiate an undisclosed ransom that was to be paid in-full to the hijackers in return for the release of the 5 Polish sailors. Polish authorities paid the ransom demanded by the abductors for the release of all 5 sailors. They were released by their abductors on December 8 in healthy condition; all were set to be returned to Poland.

== 2016 ==
Image	Flag (owner)	Name (class)	Crew (cargo)	Status	Date of attack	Coordinates
Image	Flag (owner)	Name (class)	Crew (cargo)	Status	Date of release	Ransom demanded
	Greece	MV Leon Dias (Chemical tanker)	unknown (Crude oil)	5 crew members currently held hostage	2016-01-29	unknown
The Greek chemical tanker MV Leon Davis was hijacked by pirates off the Nigerian coast. The pirates took control of the vessel and diverted it to the port of Cotonou, Benin where the hijackers then looted the ship of all its valuables before severely beating the ship's chief officer. The chief officer along with 4 other crew members are currently being held prisoner in an unknown location somewhere in Benin.
	Bulgaria	unknown (Oil tanker)	unknown (Crude oil)	Hijacked	2016-02-02	unknown
A Bulgarian oil vessel was hijacked by pirates 160 kilometers off Nigeria's Bakassi Peninsula. Reports indicate that the pirates attacked the ship using two speedboats before then boarding the ship and locking the entire crew in the mess room. An ultimatum was issued by the pirates stating that if Nnamdi Kanu, leading member of the Indigenous People of Biafra (IPOB), is not released from jail within 31 days they will blow up the ship along with its crew. It is unknown who these pirates are working on behalf of but it is speculated that they are Niger Delta militants fighting in support of the pro-Biafra movement, that is once again taking Igboland and much of southeastern Nigeria by storm.
	Luxembourg (France)	Bourbon Liberty 251 (Oil tanker)	12 (Crude oil)	2 crew members taken prisoner	2016-02-16	unknown
	Luxembourg (France)	Bourbon Liberty 251 (Oil tanker)	12 (Crude oil)	2 crew members taken prisoner	2016-02-16	
On February 16, 2016 6 heavily armed Nigerian pirates boarded the French owned oil vessel Bourbon Liberty 251 55 nautical miles off the Nigerian coast. The pirates managed to capture the ship's master, a Russian citizen, along with a Nigerian sailor while the other 10 crew members managed to lock themselves in the engine room. As the pirates looted the ship and damaged its communications, the 10 crew members managed to send out a distress signal to the Nigerian Navy who immediately dispatched a vessel to intercept the ship. When the pirates spotted the naval vessel approaching on the horizon they took the 2 captured crew members hostage and fled back towards the Niger Delta. Nigerian authorities are currently attempting to contact the pirates in order to negotiate some sort of deal in order to release the 2 captured crewmen.
	Panama (Greece)	Madonna 1 (Oil tanker)	21 (Crude oil)	Released	2016-03-11	unknown
	Panama (Greece)	Madonna 1 (Oil tanker)	21 (Crude oil)	Released	2016-03-30	
	Turkey	M/T Puli (Cargo ship)	unknown (Chemical fuel)	Released	2016-04-11	unknown
	Turkey	M/T Puli (Cargo ship)	unknown (Chemical fuel)	Released	2016-04-26	unknown
	Nigeria	unknown (Platform supply vessel)	unknown (supplies)	2 crew members taken prisoner	2016-04-20	unknown
	Nigeria	unknown (Platform supply vessel)	unknown (supplies)	2 crew members taken prisoner	2016-04-20	

== 2021 ==
Image	Flag (owner)	Name (class)	Crew (cargo)	Status	Date of attack	Coordinates
Image	Flag (owner)	Name (class)	Crew (cargo)	Status	Date of release	Ransom demanded
	Liberia (Turkey)	MV Mozart (Cargo ship)	19 (unknown)	released (1 crew member killed)	2021-01-23	unknown
	Liberia (Turkey)	MV Mozart (Cargo ship)	19 (unknown)	released (1 crew member killed)	2021-02-13	unknown
