= Piracy in the Gulf of Guinea =

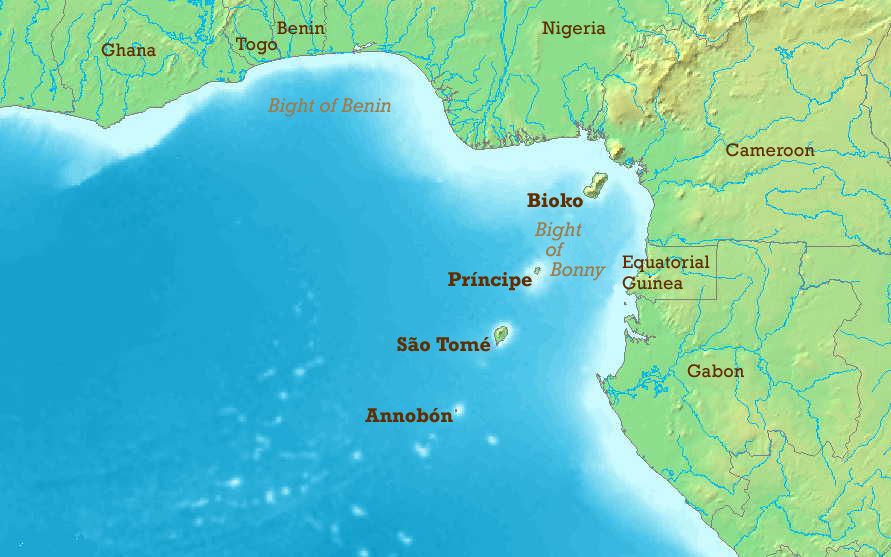
The Gulf of Guinea

Piracy in the Gulf of Guinea affects a number of countries in West Africa as well as the wider international community. By 2011, it had become an issue of global concern. Pirates in the Gulf of Guinea are often part of heavily armed criminal enterprises, who employ violent methods to steal oil cargo. In 2012, the International Maritime Bureau (IMB), Oceans Beyond Piracy and the Maritime Piracy Humanitarian Response Program reported that the number of vessels attacks by West African pirates had reached a world high, with 966 seafarers attacked during the year. According to the Control Risks Group, pirate attacks in the Gulf of Guinea had by mid-November 2013 maintained a steady level of around 100 attempted hijackings in the year, a close second behind the Strait of Malacca in Southeast Asia.

Piracy in the Gulf of Guinea continues to be a concern to significantly affect the shipping industry, with over 80% of crew kidnappings occurring there, as reported by the IMB in late 2019. Officials report Nigerian pirate gangs in the Gulf of Guinea shifting, in 2019, from cargo theft to kidnapping seafaring crews in order to extort ransom from ship owners. With piracy surging again in the 2020s, governments in the region generally highlight that the fight against piracy requires a broad understanding of maritime security throughout the Gulf of Guinea.

== Scope of the problem ==
The Gulf of Guinea stretches from Senegal to Angola, covering over 6,000 km of coast line. It comprises 20 coastal states, islands and landlocked states and forms two regions: West Africa and Central Africa. The sea basin is of geo-political and geo-economic importance for the transport of goods to and from central and southern Africa. Additionally, it is a choke point for the African energy trade, with intensive oil extraction in Nigeria's Niger Delta.

The term 'piracy' is widely used in the media and in official reports to generally refer to maritime crime in the region, but this is formally incorrect, as the United Nations Convention on the Law of the Sea defines piracy as an act conducted on the high seas i.e. beyond territorial waters. Similar criminal activities that take place within territorial waters are not defined as acts of piracy following this definition in international law.

Reports of attempted or actual attacks considered acts of piracy, differ wildly. This has added to a general confusion with regards to understanding the scope of the problem, fueled significantly by the varied use of the term piracy itself, the uncoordinated and heterogeneous sources of information drawn from to prepare reports and the different stakeholders' interests in portraying the problem one way or another.

Even though piracy in the region is not a new phenomenon, it has widely changed in the new century, with regards both to the typology and the number of attacks carried out. In the past, the vast majority of incidents could be categorized as simple maritime robbery: individual sailors, usually carrying cash, were often targeted for robbery on shore, and attacked when ships were at port or transferring cargo close to shore. However, since the early 2010s, attacks have started to differ from this profile: operations have become more sophisticated and organised. To facilitate successful operation, the pirates now draw on extensive piracy networks to gain access to security and economic resources. This includes government officials, businesspeople, armed groups, and transnational mafia. Incursions have been more serious and aimed at directly acquired cargos containing refined petroleum, as the region has increasingly been marred by illegal oil-bunkering. According to a European Parliament report, this was due to the discovery of large amounts of offshore hydrocarbon, from which only the central government, local elites, and oil companies have actually profited. Consequently, some of those excluded from welfare have turned to such illegal maritime activity, in the form of 'petro-piracy'.

By 2010, 45 and by 2011 64 incidents were reported to the UN International Maritime Organization. However, many events go unreported. Piracy acts interfere with the legitimate trading interests of the affected countries that include Benin, Togo, Côte d'Ivoire, Ghana, Nigeria, and the Democratic Republic of Congo. As an example, trade of Benin's major port, the Port of Cotonou, was reported in 2012 to have dropped by 70 percent. The cost of piracy in the Gulf of Guinea due to stolen goods, security, and insurance has been estimated to be about $2 billion. Navies and law enforcement agencies trying to tackle problems with piracy in the Gulf of Guinea have to conduct a thorough analysis of different types of attacks.

As of 2014, pirate attacks in West Africa mainly occur in territorial waters, terminals and harbours rather than in the high seas. This incident pattern has hindered intervention by international naval forces. Pirates in the region operate a well-funded criminal industry, which includes established supply networks. They are often part of heavily armed and sophisticated criminal enterprises, who increasingly use motherships to launch their attacks. The local pirates' overall aim is to steal oil cargo. As such, they do not attach much importance to holding vessels for ransom. Additionally, pirates in the Gulf of Guinea are especially noted for their violent modus operandi, which frequently involves the kidnapping, torture and shooting of crewmen. The increasingly violent methods used by these groups is believed to be part of a conscious "business model" adopted by them, in which violence and intimidation plays a major role.

According to the 2018 Oceans Beyond Piracy report, covering the year 2017, the number of seafarers affected by piracy and armed robbery in the Gulf of Guinea has decreased slightly compared to 2016. In total 1,726 seafarers were affected by piracy and armed robbery in 2017 in West African waters, compared to the 1,921 the year before. While 880 failed attacks or boarding occurred, 21 episodes of kidnapping took place and 100 seafarers were taken hostages. In total, there were 97 piracy and robbery incidents involving weapons, 13 of those with guns and 2 with heavy machine guns. The total estimated cost in the area due to stolen goods, contracted maritime security, insurance has been $818.1 million.

The International Maritime Bureau said, in October 2019, that the Gulf of Guinea accounted for over 80% of crew kidnappings by pirates, then, later, that 130 seafarers were kidnapped in 22 separate incidents in 2020, surpassing the 2019 record of 121 kidnappings.

Despite a decline in reported piracy incidents since the early 2020s, the Gulf of Guinea remained affected by maritime insecurity. Maritime security organizations continue to report kidnappings for ransom and armed robbery incidents in the region. Incidents of kidnapping for ransom continued to be reported in 2025 and 2026. In May 2025, armed pirates boarded a cargo ship travelling between Cameroon and the Democratic Republic of the Congo, abducting a crew member while the remaining crew sheltered in the vessel's citadel.

A vessel hijacking that occurred between Nigeria and São Tomé and Príncipe was one of 12 piracy-related incidents reported in the Gulf of Guinea during the first half of the year. Maritime security analysts reported an increase in kidnappings for ransom at sea during the same period. According to maritime security researcher Tayo Akinpelumi, anti-piracy measures in the Bight of Biafra contributed to changes in pirate tactics, with groups increasingly targeting government officials and other high-value individuals. Akinpelumi stated that such attacks were typically carried out at night by groups of approximately ten armed pirates using fast boats and were often completed within minutes. He also estimated that pirates collected approximately US$400,000 in ransom payments in Nigeria between July 2022 and June 2023. In December 2025, the Portuguese-flagged LPG carrier CGAS Saturn was boarded by pirates while sailing toward Malabo, Equatorial Guinea. The attack occurred about 93 km (50 nautical miles) offshore and resulted in the kidnapping of nine crew members and the injury of another. On January 10 2026, armed attackers abducted nine crew members from the fishing vessel IB Fish 7 in Gabonese waters. In February 2026, gunmen attacked and robbed fishing boats off the coast of Ghana.

== Root causes of piracy in the Gulf of Guinea ==
A combination of root causes can be attributed to the pervasive presence of piracy in the Gulf of Guinea, most of which display considerable overlap. Overall, research seems to indicate that when speaking of piracy, it is important not to focus on one single solution, and instead approach the battle from a multi-layered perspective, solving multiple issues with a combination of national, regional, and international efforts. The following section breaks down some of the identified root causes for the pervasiveness of piracy in the region.

=== Corruption ===
Findings from Nigeria have indicated corruption as a major cause of piracy, typically attributed to the weak legal and jurisdictional systems, law enforcement and the security apparatus of the nation. This lack of development is attributed to and identified in many of the Gulf of Guinea states.

Corruption represents a threat to democracy when powerful individuals or organizations, particularly those linked to the military and security sectors, utilize their positions to serve their own interests at the expense of the integrity of other persons, authorities, and institutions in charge of protecting the properties and assets within the nation. These pervasive practices also manifest in matters of the sea, as evidenced from the Nigerian navy, who have routinely engaged in oil bunkering, while public officials have also reportedly benefited from piracy in a multitude of ways, including engaging in corrupt practices that arise opportunistically when producing and exporting oil in the Niger Delta, resulting in the disappearance billions of dollars into overseas bank accounts of corrupt public officials and politicians. The challenges in studying the association between corruption and piracy have been in finding the clear connections between corrupt officials and pirates, and in revealing whether piracy works primarily as ad hoc, short-term relationships between pirates, powerful organizations and corrupt public officials, or if it is deeply entrenched in the wider governmental structures.

=== Illegal, Unreported and Unregulated (IUU) Fishing ===
A state's incapability to maintain control over its own territorial waters can lead to illegal, unreported and unregulated (IUU) fishing, which marginalises local fishermen who may in turn resort to criminal activity, including piracy (see also youth unemployment below).

According to the Food and Agriculture and Agriculture Organization, Illegal fishing is which is that conducted 'by national or foreign vessels in waters under the jurisdiction of a state, without the permission of that state, or in contravention of its laws and regulations', and it also includes vessels fishing in breach of other national and international laws or obligations, including in the high seas.

In Somalia, after the collapse of its government institutions in the early 1990s, foreign commercial fishing vessels had begun fishing off the Somali coastline, invading its territorial waters and EEZ and catching over three times as much fish stock as Somali fishermen could, a venture that has proven to be a generously profitable alternative to legal fishing (IUU valued somewhere between "$15.5 and $36.4 billion annually and accounts for 20 to 50% of the global catch.", according to Stimson center). This damages ecosystems and local communities alike and, as shown in Somalia, causes economic grievances that drive many Somalis into the ranks of Piracy organizations. This way, fishermen stand to earn several thousand US dollars from a single pirate attack, a substantially higher amount than would otherwise be possible by toiling hard for months in the legal economy.

=== Electoral Uncertainty and political violence ===
The very institution of elections has been related to an increase in political violence (particularly homicides), as government officials worry about keeping their power, and the fragile political structures may fail to protect their interests. When the stakes are high, violence is produced, notably and overwhelmingly by weaker incumbents, while more powerful ones are more likely to resort to non-violent methods, such as manipulation. Terrorist attacks have also been reported to peak around election time, particularly in dictatorships, and in democracies with lower levels of electoral permissiveness.

By extrapolating political violence and piracy and relating it to the electoral process in weakened states, we see these two phenomena share multiple similarities. Elections threaten to disrupt the already established deals between pirates and the incumbent authorities. Hence, during elections, especially highly competitive ones, there is an increase in piratical activity. This activity signals two conditions:

- Due to the uncertainty caused by a possible change in regime, there is an increased incentive to engage in piracy before the instability caused by the new incumbents settles in, possibly disrupting existing relationships.
- Pirates displaying their influence to local elites, whose support they also need in order to stabilize the environments in which these pirates operate.

Additionally, opportunities for piracy also rise in accordance with the strength of the political institutions neighbouring the attack (weaker institutions permitting a higher frequency of attacks), as piracy tends to thrive in environments in which the rule of law is weakened, corruption is abundant and governance is weak, as also supported by the higher frequency of attacks occurring further from the nearest capital with strong governance. As such, a goal for the Gulf of Guinea is to pursue a tight adherence to the rule of law and good governance, not only at a national level but at a regional level, since local efforts to tackle piracy are hardly enough when the overall regional governance is substandard.

=== African Youth and Youth Unemployment ===
Youth unemployment is an identified root cause of piracy in the Gulf of Guinea, a link that is particularly accentuated when linking African youth unemployment to piracy in Nigeria. As prime victims of unemployment and marginalization, this subsector of society is made more likely to resort to criminality, such as piracy and oil theft, in order to make a living. The Nigerian state particularly offers the perfect conditions for young Nigerians to feel aggrieved and organize: Seeing their government receive money from the proceeds of the sale of oil, while most people are excluded from participating in this sector, creates the perfect storm for conflicts and hostile behaviour, and ultimately lead these youths to become militants and engage in piracy.

While the adherence of Nigerian youth to piracy as having a spillover effect in the wider region of the Gulf of Guinea remains contested, research from Somalia indicates that state-building alone is not enough, and must be paired along with tackling youth unemployment, income inequality and environmental degradation, in order to combat the wider growth of piracy in the Gulf of Guinea.

It is not enough to tackle piracy as it stands, but it is equally necessary to minimise the incentives for individuals to join piracy in the first place. Somali fishermen, seeing their waters increasingly overfished (also see: Illegal, Unreported and Unregulated fishing above) by foreign industrial vessels their small embarkations cannot compete with, had become alienated from the 'legal economy'. This, added to the dumping of toxic materials in the water, further reduces the existing stock, damaging the fishermen's income and worsening their access to the economy. Seduced by the vast gains to be made for each successful attack, it becomes easier to engage in piracy, and a whole industry (backed by financiers and merchants who rely on these disenfranchised fishermen to prop up) is established as these illegal endeavours become increasingly more justifiable whenever successful attacks occur. Conversely, as economic opportunities increase, it becomes harder to justify risking capture and incarceration by authorities versus the income from working in the legal economy.

Large economic gains can be made from piracy versus the small or null to be made in the legal economy. Pirates face a low likelihood of getting caught and punished due to weak government institutions. Moreover, there is an expanding pool of recruits as the number of successful piracy incidents increase and incentivise further piracy attempts.

While piracy in Somalia now seems to be reducing in numbers, in no small part due to improved security aboard ships and overall awareness, piracy in the Gulf of Guinea is nonetheless on the rise, and hence the lessons from the Somalian experiment may prove increasingly valuable as a case study. Piracy is also rising in complexity, evolving from simple armed robberies to planned and violent assaults on oil tankers, further adding to the urgency in tackling these issues.

=== Governmental Structuring ===
The structural characteristics of governmental institutions also have a significant impact on the prevalence of piratical activity, as state weakness is represented as the most common explanation for maritime piracy, despite disagreements as to exactly at what level of governance this weakness is most relevant to piracy. Regional analyses have shown that fiscal decentralization (spreading of control of finances across a network, as opposed to having the control focused on one lone entity within) at a national level lowers the number of piratical incidents, as regions have larger stakes in the revenue streams that typically arise from peaceful settings, while a political decentralisation (distribution of institutional power across several actors within a network) analysis indicates that bigger governmental institutions at the lower tiers of governance seem to foster an increase in piracy incidents, due to reduced competition among local jurisdictions. When bottom line institutions are smaller, however, more institutions can flourish and inter-judicial competition becomes, in itself, a deterrent to piracy. Larger autonomy at a regional level and in bottom tier elections reduce piracy, as local officials gain enough power to take ownership of their law enforcement policies.

Research indicates that the fragility of the state, when allied to a lack of economic opportunities are factors that increase piracy. Weak states also lack a combination of coastal security personnel, run ineffective courts and house corrupt elites which, when allied to substantial inequality and unemployment, cause considerable grievance in the population and facilitate the creation of sanctuaries for criminal activity.

=== Sea Blindness ===
Sea blindness as a concept is inherent to the novelty that is the study of Maritime security and refers to a generalised 'neglect' of the importance of the sea, which also extends to the political and scholarly class. Sea blindness manifests in a multitude of ways, from the NATO countries being guilty of inattention in modernizing their navy, to the general populations of the UK and Australia being largely ignorant as to their regional dependence on the sea, to the UK government's substantial 'need for security, vulnerability to interruption of supply, and a weakened naval force structure'.

This phenomenon, while not a direct cause for the rise of piracy, indicates a broader overlook of the importance of sea matters at a global scale, from academics to policymakers, which in turn allows piracy and other maritime crimes such as environmental degradation and fishery crimes to flourish largely unbridled. Maritime security has become a core issue among major global security actors, and yet the scholarly fields of International Relations and security studies have scarcely studied it, as the bulk of the literature tends to only focus on such issues in relation to the study of precise geographic hot spots or during the study of precise threats such as piracy, organized crime in West Africa and human trafficking in the Mediterranean. Related issues, such as fishery crimes and environmental crimes rarely go explored, as are the underlying connections between these themes.

== Statistics ==
This section provides a detailed account of the number and kind of attacks occurred in the Gulf of Guinea in the last years. This is done by resorting to the IMB's annual reports, in particular those ranging in the ten-year span between 2009 and 2018. These reports are the most detailed and complete source of piracy related facts, and provide a vast amount of information. However, IMB relies on ship-owners' willingness to report piracy incidents, and needs the shipping industry to be comfortable to do so. As IMB itself admitted, this is not always the case. In fact, they may lack the willingness or simply the technical ability to do so, especially in the case of very small boats. This results in unreported acts of piracy, with some attacks falling outside the official statistics. Below, two tables list the actual and attempted attacks for the past ten years, where the numbers are all drawn from the same source for consistency purposes.

Actual attacks
Year	Benin	Cameroon	Gambia	Ghana	Nigeria	Togo	TOTAL
2009	1	2	-	3	22	-	28
2010	-	4	-	-	13	-	17
2011	18	-	-	2	7	-	27
2012	2	1	-	2	17	6	28
2013	-	-	2	1	15	3	21
2014	-	1	1	4	8	-	14
2015	-	1	-	2	9	-	12
2016	1	-	-	3	18	1	23
2017	-	-	-	1	20	-	21
2018	5	6	-	9	30	-	50
2019	2						2
2020							22

Attempted attacks
Year	Benin	Cameroon	Gambia	Ghana	Nigeria	Togo
2009	0	1	-	-	6	2
2010	-	1	-	-	6	-
2011	2	-	-	-	3	6
2012	-	-	-	-	10	9
2013	-	-	-	-	3	3
2014	-	-	-	-	3	2
2015	-	-	-	-	5	-
2016	-	-	-	-	9	-
2017	-	-	-	-	13	-
2018	-	1	-	1	18	1

== Regional response ==
Although several policy initiatives and legal reforms have been undertaken to combat piracy in the region, the question remains as to the efficiency of current arrangements. Only a few collective responses have been forthcoming to prevent or effectively eliminate the threat. Above all, the strategic plan to combat piracy has been inadequate in acknowledging fully the causes contributing to piracy. Traditionally, the principal means to combat piracy has been through military intervention. However, the coastal states in the Gulf of Guinea have limited maritime capacity and restrained capabilities to handle piracy and other threats at sea.

=== Operation Prosperity ===
'Operation Prosperity' was an initiative launched by Nigeria and Benin in 2011 to ensure a secure maritime environment. The project was initially supposed to last for a period of six months, and was extended for another six months. The deal between the two countries foresaw that the Nigerian navy would provide the vessels and most of the logistics and human resources for the operation, while the Benin navy would open its waters for Nigerian naval vessels to patrol. Between the end of 2011 and the start of 2012, the area saw a reduction of attempted and actual attacks, thanks to the continuous presence of military forces in the maritime domain, and the two navies' information and intelligence sharing. In addition to technical collaboration, the Benin navy also benefitted from training with its Nigerian counterpart.

=== Maritime Trade Information Sharing Centre Gulf of Guinea ===
Another interesting countermeasure is the launch of the Maritime Trade Information Sharing Centre Gulf of Guinea (MTISC-GOG). As reported by RDDC, this 'was initiated mainly by the industry as a result of the lack of involvement by regional states in maritime security'. This centre, which changed its name in 2016 to Maritime Domain Awareness for Trade – Gulf of Guinea, works as a voluntary reporting system, and encourages vessels to report their position and course of direction as well as any suspect activity they might encounter.

=== Yaoundé Code of Conduct ===
On June 25, 2013, 25 countries from West and Central Africa gathered in Yaoundé, Cameroon to lay the basis for a common regional strategy to prevent and prosecute illicit activities in the waters of the Gulf of Guinea. The Yaoundé Summit led to the creation of three mechanisms: the Yaoundé Code of Conduct, the Heads of States Declaration and the Memorandum of Understanding between regional organisations. The Yaoundé Code of Conduct (YCOC), is a comprehensive regional maritime security framework aimed at enhancing cooperation and information-sharing in the wider Gulf of Guinea. It is the widest and most ambitious regional initiative taken so far to counter piracy in the Gulf of Guinea. Despite piracy and armed robbery at sea being the primary drivers of its creation, the scope of the YCOC covers several additional illicit maritime activities, such as illegal, unreported and unregulated (IUU) fishing, narcotics and wildlife trafficking, maritime pollution, and maritime terrorism. The YCOC, also known as the Code of Conduct Concerning the Repression of Piracy Armed Robbery against Ships, and Illicit Maritime Activity in West and Central Africa, consists of 21 articles.

The Governments that have signed the code of conduct are Angola, Benin, Burkina Faso, Burundi, Cameroon, Cape Verde, the Central African Republic, Chad, Congo Côte d'Ivoire, the Democratic Republic of the Congo, Equatorial Guinea, Gabon, the Gambia, Ghana, Guinea, Guinea Bissau, Liberia, Mali, Niger, Nigeria, São Tomé and Príncipe, Senegal, Sierra Leone, and Togo. The responsibilities and tasks that signatory states have committed to include to share and report relevant information, arrest, investigate, and prosecute persons who have committed piracy or are reasonably suspected of committing piracy, rescuing ships, persons and property subject to piracy, designating a national focal point to facilitate coordinated, cooperating on the development and promotion of training and educational programs for the management of the marine environment. In addition, two regional information-sharing centers were developed and put into place in order to enable the implementation of the YCOC: The Regional Centre for Maritime Security in Central Africa (CRESMAC) based in Pointe-Noire, Republic of the Congo, which assists the countries of the Economic Community of Central African States (ECCAS) as well as The Regional Coordination Centre for Maritime Security in West Africa (CRESMAO), based in Abidjan, Côte d'Ivoire, which serves the countries of the Economic Community of West Africa (ECOWAS.) The Inter-regional Coordination Centre in Yaoundé, Cameroon is coordinating both information-sharing centers.

However, it is worth noting that the Yaoundé Code of Conduct, as many other international conventions and other similar code of conduct, is not a legally binding document and does not impose any obligation on signatory states. Therefore, its full and effective implementation is necessarily dependent on the good will, wealth and capacity of such states.

=== Deep Blue Project ===
On June 10, 2021, the Nigerian President Muhammadu Buhari launched the Deep Blue Project, officially known as The Integrated National Security and Waterways Protection Infrastructure. The project was initiated by the Federal Ministry of Transportation and Federal Ministry of Defence but is being implemented by the Nigerian Maritime Administration and Safety Agency (NIMASA). Before the launch of this ambitious project, Nigeria's Maritime Security Unit (MSU) has conducted simulation exercises and demonstrated their preparedness of tackling piracy outside the coast of Nigeria. The primary objective of the Deep Blue Project is to secure Nigerian Waters up to the Gulf of Guinea and give Nigeria more leverage to harness the enormous resources of the maritime environment resultantly enabling further economic diversification. Moreover, the project is divided into three platforms focusing on maritime security on land, sea and air. Firstly, the land assets include the Command, Control, Communication, Computer, and Intelligence Centre for intelligence gathering, 16 armoured vehicles for coastal patrol; and 600 specially trained troops for interdiction. Secondly, the sea assets include 2 special Missions Vessels and 17 fast interceptor Boats. Finally, the air assets comprise 2 Special Mission Aircraft for surveillance of the country's Exclusive Economic Zone (EEZ), as well as 3 Special Mission Helicopters. These ambitious efforts and assets makes the Deep Blue Project the first national integrated maritime security strategy in West and Central Africa. The idea is that this strategic partnership between NIMASA and international organisations will be helpful in the efforts to improve the regional approach to solving maritime security challenges in the Gulf of Guinea.

== International response ==
=== International actors & capacity building ===
The Gulf of Guinea is a global shipping route with international shipping conglomerates passing through the region every day. With this flow of the global economy through the Gulf, the issue of piracy has caught the attention of international actors. Significant capacity building investments have been made by international actors, like the US, China, and some European states, in the Gulf of Guinea to train local militaries and support states in the regions to counter piracy. Capacity building is a central commonality out of all the varying national maritime strategies that international actors and the core of many of these actors' counter piracy in the Gulf of Guinea.

Nevertheless, actions of international actors in the Gulf can have unintended consequences, such as political kidnappings. A localised approach with dialogue focused on regional clans on land can have a greater level of success to counter piracy, rather than efforts that are singularly concentrated on the land or sea. The localised focus on actors in communities is important because it is the local communities that sustain piracy and if international actors want to tackle piracy in the Gulf, they need to hone their counter piracy and capacity building on the root causes of piracy. This requires a concerted capacity building drive to strengthen local governments, reduce corruption and illegal economic opportunities.

The push by international actors to counter piracy has been relatively successful off the coast of Somalia, as a result, counter piracy in the Western Indian Ocean holds valuable lessons for tackling piracy in the Gulf of Guinea. At present the institutions and efforts of international actors to respond to the prevalent threat of piracy in the Gulf of Guinea have proven to be largely fruitless. The two models of counter piracy by international actors allows for understanding the current counter piracy situation in the Gulf; the 'failed state' model – where international actors have a relatively free rein to counter piracy, which was witnessed in Somalia – and the 'regional' model – which requires the international community to cooperate, coordinate and work within the confines of numerous central governments in the region, which is on display in the Gulf of Guinea. As counter piracy efforts in Somalia and the Gulf of Guinea showcase, the 'failed state' model is best suited to international actors dealing with piracy. The plethora of robust central governments in the GoG makes the 'regional' model less effective for counter piracy by international actors.

=== The United Nations ===
The UN Security Council issued two resolutions, in 2011 and 2012 respectively, initiated by Benin and Togo, which set out the need for promoting the maintenance of peace and stability in general in the Gulf of Guinea region and encourage international partners to enhance the counter-piracy capabilities of regional states and organizations. In the 2011 resolution, the Security Council expressed

"its concern over the threat that piracy and armed robbery at sea pose to the safety of seafarers and other persons, including through their being taken as hostages, and deeply concerned by the violence employed by pirates and persons involved in piracy and armed robbery at sea in the Gulf of Guinea."

Consequently, the organization

"encourages States […] through concerted action, to counter piracy and armed robbery at sea in the Gulf of Guinea through the conduct of bilateral or regional maritime patrols consistent with relevant international law (UN link) and calls upon States, in cooperation with the shipping industry, the insurance industry and the International Maritime Organization (IMO) to issue to ships entitled to fly their flag, appropriate advice and guidance within context of the Gulf of Guinea."

In the 2012 resolution, the Security Council,

"expressing its deep concern about the threat that piracy and armed robbery at sea in the Gulf of Guinea pose to international navigation, security and the economic development of states in the region urges States of the region of the Gulf of Guinea to take prompt action, at national and regional levels with the support of the international community where able, and by mutual agreement, to develop and implement national maritime security strategies, including for the establishment of a legal framework for the prevention, and repression of piracy and armed robbery at sea and as well as prosecution of persons engaging in those crimes, and punishment of those convicted of those crimes and encourages regional cooperation in this regard."

=== The International Maritime Organization ===
The International Maritime Organization's 2017 strategy for implementing sustainable maritime security measures in West and Central Africa outlines the organization's strategy to enhance maritime security in West and Central Africa, with a view to countering piracy and armed robberies against ships and to support the development of the maritime sector. This strategy consists of several elements, including the effective implementation of IMO conventions, in order to build the necessary legislative infrastructure to criminalize piracy; bilateral assistance and continued follow up engagement, to be carried out in a tailored way so as to match the needs of IMO member states; regional training, which focuses on developing legal frameworks for the prevention and repression of piracy, and on training officials at various level for the investigation of piracy-related crimes; assignment of expertise to accelerate change and facilitating channels of communications among IMO member states.

The International Maritime Bureau (IMO) reported in January 2020 that piracy in the Gulf of Guinea had increased by 50% in 2019.

=== The European Union ===
The European Union has taken initiatives against piracy in the Gulf of Guinea. In 2014 the EU adopted its strategy for the Gulf of Guinea, which is based on the overall goals laid out under the aforementioned Yaoundé Code of Conduct. It has four strategic objectives: building a common understanding of the scale of the threat (reducing so-called "sea-blindness"), helping regional governments to put in place robust multiagency institutions, supporting the development of prosperous economies and strengthening the existing cooperation structures. In addition, the EU is attempting to develop long-term security and stability through the promotion of inclusive growth, generating benefits from wealth and job creation for all people.

The maritime security of the Gulf is a source of major concern for Denmark. The Danish government has launched a priority paper 2019-2022, which is currently the latest political agreement adapted by a broad political coalition for anti-piracy commitments, outlining a strategy with a multi-targeted approach to fight piracy primary in the Gulf of Guinea. On average, 40 Danish ships sail there daily, representing a commodity value of almost DKK 10 billion per year. From November 2021 and for a period of five months, a Danish navy ship will be engaged in the Gulf with a SeaHawk helicopter and special forces from the naval task force on board. The ship will be tasked with combating piracy, supporting or "escorting" merchant ships, and if necessary to come to their aid or carry out rescues. The proposal from the Danish Ministry of Defence also grants the Danish frigate the mandate to "seize the pirates' weapons and equipment".

=== Interpol ===
Interpol has also launched a number of initiatives to improve the capabilities of the local police forces to tackle piracy effectively. The action of Interpol has revolved around three main areas: improving the evidence collection capabilities of the local police forces; facilitating a better cooperation between the actors of the different countries involved; making sure that hostages are debriefed and interviewed and all relevant information is gathered.

== Legislation ==
=== Jurisdiction ===
The legal framework governing piracy and other maritime offences in the Gulf of Guinea is historically The United Nations Convention on the Law of the Sea (UNCLOS). In addition, projects have been launched by international organisations and agencies such as the IMO, IMB and regional efforts by continental bodies such as the European Union, African Union and other continents, sub-regional efforts as in the case of the Gulf of Guinea by the Economic Community of West African States (ECOWAS).

The international legal regime pertaining to maritime piracy has developed and grown over the years. These changes were prompted due increased maritime domain awareness and to lacunas in the legal system, which surfaced when the codified laws were implemented. However, the lack of harmonisation of universal laws and national laws, as well as overlapping and contradicting jurisdictions across states impedes the process of deterring piracy. There are suggestions that in order to facilitate effective prosecution, the Gulf of Guinea states should favour a uniform legislative framework that comprehensively domesticates the relevant key provisions of The United Nations Convention on the Law of the Sea (UNCLOS) and The Convention for the Suppression of Unlawful Acts against the Safety of Maritime Navigation (SUA). However, piracy in the Gulf of Guinea occurs mostly in the territorial seas and EEZ's of coastal states. In this sense, the primary responsibility to suppress piracy lies with the national security forces of the countries in the region. Notably, the growth of piracy in the region is due mainly to the inability of the coastal states to defend their territorial seas. Therefore, it is in their strategic interest to develop and implement national laws that are criminalising piracy. So far, the only country that has implemented a law exclusively focusing on the prosecution of Piracy is Nigeria: The Suppression of piracy and other maritime offences act, 2019 (SPOMO Act). Before the enactment of the SPOMO Act, there was no legislation criminalising piracy in the Gulf of Guinea which made prosecution of pirates very challenging as the pirates had to be prosecuted under other illicit maritime offences.

=== Suppression of Piracy and Other Maritime Offences Act, 2019 ===
Nigerian waters remain hotspots for piratical acts, having the highest number of pirate attacks in the world in 2020. Furthermore, there has been no prosecution of pirates up until recently, despite the compelling evidence confirming that piracy and armed robbery against ships within the Nigerian maritime domain have remained consistent over the past years. Cases abound where pirates were arrested by the Nigerian Navy and the arrested pirates were later released on bail without further prosecution for piratical activities. The prosecution of pirates is a veritable way to stem the tide of piracy off the coast of Nigeria. While prosecution of suspected criminals has been a challenge historically, the Suppression of Piracy and Other Maritime Offences (SPOMO) Act passed by the 9th National Assembly would now provide a legal backing for prosecution and punishment of offenders.

One of the key mandates of The SPOMO is to curtail illegal activities of pirates at sea as well as to reduce the incidence of other maritime offences in domestic and international waters. The SPOMO act's definition of piracy follows the definition of piracy under Article 101 of UNCLOS. One objective of the SPOMO Act is to domesticate UNCLOS and SUA, and as such harmonise the national framework based on key International legal provisions on piracy. Another aspect that the SPOMO Act is clarifying and defining is the responsibilities of each maritime stakeholder to avert conflicts of roles and overlapping responsibilities. As for the mandate to exercise jurisdiction, the Act gives the Federal High Court (FHC) exclusive jurisdiction to hear and determine any matter under the Act.

In August, 2020 the Federal High Court in Lagos, Nigeria convicted the first pirates under the Suppression of Piracy and Other Maritime Offences Act. The three prosecuted individuals include two Nigerians and one foreign national were fined $52,000 each for hijacking a ship in March, 2020 and securing a ransom of $200,000 for the release of its crew.

== Selected attacks ==
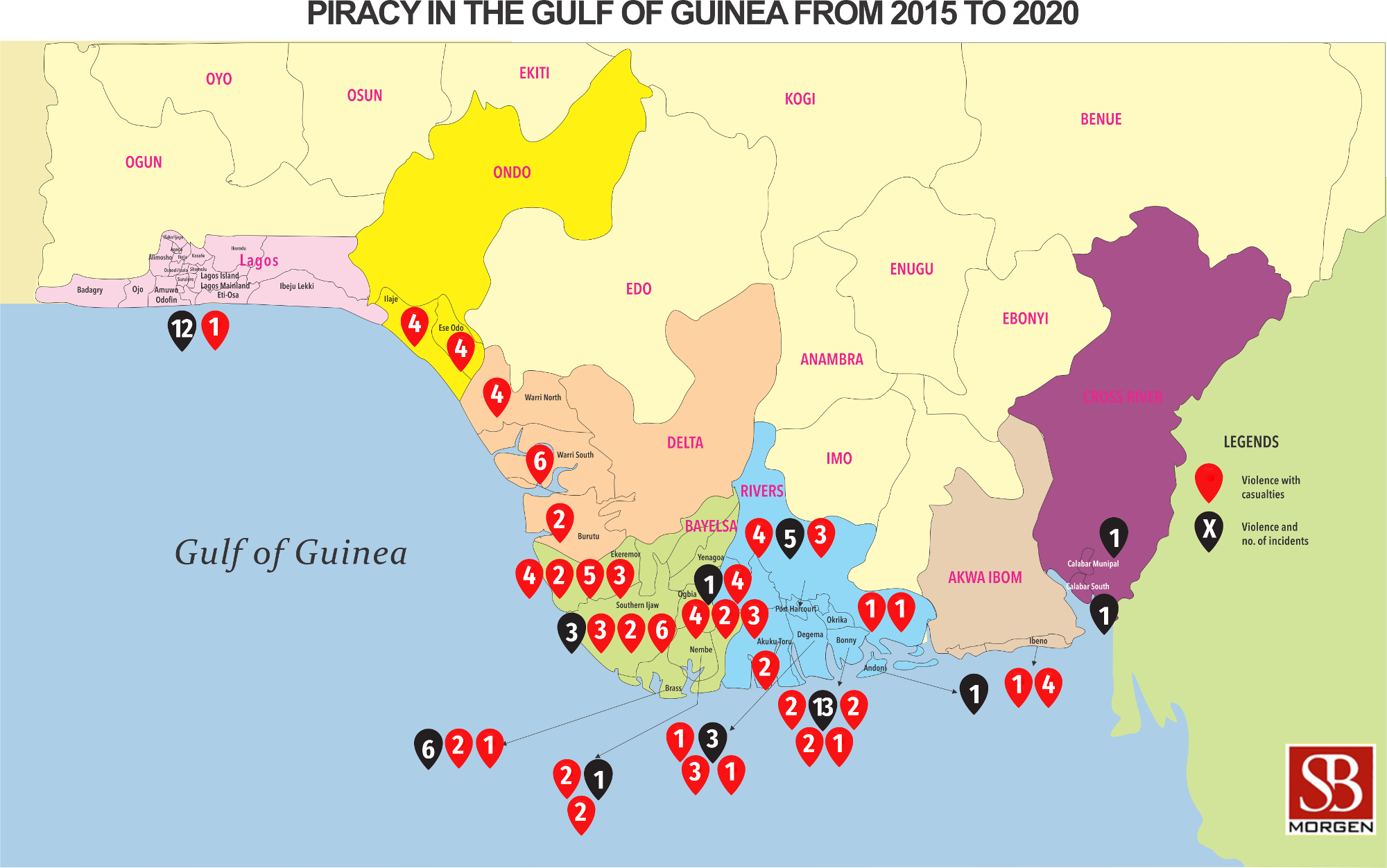
Graphic by SBM Intelligence showing piracy incidents around Nigeria's coast between 2015 and 2020

For full number of reported attacks each year, see #Statistics.

=== 2009 ===
- January 4, 2009: Pirates hijacked the French ship Bourbon Leda with five Nigerians, two Ghanaians, one Cameroonian and one Indonesian on board. It was freed on January 7.
- April 21, 2009: Rebels attacked the Turkish ship Ilena Mercan and kidnapped two crewmen.
- November 24, 2009: Pirates hijacked the Liberian-flagged Cancale Star off Benin and killed a Ukrainian officer before robbing the ship.
- December 1, 2009: The Ghanaian Navy intercepted the hijacked oil tanker African Prince a week after it had been taken. The pirates escaped; they had killed the ship's chef.

=== 2010–2015 ===
- January 21, 2010: Gunmen attacked the diesel tanker MT Meredith and kidnapped a Romanian, who was released a day later.
- March 13, 2010: A Chinese fishing vessel was hijacked off the Bakassi Peninsula, Cameroon. Seven fishermen were abducted by the so-called "Africa Marine Commando". The kidnappers demanded a ransom and later released the vessel and its passengers on March 18.
- March 28, 2010: Assailants hijacked a Nigerian boat carrying goods, demanded $1.5 million for the release of the hostages and the boat, and no one was wounded in the attack.
- September 23, 2010: Three Frenchmen were kidnapped from a vessel belonging to the company Bourbon off the Nigerian coast.
- November 16, 2010: An assault against an offshore water vessel belonging to the French oil company Perenco killing two security guards and three Cameroon Rapid Intervention Battalion and a militant. The African Marine Commando claimed responsibility for the attack.
- February 2, 2011: Armed assailants in boats kidnapped 11 Cameroon government officials off a boat by unknown means; no deaths were reported.
- February 7, 2011: Two Cameroonian policemen were killed in an attack in the Bakassi region. No one claimed the attack, but members of the Africa Marine Commando are pointed out of the attack.
- August 3, 2011: Two Panamanian-flagged tankers were attacked off Benin's coast but the ships were not taken. In the previous week, an Italian diesel tanker and a Swedish tanker were also attacked off Benin.
- August 19, 2012: A British-owned oil tanker was hijacked in the Port of Togo. Authorities suggest that the same group hijacked a Greek-owned oil tanker in this region.
- August 28, 2012: A Greek-owned oil tanker was hijacked in the Port of Togo. Authorities suggested that the pirates would siphon off the gas oil from these types of vessel hijackings in the region.
- September 4, 2012: A Singaporean-flagged oil tanker, MT Abu Dhabi Star, was hijacked off the coast of Lagos, Nigeria. The pirates broke glass windows to access the bridge of the 183-metre (600 ft) long vessel. The pirates fled as soon as they realized a Nigerian naval ship was approaching. It was suspected that although the pirates fled, they may have attempted to siphon off the gas from the ship.
- October 15, 2012: A Luxembourgish-flagged anchor handling vessel named AHT Bourbon Liberty 249, was hijacked while off the coast of Nigeria.
- December 23, 2012: an Italian-registered ship was hijacked by seven Nigerian pirates, off the coast of the state of Bayelsa. The pirates successively released the ship with most of the crew, but took three Italians and a Ukrainian as hostages, who were freed a couple of weeks later.
- January 16, 2013: A Panamanian-flagged vessel, ITRI (owned by the Ivory Coast company, Koda Maritime), was hijacked while transferring 5,000 tons of oil near Abidjan.
- February 3, 2013: A Luxembourg-flagged oil tanker, Gascogne (owned by France) was hijacked approximately 130 km (70 nmi) south of the port city of Abidjan.
- February 4, 2013: A Marshall Islands-flagged chemical tanker, Pyxis Delta (owned by the UAE), was hijacked off the coast of Nigeria. A Filipino crew-member was killed during the hijacking.
- February 11, 2013: A UK-flagged cargo ship, Ester C (owned by the Isle of Wight-based Carisbrooke Shipping), was hijacked by pirates between the Cameroonian port of Douala and the port of Malabo in Equatorial Guinea.
- April 16, 2013: A Greek-flagged crude oil carrier, Cap Theodora, was attacked by pirates 67 km (36 nmi) off the coast of Principe Island, Gulf of Guinea. The ship thwarted the attack by increasing its speed and performing evasive maneuvers.
- April 25, 2013: A Liberian-flagged container ship, Hansa Marburg (owned by Hamburg-based shipping firm Leonhardt and Blumberg), was hijacked 240 km (130 nmi) off the coast of Equatorial Guinea, with four crew members on board.
- May 25, 2013: The Nigerian-flagged oil products tanker, MT Matrix, was hijacked approximately 74 km (40 nmi) off the Bayelsa State of Nigeria.

=== 2015-2019 ===
- September 22, 2018: The Swiss cargo ship MV Glarus, laden with wheat, pirated; of 19 crew members, 12 were taken hostage.
- January 2, 2019: The Panama registered container ship MSC Mandy was attacked off the coast of Cotonou, Benin. The crew were taken hostage and released on January 31.
- November 2, 2019: The Norwegian flagged bulkcarrier MV Bonita was attacked by pirates and the nine crewmembers were taken hostage. The crew was later released on December 6.
- On December 4, 2019, pirates attacked Nave Constellation 77 nautical miles off Bonny Island. Leaving ship and cargo intact, the pirated kidnapped 19 crew for ransom.

=== 2020s ===
- April 19, 2020: The Portuguese-flagged cargo ship Tommi Ritscher was attacked by pirates off the coast of Cotonou, Benin. The Bulgarian captain and seven other sailors were kidnapped. The captain was freed on May 25.
- January 23, 2021: The Liberia-flagged container ship V/S Mozart was attacked by pirates in Gulf of Guinea. There were 19 crewmembers in the vessel, 1 killed, 15 kidnapped. The ship arrived to Port-Gentil at Gabon at 11:00 TRT with 3 remaining crewmembers.
- November 25, 2021: The Royal Danish Navy frigate HDMS Esbern Snare intercepted a skiff that was heading towards several merchant ships. The pirates opened fire on a RHIB carrying members of the Frogman Corps, who returned fire, killing four pirates. None of the Danes were injured, but their RHIB was hit. Four surviving pirates were detained and taken aboard HDMS Esbern Snare. 3 of the 4 pirates were later released south off the coast of Nigeria. The incident took place 25–30 nautical miles (46–56 km; 29–35 mi) south of the territorial boundary of Nigeria. One pirate, named Lucky Francis, was severely wounded in the attack, and due to his injuries one of his legs was amputated in an emergency operation onboard HDMS Esbern Snarre. The pirate was brought to Denmark for medical treatment and prosecution for endandering the lives of Danish soldiers. He was found guilty but did not serve any time in prison due to his bad health. Efforts to extradite the pirate were unsuccessful and as of 2023 the pirate has sought asylum in Denmark.
- December 13, 2021: The Liberian-flagged merchant ship MV Tonsberg was attacked by pirates near Bioko. A helicopter was dispatched from The Royal Danish Navy frigate HDMS Esbern Snare and the pirates left MV Tonsberg in a skiff along with six hostages. The pirates escaped with their hostages into Nigerian waters. When later boarding MV Tonsberg, a crew member that had been shot by the pirates during their take-over was discovered and transferred to HDMS Esbern Snare for treatment.
- March 25, 2023: Liberian-flagged oil and chemical tanker Monjasa Reformer was attacked by pirates 140 nautical miles west off the coast of Pointe-Noire in Congo. The crew of 16 sought refuge in the safe room of the vessel. The pirates were unsuccessful in their attempt to board the vessel.
- In May 2025, armed pirates boarded a cargo ship travelling between Cameroon and the Democratic Republic of the Congo, abducting a crew member while the remaining crew sheltered in the vessel's citadel.
- In December 2025, the Portuguese-flagged LPG carrier CGAS Saturn was boarded by pirates while sailing toward Malabo, Equatorial Guinea. The attack occurred about 93 km (50 nautical miles) offshore and resulted in the kidnapping of nine crew members and the injury of another.
- On January 10 2026, armed attackers abducted nine crew members from the fishing vessel IB Fish 7 in Gabonese waters.
- In February 2026, gunmen attacked and robbed fishing boats off the coast of Ghana.

== See also ==
- List of ships attacked by Nigerian pirates
- Piracy in the Singapore Strait
- Piracy in the Strait of Malacca
- Piracy off the coast of Somalia
- Piracy on Falcon Lake
- Conflict in the Niger Delta
- Bakassi conflict
