= Petro-piracy in the Gulf of Guinea =

As a practice of piracy, petro-piracy, also sometimes called oil piracy or petro piracy, is defined as “illegal taking of oil after vessel hijacks, which are sometimes executed with the use of motorships” with huge potential financial rewards. Petro-piracy is mostly a practice that is connected to and originates from piracy in the Gulf of Guinea, but examples of petro-piracy outside of the Gulf of Guinea is not uncommon. At least since 2008, the Gulf of Guinea has been home to pirates practicing petro-piracy by targeting the region's extensive oil industry. Piracy in the Gulf of Guinea has risen in the last years to become the hot spot of piracy globally with 76 actual and attempted attacks, according to the International Maritime Bureau (IMB). Most of these attacks in the Gulf of Guinea take place in inland or territorial waters, but recently pirates have been proven to venture further out to sea, e.g. crew members were kidnapped from the tanker David B. 220 nautical miles outside of Benin. Pirates most often targets vessels carrying oil products and kidnappings of crew for ransom. IMB reports that countries in the Gulf of Guinea, Angola, Benin, Cameroon, Equatorial Guinea, Ghana, Guinea, Ivory Coast, Togo, Congo, and, especially, Nigeria, have experienced petro-piracy and kidnappings of crew as the most common trends of piracy attacks in the Gulf of Guinea.

The region of the Gulf of Guinea brings together a very large number of oil-rich, coastal states, forming a coastline of 6.000 kilometres from Senegal in West Africa to Angola in Southern Africa. Furthermore, the region supplies a very large amount of oil to European and American markets, as well as being an important transit route for international oil transportation. These two factors, oil production and international oil transportation, make the Gulf of Guinea a favourable area for petro-piracy. Off the coast of Nigeria and around the Niger Delta is “the epicentre for illicit energy-maritime criminal activities with petro-pirates…”. Especially, on the coastal waters in Nigeria, acts of depredation against ships and fixed oil installations have been taking place, consequently resulting in “far greater financial losses and a far wider economic impact than anything seen so far anywhere in the world.”. Generally, piracy in the Gulf of Guinea is to some extent a Nigerian problem – as it originates for insurgency and instability as well as corruption in Nigeria.

== Practice ==
=== Definition ===
The practice of petro-piracy can be defined as “illegal taking of oil after vessel hijacks, which are sometimes executed with the use of motorships” and speedboats. Petro-pirates are hijacking vessels and then selling its content of oil to gain financial rewards, but also, recently, kidnapping crews for ransom. Petro-piracy can be seen as “a seaborne extension of the politics of insurgency on land”, especially from the Niger Delta with social unrest, poverty, and violence. In recent years, the practice of kidnappings for ransom has been an associated concept in the act of petro-piracy, becoming the dominating act of violence against crews at vessels. Central to the practice of petro-piracy are taking oil illegally, the use of motorships and speed boats, selling of oil for economic rewards, and kidnapping of crews for ransom. The practice of petro-piracy is certainly related to, although different from, the individual concepts of oil-theft, oil bunkering, and, as mentioned, kidnappings. Though, the definitional element of “illegal taking of oil” encompasses oil-theft to the extent that it happens at sea or on territorial and internal waters.

In terms of being conceptualised as petro-piracy, the practice must live up to what is defined as piracy – illegal acts of violence, detention, or depredation for private ends against any shipcraft, aircraft, or against anyone or property. Though, as such the concept of piracy is contested in terms of defining where the practice of piracy is committed. In the United Nations Convention on the Law of the Sea (UNCLOS), the United Nations (UN) defines piracy as only emerging at the seas and not in territorial nor internal waters. This narrow definition excludes much of the petro-piracy incidents in Gulf of Guinea, as many emerges on territorial waters. The International Maritime Organization (IMO) expands the definition of piracy to include what is termed armed robbery, being “any illegal act of violence or detention or any act of depredation, or threat thereof” on internal water, territorial waters, and on archipelagic waters. Even though this difference bears practical differences of legal jurisdiction, a broader definition of piracy, encompassing both piracy at the high seas and armed robbery at internal, territorial, and archipelagic waters, is generally accepted in the literature. As such, petro-piracy can be placed within the broader definition of piracy, encompassing both piracy at the seas and armed robbery. Understood as a practice, piracy generally encompasses activities such as “going out to sea and targeting vessels, boarding vessels, stealing valuables, taking hostages, steering vessels, safeguarding hostages and vessels, negotiating ransoms, releasing vessels and crews, and distributing ransom income”, objects such as “skiffs, weapons, navigation devices, or ladders for boarding”, and skills and know-how such as “how to board vessels, to handle hostages, negotiate or organise ransom deliveries".

The origin of petro-piracy can be traced back to the globalization of commerce and criminality. Petro-piracy, oil-theft and oil bunkering appeared as a practice when the business of oil production and oil transportation began to dominate the Gulf of Guinea and West Africa at large. Though, it should only be considered as a phase of the longer history of piracy in West Africa – spanning form the slave trade, to the palm oil trade, and now the oil business. Certainly, the exploration and production of oil, and the following boom of foreign trade, changed the piracy in West Africa. For instance, in Nigeria oil was discovered in 1956, which in the next decades made the business flourish, and the port of the capital, Lagos, boasted of more 400 anchored vessels, creating a perfect environment for piracy and robbery at large. The hub of piracy activity then shifted to the Niger Delta in Nigeria, occupied by aggrieved, militant groups, such as MEND, in the form of militarised and politicised gangs protesting local control of resources. To this day, the Niger Delta is the area of epicentre for piracy in the Gulf of Guinea. Piracy in the Gulf of Guinea then became a well-organised business, taking advantage of the oil-industry in the region. What makes piracy in Gulf of Guinea special is that the piracy activities are connected to and, most likely, originates from issues on land. Some of these issues are general to the states of Gulf of Guinea, such as the curse of oil, over-dependence on the sea, and economic depredation, but even more specific to Nigeria with severe corruption, insufficient or failed governmental initiatives, the Nigerian youth, environmental degradation, and, especially, the Niger Delta with its militant groups, social unrest, and many more issues.

=== Aspects of petro-piracy ===
The semantic field of petro-piracy is a clustering of terms interacting with each other. The semantically related concepts are oil-theft, oil bunkering, kidnappings, and maritime security.

Oil-theft entails “cannibalization of oil pipelines, outright stealing of ships laden with crude oil, or falsification of bill lading”. Oil-theft can be conceptualized as a layered concept, where small-scaled oil theft is conducted by locals in the form of pipeline tappings, stealing, diverting or smuggling, whereas larger-scale oil-theft encompasses hacking into pipelines or tapping oil from the well-head. For example, the practice of oil-theft began in the 1980s with amateur operations in Nigeria but has since then evolved into a sophisticated and highly technological practice. A related concept is oil-bunkering, defined as an operation “involving fuelling of different kinds of ships within ports, inland waterways, and on the high sea through bunkering licenses” or a “ship-to-ship transfer of oil on the sea”, a practice that is illegal when done without license, which often is the case in a country such as Nigeria. These practices of “illegal taking of oil”, in the form of oil-theft and oil-bunkering, can take place at both land and at sea. Both concepts, oil-theft and oil-bunkering, involve an aftermath of transportation of the stolen oil, a storage and refining stage, and, at last, distribution. Evidence shows that oil-theft and oil bunkering (and, later, petro-piracy) has been used to fund militias to “enrich them and importing weapons” in the region of the Niger Delta in Nigeria.

Generally, kidnapping for ransom is a practice of abducting a victim, negotiating a significant ransom, and concluding the deal with financial gain. Kidnappings for ransom can be done because of a subculture of violence or based on rational motives. These kidnappings for ransom can vary temporally – from hours to years. Kidnappings for ransom are more likely in times of crises and conflict in a specific country, for instance during periods of political, economic, and social crises. Kidnapping for ransom is an activity of piracy, which as mentioned has gained popularity in the Gulf of Guinea. Kidnapping for ransom is related to petro-piracy, because the two practices are increasingly combined by pirates in the Gulf of Guinea, and, more so, kidnappings for ransom have in the last two years been the dominating practice of the two.

The concept of maritime security has had a recent upsurge in importance and popularity, as it has been included in security agendas by the EU, NATO, UK, and USA, especially when piracy off the coast of Somalia emerged in 2008 as a new major threat. To be sure the concept of maritime security is an essentially contested concept, or what Cornwall calls a buzz-word, meaning a concept with vagueness that can “embrace a multitude of possible meanings”. Apart from viewing the buzzword of maritime security through theories of securitization and practice theory, Bueger suggests viewing it through semiotics. The relation between maritime security and petro-piracy are primarily connected to economic development and human security. As for economic development, it is related to vitality of the oceans for the economy, and as such the concept of blue economy is central, concerning sustainable management strategies in relation to economic development. Petro-piracy in the Gulf of Guinea is certainly a threat to economic development, as attacks on oil tankers and oil installations at sea are undermining the economy and development of coastal states, especially minding the dependence of coastal states on the resources of the sea. As for human security, which is inter-related to economic development through resilience and food security of coastal populations, it is understood as an alternative concept to national security and focuses on the needs of people rather than nations. Petro-piracy in the Gulf of Guinea is certainly also a threat to human security, as it through attacks on vessels threatens the lives of seafarers. When viewing petro-piracy as an issue that begins on land, it indirectly becomes a threat to human security through economic deprivation, environmental depredation and climate change, corruption, and youth unemployment. Furthermore, petro-piracy can also be viewed as a threat to national security as it often overlaps with other outlaw and threatening activities, such as insurgency in the Niger Delta of Nigeria as well as in Cameroon, and tensions in Chad, the Republic of Congo, and Angola. Overall, petro-piracy should be viewed as a concept within maritime security in relation to economic development, human security, and, to some extent, national security.

=== Modus operandi ===
Generally, petro-piracy engages in layered and networked mechanisms, in which operations are planned, conducted, and post-operationally handled. This, more specifically, consists of inter-linked stages, such as target selection, planning, attack, transloading, transportation, storage, and distribution. Petro-piracy is therefore highly organized with “considerable logistic complexity, indicating group cohesion, planning, and financing”. The modus operandi of petro-piracy, also termed its value chain, is described in the following.

The first stage of petro-piracy is target selection and planning. Here, intelligence is gathered, targets are identified, pirates are recruited, weapons and other supplies are acquired, and the operation is financed. The financier can both be an insider or an outsider of piracy groups, but most operations are financed by international syndicates, linked to militant groups in the Niger Delta who facilitates much of organisational process. Information from informants, such as commercial agents, corrupt officials, and criminal networks are key to this stage of planning. A known example of this in 2011 is when Nigerian pirates claimed that they were fed information from the Nigerian Ministry of Petroleum Resources and the Nigerian National Petroleum Corporation. Maritime experience and traditions are also essential elements, encompassing know-how on maritime, navigational, tracking, and transferring. Furthermore, information and knowledge of the maritime corridor of the Gulf of Guinea is key. A case in point, is the hijacking of MT Kerala in Angolan waters in 2014 – it was picked out of 30 ships and 270 tonnes oil cargo was stolen while fleeing 1300 miles. The extent and success of the planning, of course, depend on how well organised the pirate groups are and their numbers, but most of all it depends on the abilities and the capabilities of the leader in the pirate group.

The second stage of petro-piracy is the attack phase. This is where the plan is executed. Surprise, speed, and mobility are of the essence for petro-pirates in the Gulf of Guinea, which is why “fast, easy to manoeuvre, and shallow drafts ships”, such as motorboats, are preferred. When the attacked vessel is boarded, the vessel's crew is attacked, and its bridge is hijacked. The pirates are during the operation heavily armed and highly violent. Even though, oil-theft has been the most dominating practice of petro-piracy, kidnappings of crew for ransom have become an important part of operations' objective and tactics. Kidnappings, though, do not take place further than 150 kilometres from shore. Otherwise, the main targets are vessels with petroleum or crude oil and chemical tankers. In some cases, like Somalian pirates, petro-pirates in the Gulf of Guinea have used motherships as a deceptive ploy to close the distance to target vessels. After hijacking the vessel, its communication and automatic identification systems are disabled, the vessel is then transported to an offshore hideout, such as the Niger Delta in Nigeria, and the cargo is sold.

The third stage of petro-piracy is the mentioned transloading and transportation, as well as storage and sale of the stolen oil or petroleum from the hijacked vessel. This step is not directly a practice of petro-piracy but is vital to its completion. Translocation of oil or petroleum is either done immediately after the highjack, and then transported away, or after the highjacked vessel has been transported a way to a hideout. Especially transloading is a complex process where experience is vital. The following step is cargo offloading into storage facilities for sale and distribution – some products are sold at local markets and others are sold at the black market. As such, there exists a trivet of oil theft, petro-piracy, and illegal fuel trading that has become a co-existing criminal enterprise – a so-called black enterprise. In the trivet, there is a clear segmentation and division of roles and of labour between thieves, petro-pirates, and illegal fuel traders. The enterprise is “anchored on a network, devoid of a hierarchy… but is not lacking in organisation, with job(s) differentiated and segmented across a business value chain… it therefore means that a network and a market co-exist”. As such, this enterprise is both quite complex and exclusive from outsiders.

=== Incidents ===
The two main sources of reports on piracy are the International Maritime Bureau, which covers piracy activities all over the world, and NigeriaWatch.org which covers piracy incidents in Nigeria. Apart from covering different areas, the difference between these two sources is their measurement of piracy, where IMB focuses on actual and attempted attacks, and NigeriaWatch.org focuses on number of deaths following pirate attacks. As mentioned above, piracy in the Gulf of Guinea has risen in the last years to become the hot-spot of piracy globally with 76 actual and attempted attacks, according to the International Maritime Bureau. In 2019, piracy attacks were at a lower level with 64 actual and attempted attacks. Counting for all actual and attempted piracy attacks in the world, it did rise from 162 in 2019 to 195 in 2020. In total, Africa is the region with most actual and attempted attacks of 88, whereas Asia with 62 and the Americas wit 30 are the regions with second and third most actual and attempted attacks in 2020. Most of these attacks happen while the targeted vessels are anchored with 88 incidents or are steaming with 66 incidents in 2020. Furthermore, the most common type of attack is boarding of the target vessels with 161 incidents in 2020. The most common type of violence against the crew of the target vessels is kidnapping for ransom with 135 incidents in 2020, while hostage taking is second with 34 incidents. Here Nigeria is, yet again, the hot-spot with 62 kidnappings in 2020. Interestingly, bulk carriers and chemical/product tankers are the most frequently type of vessels attacked with 51 and 53 incidents. IMB reports that countries in the Gulf of Guinea, Angola, Benin, Cameroon, Equatorial Guinea, Ghana, Guinea, Ivory Coast, Togo, Congo, and, especially, Nigeria, have experienced oil/petroleum theft and kidnappings of crew, which also are the most common trends of piracy attacks. Interestingly, this shows three trends: 1) Gulf of Guinea is the hot-spot of piracy globally, 2) vessels carrying oil or petroleum are most often targeted, 3) boarding is the most common tactic, and 4) kidnappings are the most common type of violence against crew.

There have been several examples of petro-piracy in the Gulf of Guinea. The first reported attack of petro-pirates began in the 1970s and early 1980s in Nigeria, Lagos, where it was reported that up to 12 vessels carrying oil were attacked every day. One of the earliest petro-piracy attacks was the hijacking of the vessel Lindinga Ivory, where the master and 14 crew members were killed. Though, in 1984 piracy incidents decreased, most likely due to falling oil prices. As the unrest in the Niger Delta rose, the petro-piracy activities increased, where multiple ambiguous attacks on Nigerian oil platforms took place, e.g. in 2008 when MEND attacked the floating oil production platform 100 km from shore. Furthermore, in 2008, petro-pirates attacked the vessel MT Meredith carrying 4000 tons of diesel fuel. In 2012, MT Anuket Emerald was hijacked, its oil cargo was transferred to a chartered vessel, MT Grace, by pirates and was then sailed away to a location in Nigeria. In that same period, the vessel MT Orfeas was boarded and highjacked at anchorage, sailed from Cote d’Iviore to Nigeria while transloading 3 thousand tons of gasoline. In 2014, the oil tanker MT Kerala was highjacked and its oil cargo was stolen. In 2016, the oil vessel Bourbon Liberty was attacked by pirates, who abducted crewmember and looted the oil cargo. In early 2021, a Nigerian pirate group, believed to be responsible for at least 5 piracy attacks, on February 6 attacked and boarded the product tanker, Sea Phantom, but fled due to incoming helicopters following Sea Phantom's distress calls. They then attacked and highjacked the fishing boat, Lianpengyu, and kidnapped its crew, and further attempted to attack the oil tanker MT Seaking, the chemical tanker Maria E, and the LPG carrier Madrid Spirit. As we now know, kidnappings in Nigeria happen quite frequently, and seems to have become a more popular piracy strategy in the last year. On 23 January 2021, the container vessel, MOZART, was attacked by pirates in the Gulf of Guinea, around São Tomé and Príncipe, resulting in one crewmember killed and 15 crewmembers kidnapped. On March 11, 2021, crew members were kidnapped from the tanker David B 220 nautical miles outside of Benin and later released. Even more recently, on May 19, 2021, five crew members were kidnapped from the fishing vessel, Atlantic Princess, by Nigerian pirates in the territory of Ghana.

=== Community of practice ===
Following Bueger, a community of practice amongst Somali pirates did encompass that “they perform the practice of piracy together”, as pirates got to collaborate and organise a collective enterprise. Hence, practices are social, as a collective share and perform practices together. In such a community of practice between pirates, a common, grand narrative is key, as it brings coherence, a sense of meaning to members, and provides a shared identity, e.g., like the coast guard narrative did for Somali pirates. The same notion of a community of practice for pirates in the Gulf of Guinea might be true, or at least between Nigerian pirates from the Niger Delta, the hot spot of piracy in the Gulf of Guinea. In the Niger Delta, militant and insurgent groups like Movement for the Emancipation of the Niger Delta and the Niger Delta Avengers have for decades been responsible for crimes such as oil-theft and sea piracy in the form of petro-piracy and more recently also kidnappings for ransom. As the Niger delta is poor and under-developed, rising discontent and social unrest are developing due to the feeling of missing out of profits of a corrupt oil-production from the oil-rich area since the 1970s. Enforced by cultism, these groups have depicted themselves as liberators of the Niger Delta by attempting to regain control of the oil resources of the region through “the struggle for what (they believed) rightfully belongs to them”.

== Root causes ==
There are many different root causes and drivers for petro-piracy. First, corruption is a major root cause and driver of petro-piracy, as well as piracy for kidnappings, in the Gulf of Guinea. Following Wawro, “corruption is increasingly understood as a threat to stability and peace, weakening public trust in the state, and fuelling the narratives of violent none-state actors.”. Corruption is linked to the region's immense amount of oil resources, making oil a resource curse where oil, through corruption, leads to poor development, economic depredation, and social unrest and conflicts due to anger and a feeling of injustice. As a result, this corruption means for instance that a very oil-rich area like the Niger Delta in Nigeria hasn't received the benefits from the heavy oil production, causing social unrest, criminal activities and militancy to rise, which consequently led to the appearance of the practice of petro-piracy, e.g. in 2008 when MEND from the Niger Delta attacked the floating oil production platform 100 km from shore in Nigeria. Therefore, corruption is a root cause for petro-piracy in the Gulf of Guinea. Adding to that, corruption makes it very difficult for a state to respond to piracy incidents, as it makes the military less effective. Nigeria and Cameroon rank 149 on Transparency International's corruption perception index, whereas the Republic of the Congo and Guinea Bissau 165, and Democratic Republic of Congo ranks 170, as some of the most corrupt countries in the world in 2020.

Apart from corruption, the black enterprise, of which petro-piracy is part of along with oil-theft and illegal fuel trading, is caused by ethno-communal ties, the geographical space of the Gulf of Guinea as a region, energy commodities, and a thriving black market for energy. First, ethnicity is a driver of the black enterprise, where “criminal collaboration is facilitated by transnational ethnic communities”, motivated by “socio-cultural and historical antecedents, due to colonial geographical delineation of Africa resulting in artificial boundaries that grouped people of the same ethnical background on opposing geographical divide”. An example of this is piracy activities along the Nigeria-Benin border with mixed nationals from the two countries in the pirate group. Second, the geographical space of the region, especially in the Niger Delta, facilitates the basis for the black enterprise, herein petro-piracy. The region's wetland, land, creeks, sea, oil, and different contestation are key. Third, energy commodities of oil and petroleum provide incentives of petro-piracy, oil-theft, and illegal fuel trading, as well as a common cause. Therefore, the lucrative oil business for profits is a very important root cause. Fourth, a flourishing black market full of demand, keeps the activities of petro-pirates and other criminals alive.

A further cause on land of petro-piracy and piracy in general in the Gulf of Guinea is environmental degradation and climate change. Here, over-fishing, oil-spills, and floods are key issues. First, illegal, unreported, and unregulated fishing and over-fishing, causing a diminishing fishing stock in the Gulf of Guinea, are in combination an immense threat to human security and national security. In the Gulf of Guinea “40 % of all fish caught… occurred illegally” which foreign companies from Japan, South Korea, Russia, Spain, France, Italy, and China are responsible for. Adding to that, decades of unregulated over-fishing has caused the fishing stock to decrease by 50%. This is worsened by a dependency on the resources of the sea, especially food in the form of fish, which is vial for millions of Africans in the Gulf of Guinea. Many former fishermen therefore turn to piracy. Second, oil-spills, especially in the Niger Delta of Nigeria, are a severe threat to human security with several millions of litres of spilt oil since 2011, destroying Africans’ means of living, e.g. farming and fishing in creeks, and their homes. This is mainly due to pipeline leaks or to sabotage. Third, floods, due to climate change, are another major cause of petro-piracy and piracy in general. Here, Nigeria is one of the most vulnerable countries to climate change in Africa, due to “its low adaptive, mitigation, and resilient capacities”. Floods have major consequences for the economy and development. In the case of Nigeria, if the sea level rise with 1 meter in the future, 75% of the Niger Delta will be flooded, potentially causing even more of its inhabitants to use petro-piracy, other piracy activities, or other criminal activities, as alternative means of living.

Other central root causes are economic deprivation and youth unemployment. First, economic deprivation with poverty, low wages and joblessness causes higher willingness to join piracy activities. Most countries experiencing piracy have an average per capita GDP lower than $2000 or has a large portion of the population living under the poverty line or high levels of unemployment. Second, because of economic deprivation, youth unemployment feeds into piracy activities as a willing force. High unemployment or not, pirates in the Gulf of Guinea are mostly young men and youth are a big part of militant groups e.g. in the Niger Delta. Many of these youth have also “been disruptive, drawing critical economic and military resources away from other areas… where piracy critically thrives”, as youth for instance have made attacks on oil productions and kidnapped oil workers in frustration from neglect.
