= List of ships attacked by Somali pirates in 2008 =

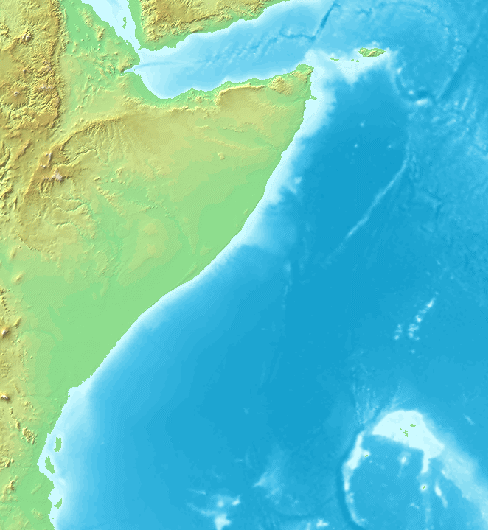
General area off the coast of Somalia where the pirates operate

Piracy off the Somali coast has threatened international shipping since the beginning of Somalia's civil war in the early 1990s. This list documents those ships attacked in 2008: for other years, see List of ships attacked by Somali pirates.

== January–March ==
Image	Flag (owner)	Name (class)	Crew (cargo)	Status	Date of attack	Coordinates
Image	Flag (owner)	Name (class)	Crew (cargo)	Status	Date of release	Ransom demanded
	Russia (Denmark)	MV Svitzer Korsakov (tugboat)	6 (none)	Released after ransom	2008-02-01	unknown
	Russia (Denmark)	MV Svitzer Korsakov (tugboat)	6 (none)	Released after ransom	2008-03-18	US$700,000
Pirates captured the Danish-owned Russian tugboat MV Svitzer Korsakov. The ship was held near the town of Eyl in Puntland. The American warship USS Carney shadowed the vessel preventing the pirates from resupplying until it was released along with its crew of six, on March 18, in exchange for a ransom of 700,000 dollars.

== April–June ==
Image	Flag (owner)	Name (class)	Crew (cargo)	Status	Date of attack	Coordinates
Image	Flag (owner)	Name (class)	Crew (cargo)	Status	Date of release	Ransom demanded
Le Ponant	France	MY Le Ponant (luxury yacht)	30 (none)	Rescued after ransom	2008-04-04	13°12′00″N 050°14′00″E
Le Ponant	France	MY Le Ponant (luxury yacht)	30 (none)	Rescued after ransom	2008-04-12	unknown
The MY Le Ponant was seized in the Gulf of Aden. The French-owned luxury yacht had no passengers on board, but there were 30 crew members: one Cameroonian, six Filipinos, 22 French, and one Ukrainian. The Commandant Bouan, a French D'Estienne d'Orves-class aviso, and HMCS Charlottetown, a Canadian Halifax-class frigate, were dispatched to the yacht. On 12 April the crew and the ship were released, apparently after the owner, CMA CGM, paid a ransom. After the crew was released, French soldiers tracked the pirates, who were then on land. According to the French military a sniper in a helicopter disabled the engine of a car transporting the pirates, while another helicopter landed and captured six pirates and recovered some ransom money. On 13 April the six appeared in a French court in Paris and were charged with, among other things, hostage-taking, hijacking, and theft.
	Spain	FV Playa de Bakio (fishing vessel)	26 (none)	Released after ransom	2008-04-20	00°06′14″S 049°08′33″E
	Spain	FV Playa de Bakio (fishing vessel)	26 (none)	Released after ransom	2008-04-26	Euro770,000
The FV Playa de Bakio was hijacked about 217 nautical miles (400 km; 250 mi) off the Somali coast at 0°6′24″S 49°8′56″E. The vessel is a Basque, Spanish-registered, tuna fishing boat. According to reports, four pirates seized the vessel and its crew of 26, made up of 13 Africans and 13 Spaniards. The boat was slightly damaged in the attack and was anchored off southeast Puntland by the hijackers. The Spanish government dispatched the Álvaro de Bazán-class frigate Méndez Núñez to the area, and put a team of combat divers on alert, but claimed to be seeking a diplomatic solution. The vessel moved along the coast as local officials sent security forces to chase away the pirates. On 26 April the ship and its crew were freed and the Méndez Núñez escorted the ship to safety. The Spaniards arrived in Spain on 30 April from the Seychelles, where the African members of the crew remained. It is alleged that a 1.2 million-United States dollar ransom was paid, which the Spanish government denies paying. It is possible that the owner of the ship paid a ransom.
	United Arab Emirates	MV Al-Khaleej (unknown)	16 (unknown)	Rescued	2008-04-21	unknown
	United Arab Emirates	MV Al-Khaleej (unknown)	16 (unknown)	Rescued	2008-04-22	unknown
The MV Al-Khaleej, a United Arab Emirates-flagged cargo ship was seized, along with its 16-member Pakistani crew, by pirates off the coast of Bosaso. The next day, Puntland security forces stormed the ship, capturing seven of the hijackers, killing one, and freeing the ship and its crew. On 30 April, a Puntland court sentenced the seven, as well as four collaborators detained after the raid, to life in prison.
	Jordan (United Arab Emirates)	MV Victoria (unknown)	12 (unknown)	Released	2008-05-17	02°13′11″N 046°49′22″E
	Jordan (United Arab Emirates)	MV Victoria (unknown)	12 (unknown)	Released	2008-05-23	unknown
The MV Victoria, a Jordanian-flagged vessel owned by an Emirati company was hijacked 30 nautical miles (56 km; 35 mi) off the Somali coast at 2°13′19″N 46°49′38″E. The ship was travelling to the Somali capital of Mogadishu and had a crew of 12 from Bangladesh, India, Pakistan, and Tanzania. On May 23 the ship was released on unspecified terms and continued on its course to Mogadishu, accompanied by Somali soldiers on board. Also on 23 May, after the release of the ship, Islamic militants attacked pirates in Hobyo, apparently in response for the hijacking. According to an Islamist leader, four pirates and two militants were killed in the attack and six pirates were captured.
	Antigua and Barbuda (Netherlands)	MV Amiya Scan (unknown)	9 (damaged oil platform)	Released	2008-05-25	13°16′22″N 050°49′47″E
	Antigua and Barbuda (Netherlands)	MV Amiya Scan (unknown)	9 (damaged oil platform)	Released	2008-06-24	none
The MV Amiya Scan, a Dutch vessel manned by four Russians and five Filipinos was hijacked in the Gulf of Aden. The ship flies the flag of Antigua and Barbuda and is owned by the Dutch company Reider Shipping. It left the Kenyan port of Mombasa on May 19 and was headed to the Romanian port of Constanţa. The ship was transporting a damaged oil platform. The vessel was released on June 24 and sailed out of the port of Eyl. Once far enough from the coast, the ship transmitted a mayday signal, as two crew members were ill and the ship had no supplies. The German Bremen-class frigate Emden responded to the mayday call with medical aid and supplies. The ship was further aided by a ship that Reider Shipping had contracted to assist it.
MV Lehmann Timber	Germany	MV Lehmann Timber (cargo ship)	15 (unknown)	Released after ransom	2008-05-28	13°10′11″N 048°58′46″E
MV Lehmann Timber	Germany	MV Lehmann Timber (cargo ship)	15 (unknown)	Released after ransom	2008-07-08	US$750,000
The MV Lehmann Timber, a German dry cargo ship, was captured on its maiden trip in the Gulf of Aden. The crew of 9 Burmese, 4 Ukrainians, 1 Russian and 1 Estonian were taken captive. The ship was released 41 days later, on 8 July, after a ransom of US$750,000 was delivered to the pirates near the town of Eyl. After the release, the American destroyer USS Momsen provided supplies and support to the vessel, as an engine failure caused it to drift for five days in a heavy storm, until it was towed to Salalah, Oman on 21 July.
	Taiwan	MV YM Ocean (container ship)	unknown (unknown)	Capture failed	2008-06-03	12°43′18″N 049°51′30″E
	Taiwan	MV YM Ocean (container ship)	unknown (unknown)	Capture failed	Capture failed	none
One of Canada's Sea King helicopters, embarked in HMCS Calgary, intervened in an ongoing piracy attack on a commercial vessel, YM Ocean transiting the Gulf of Aden, approximately 65 nautical miles off the coast of Somalia. The Halifax-class frigate Calgary, one of three Canadian warships currently assigned to Operation Altair, Canada's maritime contribution to the campaign against terrorism, was operating in the area when a broken call for assistance was heard from a vessel apparently under attack by small arms fire. Calgary immediately altered course and increased speed to close the scene. Her airborne Sea King was promptly redirected towards the area and tasked to gather information on the situation. The helicopter's arrival in the vicinity of the attack did not go unnoticed by the perpetrators. Two small boats, commonly referred to as skiffs, were observed in the area and appeared to be armed. "I am convinced that the presence of our aircraft drove them away from the traffic lanes and prevented any further attack today on merchant shipping in the area," said Commander Kelly Larkin, commanding officer of the multi-purpose frigate. "We continued to monitor those two skiffs and their crew as they were heading back towards Somalia territorial waters."

== July–August ==
Image	Flag (owner)	Name (class)	Crew (cargo)	Status	Date of attack	Coordinates
Image	Flag (owner)	Name (class)	Crew (cargo)	Status	Date of release	Ransom demanded
	Panama (Japan)	MV Stella Maris (bulk carrier)	21 (unknown)	Released after ransom	2008-07-20	13°16′59″N 050°03′28″E
	Panama (Japan)	MV Stella Maris (bulk carrier)	21 (unknown)	Released after ransom	2008-09-26	US$2,000,000
Pirates seized the MV Stella Maris, a Japanese bulk carrier, flying the flag of Panama along with its 21 crew members. The ship was released along with its crew on 26 September after a ransom of US$2 million was paid.
	Singapore	MV Gem of Kilakarai (cargo ship)	unknown (unknown)	Capture failed	2008-08-08	13°12′00″N 049°56′00″E
	Singapore	MV Gem of Kilakarai (cargo ship)	unknown (unknown)	Capture failed	Capture failed	none
The Singaporean cargo ship, the MV Gem of Kilakarai, was attacked by pirates in two vessels who fired grenades at it, but the attack was thwarted by the arrival of helicopters from the American warship USS Peleliu.
	Thailand	MV Thor Star (cargo ship)	28 (plywood)	Released after ransom	2008-08-12	13°38′48″N 049°45′8″E
	Thailand	MV Thor Star (cargo ship)	28 (plywood)	Released after ransom	2008-10-00	unknown
The MV Thor Star, a Thai cargo ship with a 28-member crew was seized when it was delivering plywood to Aden, Yemen. It was released in October after a ransom was paid.
	Nigeria	MV Yenegoa Ocean (tugboat)	unknown (none)	Released	2008-08-04	unknown
	Nigeria	MV Yenegoa Ocean (tugboat)	unknown (none)	Released	2009-06-06	unknown
The Nigerian tugboat MT Yenegoa Ocean was hijacked.
	Malaysia	MV Bunga Melati Dua (oil tanker)	39 (32,000 tonnes of crude palm oil)	Released after ransom	2008-08-19	12°46′24″N 47°55′28″E
	Malaysia	MV Bunga Melati Dua (oil tanker)	39 (32,000 tonnes of crude palm oil)	Released after ransom	2008-09-29	US$2,000,000
The MV Bunga Melati Dua, a Malaysian palm oil tanker owned by MISC Berhad, and its crew of 29 Malaysians and ten Filipinos was hijacked by pirates in two speedboats. One Filipino crew member was killed during the boarding.
	Antigua and Barbuda (Germany)	MV BBC Trinidad (unknown)	13 (unknown)	Released after ransom	2008-08-21	12°57′9″N 48°56′7″E
	Antigua and Barbuda (Germany)	MV BBC Trinidad (unknown)	13 (unknown)	Released after ransom	2008-09-11	US$1,100,000
The German-owned, Antigua and Barbuda-flagged MV BBC Trinidad was hijacked. It was released on 11 September, along with its 13-person crew consisting of a Slovak captain, ten Filipinos, and two Russians, after a ransom of US$1.1 million is paid. The ship was held near the town of Eyl.
	Japan	MV Irene (unknown)	19 (unknown)	Released after ransom	2008-08-21	14°26′42″N 49°56′46″E
	Japan	MV Irene (unknown)	19 (unknown)	Released after ransom	2008-09-00	US$1,500,000
The MV Irene, a Japanese-owned with a crew of one Serb, two Croatians and 16 Filipinos was seized. It was released around the same time as the MV BBC Trinidad, after a ransom of US$1.5 million was paid. The ship was held near the town of Eyl.
	Iran	MV Iran Deyanat (unknown)	29 (mined minerals)	Released	2008-08-21	13°49′3″N 50°23′9″E
	Iran	MV Iran Deyanat (unknown)	29 (mined minerals)	Released	Released	unknown
The MV Iran Deyanat was hijacked and brought to Eyl. The Iranian-owned ship and its crew of 14 Iranians, three Indians, two Filipinos, and 10 Eastern Europeans, possibly Croatian, were being held for ransom. The pirates have since suffered health problems including hair loss and even death, suggesting that the vessel could have been carrying chemical munitions or radioactive materials.
	Malaysia	MV Bunga Melati 5 (chemical tanker)	41 (30,000 tonnes of petrochemicals)	Released after ransom	2008-08-29	13°12′00″N 46°37′00″E
	Malaysia	MV Bunga Melati 5 (chemical tanker)	41 (30,000 tonnes of petrochemicals)	Released after ransom	2008-09-27	US$2,000,000
The MV Bunga Melati 5, a Malaysian tanker owned by MISC Berhad, was captured while transporting petrochemicals from Singapore to Saudi Arabia. The vessel and crew of its 36 Malaysians and five Filipinos were released on 27 September after a ransom of US$2 million was paid.

== September ==
Image	Flag (owner)	Name (class)	Crew (cargo)	Status	Date of attack	Coordinates
Image	Flag (owner)	Name (class)	Crew (cargo)	Status	Date of release	Ransom demanded
	France	Carré d'As IV (yacht)	2 (none)	Rescued	2008-09-02	11°48′41″N 50°32′00″E
	France	Carré d'As IV (yacht)	2 (none)	Rescued	2008-09-16	€1,000,000
The Carré d'As IV, a 50-foot (15 m) yacht, was hijacked and its two occupants, a French couple, were taken captive. The pirates demanded a million euros in ransom, and the liberation of six Somalis captured during the Le Ponant incident. On 16 September, French commando frogmen from the Commando Hubert unit, operating from the frigate Courbet, stormed the yacht as it was being taken to Eyl. The two captives were freed, while one pirate was killed and six captured.
	Panama (Egypt)	MV Al Mansourah (cargo ship)	25 (unknown)	Released	2008-09-03	14°27′00″N 049°40′00″E
	Panama (Egypt)	MV Al Mansourah (cargo ship)	25 (unknown)	Released	2008-09-26	unknown
Twelve pirates armed with automatic rifles and RPGs in a small high speed craft attacked, boarded and hijacked the ship along with 25 crewmembers. They stole the crew's personal belongings and cash. The ship was ultimately released on 26 September 2009, and it was last reported that the ship was back in international waters en route to Egypt. It is not clear if a ransom was paid, but it appears that the pirates had requested a ransom in the negotiations with the Egyptian intelligence officials.
	South Korea	MV Bright Ruby (bulk carrier)	21 (unknown)	Released after ransom	2008-09-10	13°09′03″N 047°57′00″E
	South Korea	MV Bright Ruby (bulk carrier)	21 (unknown)	Released after ransom	2008-10-16	unknown
Pirates boarded and hijacked the 26,589 DWT ship underway and 21 crewmembers, 14 Burmese and 8 Koreans, were held hostage. The ship was released on 16 October 2008 after a ransom was paid by the owner, J&J Trust.
	Hong Kong (Japan)	MT Stolt Valor (chemical tanker)	22 (23,818 tonnes of base oils and chemicals)	Released after ransom	2008-09-15	13°34′54″N 049°09′45″E
	Hong Kong (Japan)	MT Stolt Valor (chemical tanker)	22 (23,818 tonnes of base oils and chemicals)	Released after ransom	2008-11-16	Between US$1-2.5 million
The MT Stolt Valor, a Japanese-owned, Hong Kong-flagged ship carrying 23,818 tonnes of oil products on delivery to Asia was seized by pirates. The captain and his men were unharmed. After two months of ransom negotiations in Hong Kong, the ship and 22 crew members from India, the Philippines, Bangladesh, and Russia were released.
	Denmark	MV Torm Freya (tanker)	unknown (unknown)	Capture failed	2008-09-18	06°40′00″S 039°35′00″E
	Denmark	MV Torm Freya (tanker)	unknown (unknown)	Capture failed	Capture failed	none
Six pirates boarded the tanker drifting. They broke into the forward store and stole the ship's stores. The alarm was raised and crew mustered. The pirates jumped overboard and escaped in a waiting small craft.
MV Centauri	Malta (Greece)	MV Centauri (bulk carrier)	25 (17,000 tons of salt)	Released	2008-09-18	02°22′22″N 050°55′15″E
MV Centauri	Malta (Greece)	MV Centauri (bulk carrier)	25 (17,000 tons of salt)	Released	2008-11-27	unknown
Armed with rocket launchers, five pirates in three speedboats boarded and hijacked the MV Centauri on 18 September. All 25 crew members were Filipino.
	Bahamas (Greece)	MV Captain Stephanos (freighter)	19 (coal)	Released	2008-09-21	02°30′00″N 051°59′30″E
	Bahamas (Greece)	MV Captain Stephanos (freighter)	19 (coal)	Released	2008-12-08	unknown
The MV Captain Stephanos, owned by Chart World Shipping Corporation, with a crew of 17 Filipinos, 1 Chinese, and 1 Ukrainian was hijacked. Four machine-gun wielding pirates captured the ship on 21 September 2008 while it was transporting coal.
MV Faina	Belize (Ukraine)	MV Faina (cargo ship)	21 (33 Soviet-made T-72 tanks, weapons, ammunition)	Released after ransom	2008-09-25	02°10′00″N 050°40′00″E
MV Faina	Belize (Ukraine)	MV Faina (cargo ship)	21 (33 Soviet-made T-72 tanks, weapons, ammunition)	Released after ransom	2009-02-05	US$3,200,000
The MV Faina, a Ukrainian-owned, Belize-flagged ship carrying 33 T-72 tanks on delivery to Kenya was seized by pirates. The captain had reported that he had been surrounded by three boats. The frigate Neustrashimy of Russia's Baltic Fleet and the USS Howard were dispatched to Somalia's coast. The pirates had initially demanded US$35,000,000 for Faina's release, but they lowered their demand to US$20,000,000, US$8,000,000, US$5,000,000, and US$3,500,000 in the months that the ship has been held hostage. After five months of being held hostage the ship and crew of Faina were released after a ransom of US$3,200,000 was paid. The ship was released on 5 February 2009 and her remaining crew of 20 were reported by the Ukrainian presidency as being healthy and safe.
	Liberia (Greece)	MV Genius (chemical tanker)	19 (unknown)	Released	2008-09-26	13°32′13″N 048°36′21″E
	Liberia (Greece)	MV Genius (chemical tanker)	19 (unknown)	Released	2008-11-22	unknown
The 6,765 DWT MV Genius was headed to the United Arab Emirates from Romania when it was captured with 19 crewmembers aboard. The ship is owned by Mare Maritime Co. SA., and was released on November 22. Despite reports that the board was released after a ransom payment a Greek Ministry of Merchant Marine and Island Policy spokesman failed to confirm or deny the news saying that "We know nothing about it."

== October–December ==
Image	Flag (owner)	Name (class)	Crew (cargo)	Status	Date of attack	Coordinates
Image	Flag (owner)	Name (class)	Crew (cargo)	Status	Date of release	Ransom demanded
	Panama (unknown)	MV Wael (freighter)	11 (cement)	Rescued	2008-10-09	unknown
	Panama (unknown)	MV Wael (freighter)	11 (cement)	Rescued	2008-10-14	none
The MV Wael had a crew of 9 Syrians and 2 Somalis when it was captured transporting cement from Oman to Bosaso, Somalia. On 12 October 2008, Somali security forces engaged in a shoot-out with the pirates, resulting in a death of a pirate and of a Somali soldier. The security forces also captured two pirate speedboats. Two days later, Somali forces liberated the ship, and 10 hijackers were arrested.
	Panama (Greece)	MV Action (chemical tanker)	20 (unknown)	Released	2008-10-10	unknown
	Panama (Greece)	MV Action (chemical tanker)	20 (unknown)	Released	2008-12-12	unknown
A chemical tanker with a crew of 20, initially reported to be a Greek ship flying under a Panamanian flag, was hijacked in the Gulf of Aden. Greek authorities did not confirm affiliation with the ship. Three crew members died due to unknown circumstances while the ship was in the hands of the pirates.
	Panama (South Korea)	MT African Sanderling (bulk carrier)	21 (unknown)	Released	2008-10-15	unknown
	Panama (South Korea)	MT African Sanderling (bulk carrier)	21 (unknown)	Released	2009-01-13	US$2,000,000
The 58,980 DWT MT African Sanderling carrying a crew of 21 Filipinos and unknown cargo was hijacked. The ship was released on 13 January 2009.
	Marshall Islands (Turkey)	MV Yasa Neslihan (bulk carrier)	20 (iron ore)	Released	2008-10-29	unknown
	Marshall Islands (Turkey)	MV Yasa Neslihan (bulk carrier)	20 (iron ore)	Released	2009-01-06	unknown
The Turkish ship MV Yasa Neslihan was hijacked. The vessel with a crew of 20 was carrying iron ore from Canada to China. The ship's owning company, Yasa Holding, was alerted by an on-board alarm system. Turkish authorities sought help to rescue the ship, but were unable to make contact with the pirates. On 6 January 2009 the ship was released, Andrew Mwangura, East Africa's Coordinator of Seafarers Assistance Program said "Gunmen have released one of the three Turkish ships. The vessel was released on Tuesday and I'm not sure whether ransom was paid".
	Bahamas (Denmark)	MV CEC Future (unknown)	13 (unknown)	Released	2008-11-07	unknown
	Bahamas (Denmark)	MV CEC Future (unknown)	13 (unknown)	Released	2009-01-15	US$ 1 - 2,000,000
The Danish-owned, Bahamas-registered ship MV CEC Future carrying unknown cargo was seized with 13 crew members, consisting of 11 Russians, 1 Georgian, and 1 Lithuanian. The ship was released on 15 January 2009 after extensive negotiations with the Clipper Group CEO Per Gullstrup and the owners, Danish shipping company Clipper Group, airdropped a ransom of 1.7 million US dollars.
A person has been indicted for negotiating the ransom, and charged with 4 counts of piracy.
	Philippines (Panama)	MV Stolt Strength (chemical tanker)	23 (phosphoric acid)	Released	2008-11-10	unknown
	Philippines (Panama)	MV Stolt Strength (chemical tanker)	23 (phosphoric acid)	Released	Released	unknown
The Filipino chemical tanker MV Stolt Strength, carrying phosphoric acid, was hijacked with 23 crew members On 21 April 2009, the ship and crew were released. The Stolt Strength may have been used as a "mothership" in the interim.
	India	MV Jag Arnav (bulk carrier)	unknown (unknown)	Capture failed	2008-11-11	unknown
	India	MV Jag Arnav (bulk carrier)	unknown (unknown)	Capture failed	Capture failed	none
MV Jag Arnav, 38,265-tonne bulk carrier owned by Mumbai-based Great Eastern Shipping Company, raised an alarm when pirates tried to board the ship. The Indian Navy's INS Tabar, which about 25 nautical miles (46 km; 29 mi) away at the time of the distress call, rushed a Chetak helicopter carrying a team of MARCOS to the scene and successfully thwarted the hijack attempt. The incident took place 60 nautical miles (110 km; 69 mi) from Aden.
	Saudi Arabia	MV Timaha (cargo ship)	unknown (unknown)	Capture failed	2008-11-11	unknown
	Saudi Arabia	MV Timaha (cargo ship)	unknown (unknown)	Capture failed	Capture failed	none
The Indian Navy's INS Tabar foiled an attempt by pirates to a board MV Timaha, a Saudi Arabian-registered cargo ship. This was the second attack the Indian Navy foiled in a single day.
	Denmark	MV Powerful (cargo ship)	unknown (unknown)	Capture failed	2008-11-11	unknown
	Denmark	MV Powerful (cargo ship)	unknown (unknown)	Capture failed	Capture failed	none
The MV Powerful, a Danish-registered cargo ship, was attacked by pirates on board a dhow. Russia has claimed that the pirates tried twice to seize the vessel, but they were rebuffed by Russian and British helicopters, though Russian involvement has been disputed by the Royal Navy. The dhow was later detected by HMS Cumberland, and its unit of Royal Marines was dispatched in rigid-raider craft to try to stop the dhow. Whilst circling the dhow, the Marines were fired upon by the pirates. The Marines returned fire, killing two pirates, and forcing the remaining crew to surrender. The dhow was then boarded and captured by the Marines. A Yemini male was found on board, and he later died from his injuries; the British Ministry of Defence reported that it was unsure whether the injuries were caused during the gunfight, or beforehand.
	Turkey	MV Karagöl (oil/chemical tanker)	14 (4,500 tons of unspecified chemicals)	Released (possibly ransomed), 13 January 2009	2008-11-12	unknown
	Turkey	MV Karagöl (oil/chemical tanker)	14 (4,500 tons of unspecified chemicals)	Released (possibly ransomed), 13 January 2009	Released (possibly ransomed), 13 January 2009	unknown
The Turkish ship Karagöl, owned by the Istanbul-based Turkish shipping company YDC Denizcilik A.Ş, was hijacked off the coast of Yemen with 14 crew members aboard. Notably the second Turkish vessel to be hijacked in a matter of two weeks, the ship was reported to be carrying 4,500 tons of unspecified chemicals, en route to Mumbai. Despite no official word on the nationality of the hijackers has been released, the Turkish media response was towards pirates of Somali identity. The vessel was subsequently released, possibly as a result of a ransom payment, on 13 January 2009.
FV Tianyu No. 8	China	FV Tianyu No. 8 (fishing vessel)	unknown (unknown)	Released	2008-11-14	unknown
FV Tianyu No. 8	China	FV Tianyu No. 8 (fishing vessel)	unknown (unknown)	Released	2009-02-08	unknown
The Chinese fishing vessel Tianyu No. 8 or Tanyo 8 was seized by Somali pirates while fishing off the coast of Kenya. The ship was released on 8 February 2009 with 24 crew members safely on board.
	unknown	unknown (chemical tanker)	unknown (unknown)	Capture failed	2008-11-14	unknown
	unknown	unknown (chemical tanker)	unknown (unknown)	Capture failed	Capture failed	none
The British private security service Anti-Piracy Maritime Security Solutions claimed to have repulsed an attack on an unidentified chemical tanker using water hoses and a magneto-acoustic device.
	Panama (Japan)	MV Chemstar Venus (oil/chemical tanker)	23 (unknown)	Released after ransom	2008-11-15	unknown
	Panama (Japan)	MV Chemstar Venus (oil/chemical tanker)	23 (unknown)	Released after ransom	2009-02-12	unknown
The crew of the 19,455 DWT MV Chemstar Venus consisted of 18 Filipinos and 5 South Koreans. The ship was travelling from Indonesia to Ukraine when it was hijacked. The ship was released on 12 February 2009 after a ransom was paid via a tug boat.
MV Sirius Star	Liberia (Saudi Arabia)	MV Sirius Star (oil tanker)	25 (2,000,000 barrels (320,000 m3) of crude oil)	Released after ransom	2008-11-15	4°41′0″S 48°43′0″E
MV Sirius Star	Liberia (Saudi Arabia)	MV Sirius Star (oil tanker)	25 (2,000,000 barrels (320,000 m3) of crude oil)	Released after ransom	Released after ransom	US$15,000,000
The Liberian-flagged ship MV Sirius Star owned by the Saudi oil company Aramco, was hijacked 450 nautical miles (830 km; 520 mi) southeast of Mombasa, Kenya with 25 crew members aboard. The 330 m (1,082 ft 8 in) vessel was carrying crude oil valued at US$100 million. At the time this was the farthest Somali pirates have travelled to hijack a ship, and took place far south of the "Maritime Security Patrol Area" patrolled by international warships in the Gulf of Aden. Sirius Star's captors threatened that the ship would face "disastrous" consequences if a US$25,000,000 ransom was not paid, though they have agreed to accept US$15,000,000 to release the ship. On 11 January 2009 the body of a Somali pirate who drowned just after receiving a huge ransom washed onshore with $153,000 in cash, a resident said Sunday, as the spokesman for another group of pirates promised to soon free a Ukrainian arms ship. Five pirates drowned when their small boat capsized after they received a reported $3 million ransom for releasing a Saudi oil tanker. Local resident Omar Abdi Hassan said one of the bodies had been found on a beach near the coastal town of Haradhere and relatives were searching for the other four.
	Hong Kong (Iran)	MV Delight (bulk carrier)	25 (36,000 tons of wheat)	Released	2008-11-18	14°23′0″N 51°5′0″E
	Hong Kong (Iran)	MV Delight (bulk carrier)	25 (36,000 tons of wheat)	Released	2009-01-10	unknown
The Hong Kong-registered but Iranian run cargo ship MV Delight carrying 36,000 tons of wheat is hijacked near Yemen coast in Gulf of Aden along with 25 crew members. The vessel was carrying 7 Indians, and sailors from Iran, the Philippines, Pakistan and Guyana. This ship was released on 10 January 2009.
	Kiribati (Thailand)	FV Ekawat Nava 5 (fishing vessel)	16 (fishing equipment)	Destroyed	2008-11-18	unknown
	Kiribati (Thailand)	FV Ekawat Nava 5 (fishing vessel)	16 (fishing equipment)	Destroyed	Destroyed	none
A suspected pirate "mothership" which turned out to be the Kiribati-flagged Thai-owned FV Ekawat Nava 5 with a crew of 15 Thais and 1 Cambodian that was transporting fishing equipment from Oman to Yemen. The ship was apparently in the process of being hijacked when the pirates threatened and then fired upon Indian naval vessel. The INS Tabar fired back in self defence, destroying the ship. One sailor was confirmed dead, while another survived; the fate of the 14 others on the ship are not known. The surviving sailor reportedly told the owner of the FV Ekawat Nava 5, Sirichai Fisheries, how the events unfolded.
	Yemen	MV Adina/MV Amani /MV Arena/MV Erina (cargo ship)	7 (570 tonnes of steel)	Released without ransom	2008-11-19	unknown
	Yemen	MV Adina/MV Amani /MV Arena/MV Erina (cargo ship)	7 (570 tonnes of steel)	Released without ransom	2008-12-03	US$2,000,000
Owned by Abu Talal, the MV Adina, also reported as the MV Amani, MV Arena or MV Erina, had a crew of 3 Somalis, 2 Yemenis and 2 Panamanians when it was captured. The ship was transporting a cargo of steel from Mukalla to Socotra. Security forces in Puntland, Somalia said they would storm the ship. Ali Abdi Aware, a minister in Puntland, said, "We will release the hijacked Yemen ship forcibly if they do not release it without a ransom because we have good relations with Yemen...Now we are preparing our troops." Following negotiation with the Somali leaders, the pirates released the ship without receiving payment of the $2 million ransom that they had demanded.
	Liberia (Marshall Islands)	MV Biscaglia (chemical tanker)	27 (Palm oil)	Released	2008-11-28	unknown
	Liberia (Marshall Islands)	MV Biscaglia (chemical tanker)	27 (Palm oil)	Released	2009-01-24	unknown
The ship was managed by Singapore-based Ishima, but was owned by a shipping company based out of the Marshall Islands. The MV Biscaglia came under heavy fire from pirates early on November 28. The vessel then called for assistance from nearby NATO forces. There were three ex-British service members hired as security on board the vessel, and they fought for sometime using non lethal tactics against the pirates. Despite the resistance put up by the small security force, the pirates overpowered the men, and to escape the pirates they jumped into the water. But even after they jumped off the ship, the pirates kept firing at the men and turned the ship to try to run over the men. The trio were rescued by a German helicopter launched from the frigate Mecklenburg-Vorpommern that was part of the NATO forces, and then flown to the French frigate Nivôse, before being transferred to HMS Cumberland. The ship was released on 24 January, with the remaining crew reported as being in good health.
MS Astor	Bahamas (Germany)	MS Astor (cruise ship)	300 (492 passengers)	Capture failed	2008-11-28	unknown
MS Astor	Bahamas (Germany)	MS Astor (cruise ship)	300 (492 passengers)	Capture failed	Capture failed	none
Transocean Tours' cruise ship was approached by two pirate speedboats while on the Gulf of Oman, en route from Sharm-al-Sheikh to Dubai, but the pirate boats were chased off by the German frigate Mecklenburg-Vorpommern.
MS Nautica	Marshall Islands (United States)	MS Nautica (cruise ship)	386 (684 passengers)	Capture failed	2008-11-30	unknown
MS Nautica	Marshall Islands (United States)	MS Nautica (cruise ship)	386 (684 passengers)	Capture failed	Capture failed	none
Oceania Cruises' premium cruise ship attacked by two skiffs hiding amongst fishing vessels while traversing the Maritime Safety Protection Area on the Gulf of Aden. The Nautica was able to escape with passengers and crew uninjured, despite eight shots that were fired on the ship by the pirates.
	Portugal (Cyprus)	MS Athena (cruise ship)	unknown (unknown)	Not captured	2008-12-03	12°59′29″N 47°41′33″E
	Portugal (Cyprus)	MS Athena (cruise ship)	unknown (unknown)	Not captured	Not captured	unknown
On 3 December 2008, Athena was attacked in the Gulf of Aden by up to 29 pirate boats. Water cannon were used to repel the pirates and the ship was not boarded.
	Ethiopia	MV Gibe (cargo ship)	25 (unknown)	Capture failed	2008-12-13	13°32′36″N 48°37′30″E
	Ethiopia	MV Gibe (cargo ship)	25 (unknown)	Capture failed	Capture failed	none
On 13 December 2008, INS Mysore (a Delhi-class destroyer of the Indian Navy) captured 23 sea pirates along with arms and ammunition when the pirates were trying to capture MV Gibe, a ship sailing under the Ethiopian flag.
	[[|]] (Malaysia)	MV Masindra 7 (tugboat)	11 (unknown)	Released after Ransom	2008-12-16	13°54′0″N 49°39′0″E
	[[|]] (Malaysia)	MV Masindra 7 (tugboat)	11 (unknown)	Released after Ransom	2009-08-01	unknown
Pirates hijacked a Malaysian tugboat used by French oil company Total off Yemen. The tugboat also had a submerged barge attached to it known as ADM1, and one of the generators on the tugboat was defective causing a number of issues for the captured crew.
MV Bosphorus Prodigy	Antigua and Barbuda (Turkey)	MV Bosphorus Prodigy (cargo ship)	11 (unknown)	Released	2008-12-16	13°20′49″N 47°57′38″E
MV Bosphorus Prodigy	Antigua and Barbuda (Turkey)	MV Bosphorus Prodigy (cargo ship)	11 (unknown)	Released	2009-02-02	unknown
A 100 metres (328 ft 1 in) cargo ship belonging to an Istanbul-based shipping company had also been hijacked. The ship and crew were released on 2 February 2009 after a seven-week captivity.
	China	MV Zhenhua 4 (cargo ship)	30 (unknown)	Capture failed	2008-12-17	14°28′0″N 51°36′0″E
	China	MV Zhenhua 4 (cargo ship)	30 (unknown)	Capture failed	Capture failed	none
A Chinese fishing boat owned by China Communications Construction was hijacked on the way back to Shanghai, but deterred as crews radioed for help. The 30 crew members fought for four hours after nine pirates armed with rocket launchers and heavy machine guns boarded the ship. A Malaysian warship, Sri Indera Sakti and Malaysian military helicopter arrived and fired on the pirates, who fled the scene. No crew members were injured. The crew used water cannons, molotov cocktails and beer bottles to defend against the pirates, whom were fully armed.
