= MV Karagöl =

Turkish oil/chemical tanker

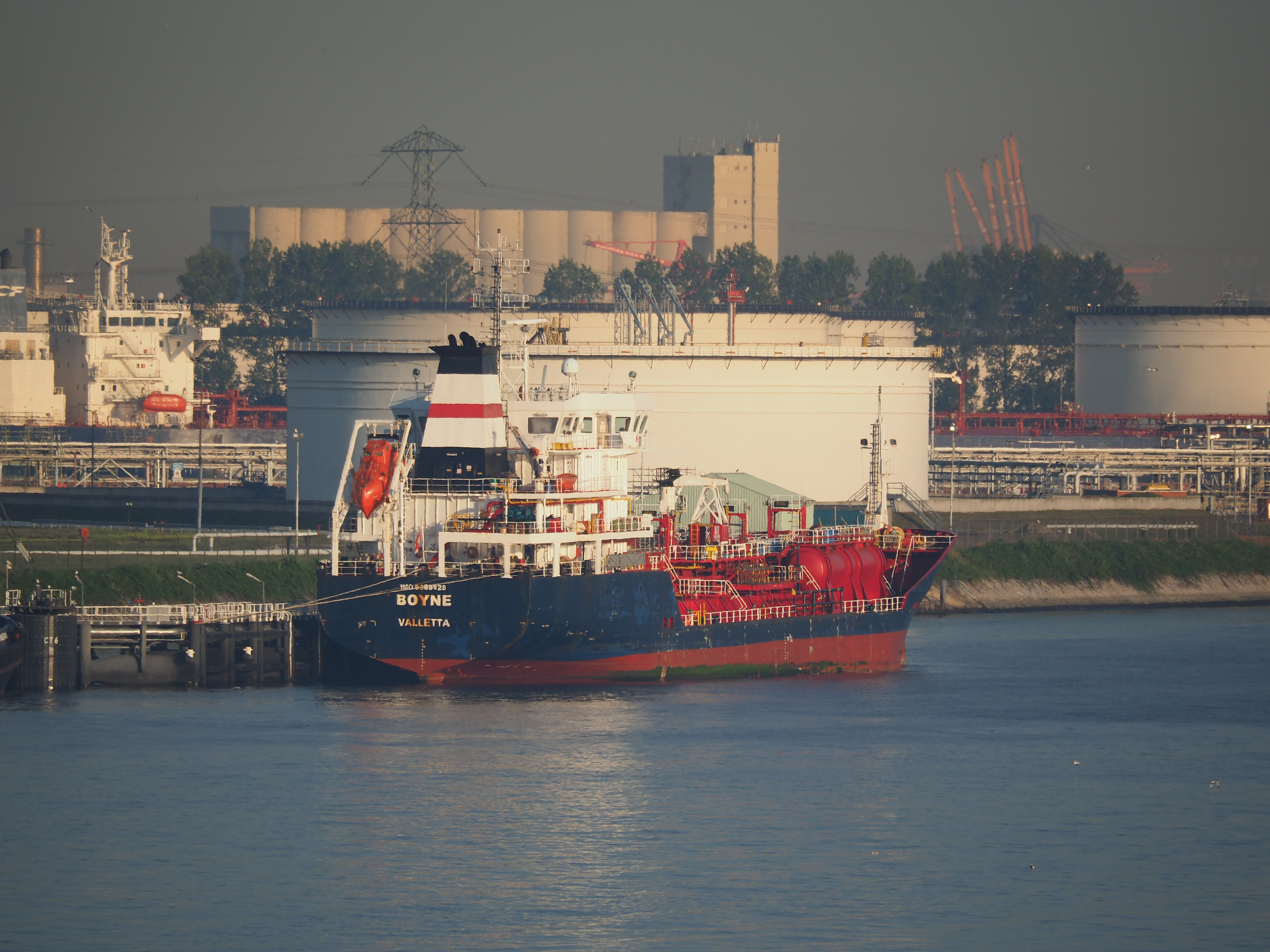
- Karagöl as Boyne in 2020

History
- Name: Karagöl; Nazlım (previous)
- Owner: YDC Denizcilik A.Ş., Istanbul, Turkey
- Operator: YDC Denizcilik A.Ş.
- Port of registry: Turkey
- Builder: Dearsan Shipyard Tuzla, Istanbul, Turkey
- Launched: July 18, 2006
- Completed: August 3, 2007
- Home port: Istanbul, Turkey
- Identification: IMO number: 9369928
- Captured: November 12, 2008
- Status: Released (possibly ransomed); January 13, 2009

General characteristics
- Class & type: IMO II type Oil/Chemical tanker
- Tonnage: 5,850 GT
- Displacement: 6,585 long tons (6,691 t)
- Length: 105.50 m (346 ft 2 in) LOA; 99.35 m (325 ft 11 in) LBP
- Beam: 16.80 m (55 ft 1 in)
- Draught: 6.29 m (20 ft 8 in)
- Depth: 7.40 m (24 ft 3 in)
- Ice class: IC
- Speed: 13.0 knots (24.1 km/h; 15.0 mph) (avg)
- Capacity: 4,420 m^{3} (156,000 cu ft)
- Crew: 14

MV Karagöl is an oil/chemical tanker owned and operated by the Istanbul based Turkish company YDC Denizcilik A.Ş. (YDC Maritime Co.), sailing under Turkish flag. The marine company is also partnered by the ruling AK Party's Istanbul deputy Hasan Kemal Yardımcı.

On November 12, 2008, the ship was captured by Somali pirates in the thirty-fifth such attack in 2008. The Karagöl's crew (at the time of capture) consisted of 14 Turks. The vessel was subsequently released, possibly as a result of a ransom payment, on 13 January 2009.

== Hijacking ==
On November 12, 2008, the Karagöl was hijacked 16 nmi (30 km) off the coast of Yemen near the Horn of Africa. The ship was allegedly heading to Mumbai, India transporting 4,500 tons of chemical of unknown substance.

Following a message received from the ship's crew that they were attacked by pirates, Turkish authorities informed British warships patrolling in the region as part of a NATO mission about the incident. NATO forces were asked by the Turkish government to intervene.

The Karagöl is the second Turkish-owned vessel hijacked in the area within two weeks after MV Yasa Neslihan, and the second chemical tanker seized within two days, following the Philippines-flagged MV Stolt Strength.

Kubilay Marangoz, a lawyer of the ship-owner, said in an interview that "Our hands are tied. We have nothing to do at the moment. We are in contact with the pirates. They have demanded ransom. We are negotiating with them." He did not disclose the amount of the ransom demanded.

The vessel was released by the hijackers by January 13, 2009. The crew and cargo were reported to be safe.
