= MV Straitsman =

MV Straitsman may refer to:

- MV Straitsman (1972), a livestock carrier
- MV Straitsman (2005), a passenger and vehicle ferry
