= Straitsman =

Straitsman may refer to:

- MV Straitsman (2005), former Danish ferry in New Zealand
- MV Straitsman (1972), capsized 1974
