= BornholmerFærgen =

Danish ferry company

- Founded: 1866
- Defunct: 2018
- Fate: Acquired and merged with Molslinjen
- Successor: Bornholmslinjen
- Headquarters: Rønne, Denmark
- Area served: Baltic Sea
- Key people: Board director: John Steen-Mikkelsen; Board member: Per Gullestrup. Board member: Steen E. Christensen. Board member: Roar B. Schou. Board member: Christian Hassel.
- Services: Passenger transportation Freight transportation
- Parent: Færgen A/S
- Website: www.bornholmerfærgen.dk

BornholmerFærgen Routes

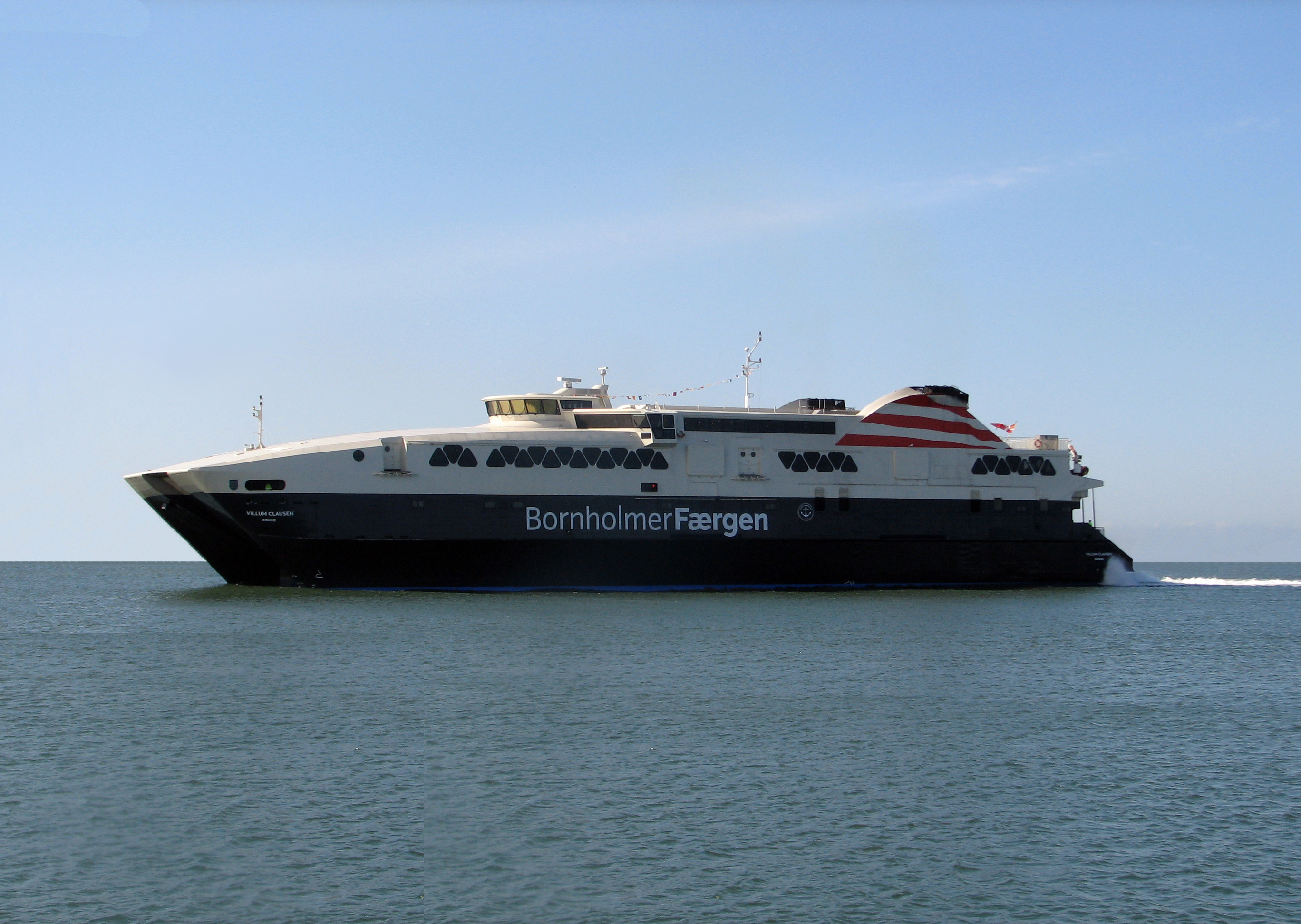
Villum Clausen

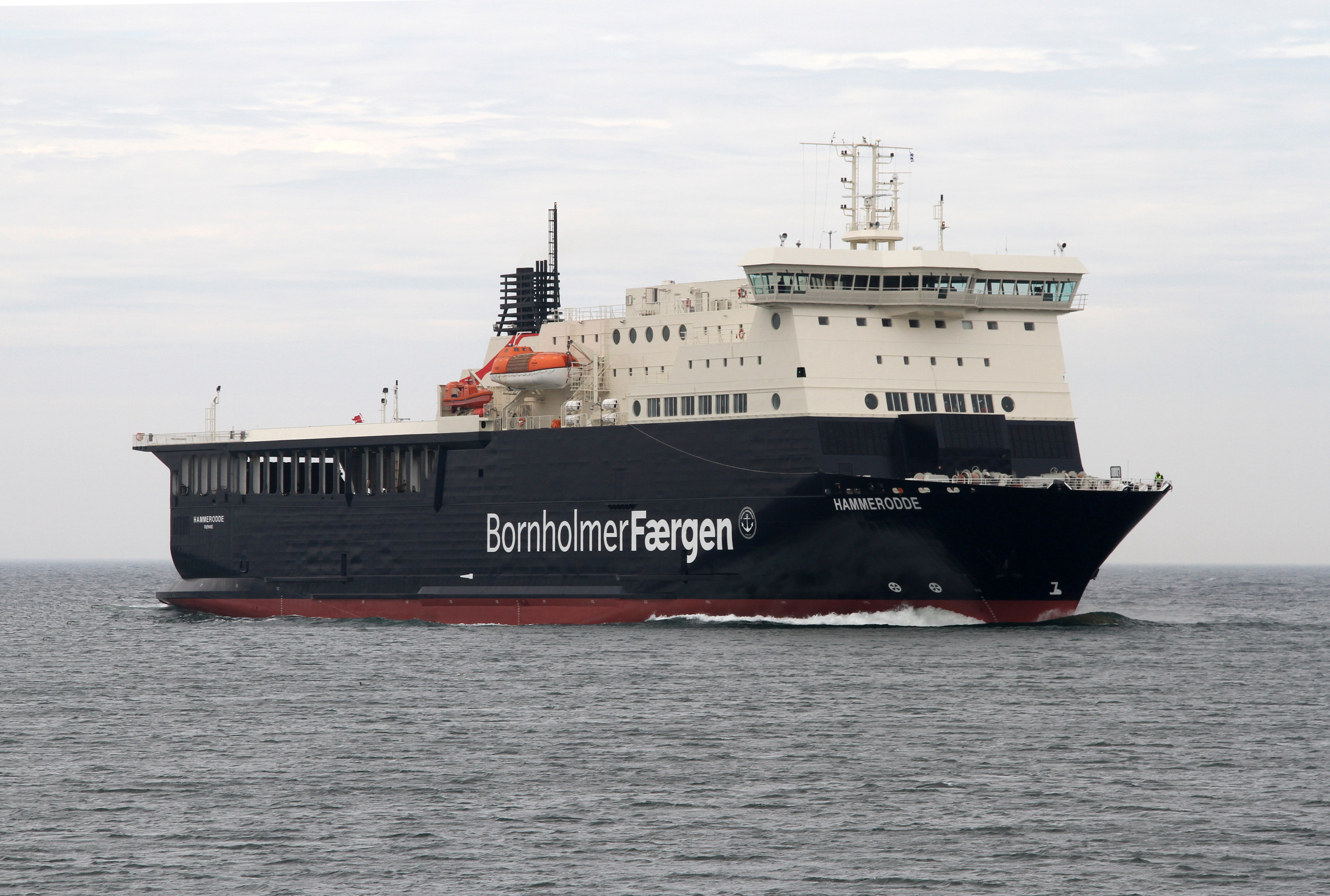
Hammerodde

BornholmerFærgen was a Danish ferry company which connected the island of Bornholm to Denmark, Sweden and Germany. Until 2011 the company was known as Bornholmstrafikken, when it became a subsidiary of Danske Færger. In 2018 Molslinjen took over the ferry service to Bornholm under the name Bornholmslinjen.

== History ==
1866
The Dampskibsselskabet på Bornholm af 1866 A/S was formed.

1963
Car ferry Bornholmerpilen enters service.

1973
Danish state takes control.

2000
High speed catamaran Villum Clausen enters service.

2004
Danish State puts Bornholm routes out to tender. Danish terminal moves from Copenhagen to Køge.

2005
Bornholmstrafikken A/S is formed. New ROPAX vessels Hammerodde, and Dueodde enter service.

2007
Bornholmstrafikken A/S enters into a 50/50 collaboration with the Clipper Group A/S and establish Nordic Ferry Services A/S

2010
The Hammerodde is rebuilt at STX Europe. The Dueodde is sold to New Zealand ferry operator Strait Shipping (Bluebridge). Bornholmstrafikken re-brands as BornholmerFærgen.

2011
High speed catamaran Leonora Christina enters service.

2016
In 2016 Molslinjen won a 10-year public tender to operate ferry services to Bornholm, and operations started in September 2018 under the name "Bornholmslinjen".

== Routes ==
BornholmerFærgen operate three routes from the island of Bornholm.

Route	Frequency	Crossing time
Rønne ↔ Ystad	up to 8 crossings per day	1hr 15mins (Fast ferry); 2hrs 30mins (Conventional ferry)
Rønne ↔ Køge	1 crossings per day	5hrs 30mins
Rønne ↔ Sassnitz	up to 8 crossings per week	3hrs 30mins

== Fleet ==
BornholmerFærgen currently operates a fleet of three ships (one fast ferry and two conventional ferries). A second fast ferry joined the fleet in September 2011.

=== Current vessels ===
MS Povl Anker
The Povl Anker was built at the Danish Aalborg Shipyard in 1978. She is the oldest vessel in the BornholmerFærgen fleet. The vessel is named after Paul Hansen Anker, who was vicar of Rutsker and Hasle and active in the rebellion against the Swedish government in 1658. BornholmerFærgen plan to keep her in service until 2017 as a reserve ferry. In October 2006, she served as backdrop Paprika Steen’s 2007 movie, With Your Permission. The Povl Anker was classified in 1978 as a I 3/3 E, Deep Sea Car Ferry, ICE II at Bureau Veritas, meaning that she is strengthened for navigation in ice.

=== Past vessels ===
MS Dueodde (2005-2010)
Sister ship to the Hammerodde. Built in 2005 by Merwede. In September 2010 she was purchased by New Zealand ferry operator Strait Shipping (Bluebridge) and renamed MV Straitsman for service on Cook Strait. She was purchased by Condor Ferries in early 2023 and is currently in service with Brittany Ferries as the MV Islander.

MS Jens Kofod (1979-2005)
Sister ship to Povl Anker. Sold to Eckerö Linjen in 2005 for service between Eckerö and Grisslehamn, The vessel was named after Jens Kofod Pedersen, who, like Paul Hansen Anker was active in the struggle against the Swedish government and was a cousin of Villum Clausen.

MS Peder Olsen (1991-1999)
Built in 1974 as the Kalle III for Jydsk Færgefart A/S. Sold to Moby Lines in 1999 for service in the Tyrrhenian Sea.

MS Rotna (1971-1978)
Built in 1962 as the Virgem de Fatima for Juelsminde-Kalundborg Linien. Sold to Gozo Channel Line in 1978 for service in the Mediterranean, renamed Rotna. Broken up in 2002.

HSC Villum Clausen (2000-2017)
(Launched: 2000) fast ferry (catamaran) Capacity approximately 215 cars and 1055 passengers requiring seats for all. Top speed 48 knots. Recorded in the Guinness Book of Records for its top speed and the longest distance in 24 hours of the voyage from the shipyard Austal Ships in Australia to Denmark. It was named after Villum Clausen, who was the brother of Jens Pedersen Kofod, and it was Villum Clausen, who shot the Swedish commander Johan Printzensköld who tried to escape arrest. Since 2017 it was known as World Champion Jet for Seajets.

MS Hammerodde (2005-2018)
Built at Merwede shipyard in the Netherlands in 2005. Capacity 1235 lane meters, 400 passengers, 108 berths in 60 cabins. Ice class 1C. The Hammerodde was rebuilt by the STX Europe shipyard in 2010 with an extra vehicle deck at the stern. Since 2018 it was renamed as Stena Vinga for Stena Line.
