= MV Biscaglia =

History

Liberia
- Name: Biscaglia
- Owner: Winged Foot Shipping LLC, of the Marshall Islands
- Operator: Ishima (International Ship Management) Pte. Ltd., of Singapore
- Route: From Dumai, Indonesia, to Barcelona, Spain, via the Suez Canal
- Builder: Odense Staalskibsværft A/S, of Odense, Denmark
- Launched: 8 August 1986
- Completed: 1986
- Homeport: Monrovia
- Identification: IMO number: 8406339, Signal Letters: A8FH3
- Captured: 28 November 2008
- Fate: Scrapped 2013, Alang.

General characteristics
- Type: Chemical tanker
- Tonnage: 27,350 DWT
- Crew: 30

MV Biscaglia was a chemical tanker managed by Ishima Pte. Ltd. of Singapore and held by Industrial Shipping Enterprises Management Company LLC of Stamford, Connecticut, United States.

== Attack ==
On 28 November 2008 the ship was carrying palm oil in the Gulf of Aden and was hijacked by Somali pirates. The attack took place within the Maritime Security Patrol Area and was attributed to six pirates armed with AK-47s and rocket-propelled grenades in a high-speed skiff. The ship was the 97th to be hijacked off the coast of Somalia in 2008. In addition to the three security guards who escaped by jumping into the sea, 25 Indian and two Bangladeshi were members of the crew.

The two British and one Irish guard, were employed by British-based security company Anti Piracy Maritime Security Solutions (APMSS), of Poole, Dorset. All three were military-trained, two being former marines and one a former paratrooper, and were "... on board the vessel to provide logistical support and non-lethal defensive counter-measures." according to Andrew Mwangura, coordinator of the East African Seafarers Assistance Program.

They did what they felt they had to do to save their lives and the lives of the crew. They were unarmed. They had no other option. As far as I'm concerned they deserve a medal. (Nick Davis, Head, APMSS, 29 November 2008)

Unarmed, the security guards attempted to repel the attackers for about 40 minutes by firing water cannon, zigzagging the skiff, and using a LRAD, a non-lethal weapon that fires focused sound beams producing excruciating pain. A distress signal was received at 0447 hours UTC by the International Maritime Bureau's Piracy Reporting Centre, in Kuala Lumpur. After the pirates boarded the ship and continued to shoot at the security force, the guards managed to escape by jumping overboard. They were rescued from the sea by a German navy helicopter, and taken first to the French light monitoring frigate Nivôse before being transferred to the Jean de Vienne, a F70 type anti-submarine frigate of the French Marine Nationale.

The incident caused the usefulness of LRADs to be called into question by Lloyd's List.

The vessel was finally released on 24 January 2009 thanks to the efforts of Capt Satya Sahoo and his team from Ishima and the owners ISEC. All crew of the vessel at the time of its release were reported as being in good health.

== See also ==
- Piracy in Somalia
