= MV S Venus =

History
- Name: S Venus
- Port of registry: Panama
- Launched: 24 December 1983
- Completed: 1984
- Identification: IMO number: 8323111; Callsign: HOVX
- Fate: Scrapped Alang 17 December 2011

General characteristics
- Type: Bulk carrier
- Length: 189.73 ft (57.83 m)

MV S Venus is a freighter of Panamanian registry, attacked by Somali pirates on January 1, 2009. It was successfully defended by defensive actions by members of Anti Piracy Maritime Security Solutions who used paint thinner, Molotov cocktails and a flare gun to set the attacking vessel ablaze. After receiving a distress call from the freighter, French naval frigate Premier-Maître L'Her headed for the rescue. However, before the frigate's arrival, the pirates ceased their attack. After that, S Venus reiterated its distress call because of another attack about 40 kilometres (25 mi) from the position, and the frigate once again responded and found two small boats nearby, designated by the crew of the ship as the skiffs for assault pirates. The special force of the French navy ordered two skiffs carrying eight Somalis to stop. A visit on board the boat found six AK-47 assault rifles, one rocket-propelled grenade rocket launcher, ammunition, a grappling hook and two boarding ladders, and a GPS (Global Position System) among others, which were confiscated by the navy. The eight Somalis suspected of piracy were taken into custody by the French frigate to be handed over to the authorities in that country.
