= MV Stolt Strength =

History

Philippines
- Name: Stolt Strength
- Owner: Sagana Shipping, Manila
- Launched: 9 August 2005
- Identification: IMO number: 9311024
- Captured: November 10, 2008, released April 21, 2009

General characteristics
- Type: Chemical tanker
- Tonnage: 20,059 GT; 33,209 DWT
- Crew: 23

MV Stolt Strength is a Philippines-flagged ship, managed by a Panamanian company. It was hijacked by Somali pirates off the Gulf of Aden on November 10, 2008. The chemical tanker, carrying phosphoric acid and 21 Filipino crewmembers aboard, was attacked by men carrying automatic rifles and rocket-propelled grenades. The ship's owner, Sagana Shipping, of Manila, was awaiting word from the pirates regarding ransom.

The hijacking of the Stolt Strength preceded the hijacking of at least two other ships in the same month, including the Sirius Star and the Delight.

The ship was released 21 April 2009, but it is unclear if any ransom was paid. After its release, the ship ran out of fuel off the coast of Somalia, but was later given 5 days of fuel by a ship of the U.S. Navy.

== See also ==
- Piracy in Somalia
