= Danske Færger =

Danish ferry company

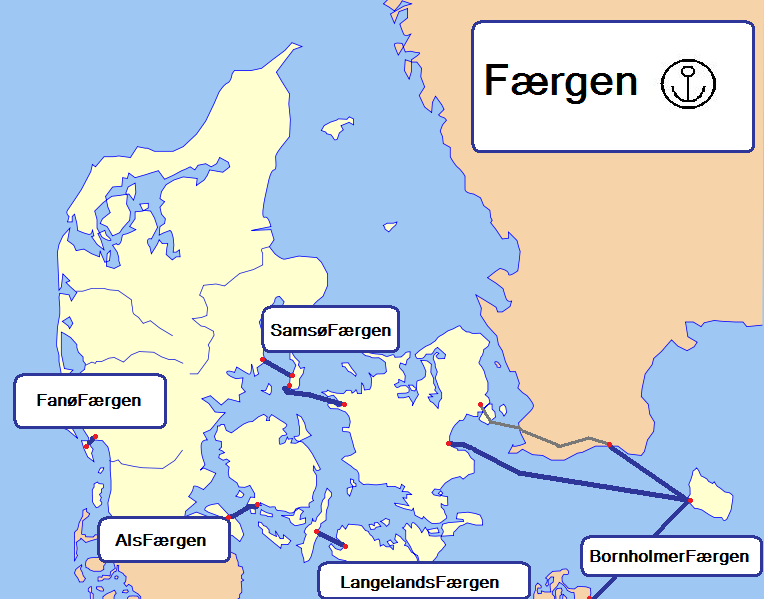
- Formerly: Nordic Ferry Services
- Founded: 2008
- Defunct: 17 December 2018
- Headquarters: Rønne, Denmark
- Area served: Denmark
- Key people: John Steen-Mikkelsen, CEO; Per Gullestrup, Chairman
- Services: Passenger transportation Freight transportation
- Website: færgen.dk

Danske Færger (English. Danish Ferries), styled as Færgen (English: The Ferry) was a Danish ferry company. It was created on 1 October 2011 through the merger of Bornholmstrafikken and Scandlines' internal Danish activities. The company was a 50/50 partnership between the Danish state and Clipper Group. The company was first formed in April 2008 as Nordic Ferry Services. In 2018 Danske Færger was sold to Molslinjen.

== Routes ==
As of 2001, the company operated eight routes:

- AlsFærgen
  - (Bøjden – Fynshav)
- BornholmerFærgen
  - (Ystad – Rønne)
  - (Køge – Rønne)
  - (Sassnitz D – Rønne)
- FanøFærgen
  - (Esbjerg – Nordby)
- LangelandsFærgen
  - (Spodsbjerg – Tårs)
- SamsøFærgen
  - (Kalundborg – Kolby Kås)
  - (Sælvig – Hou)

== Gallery ==
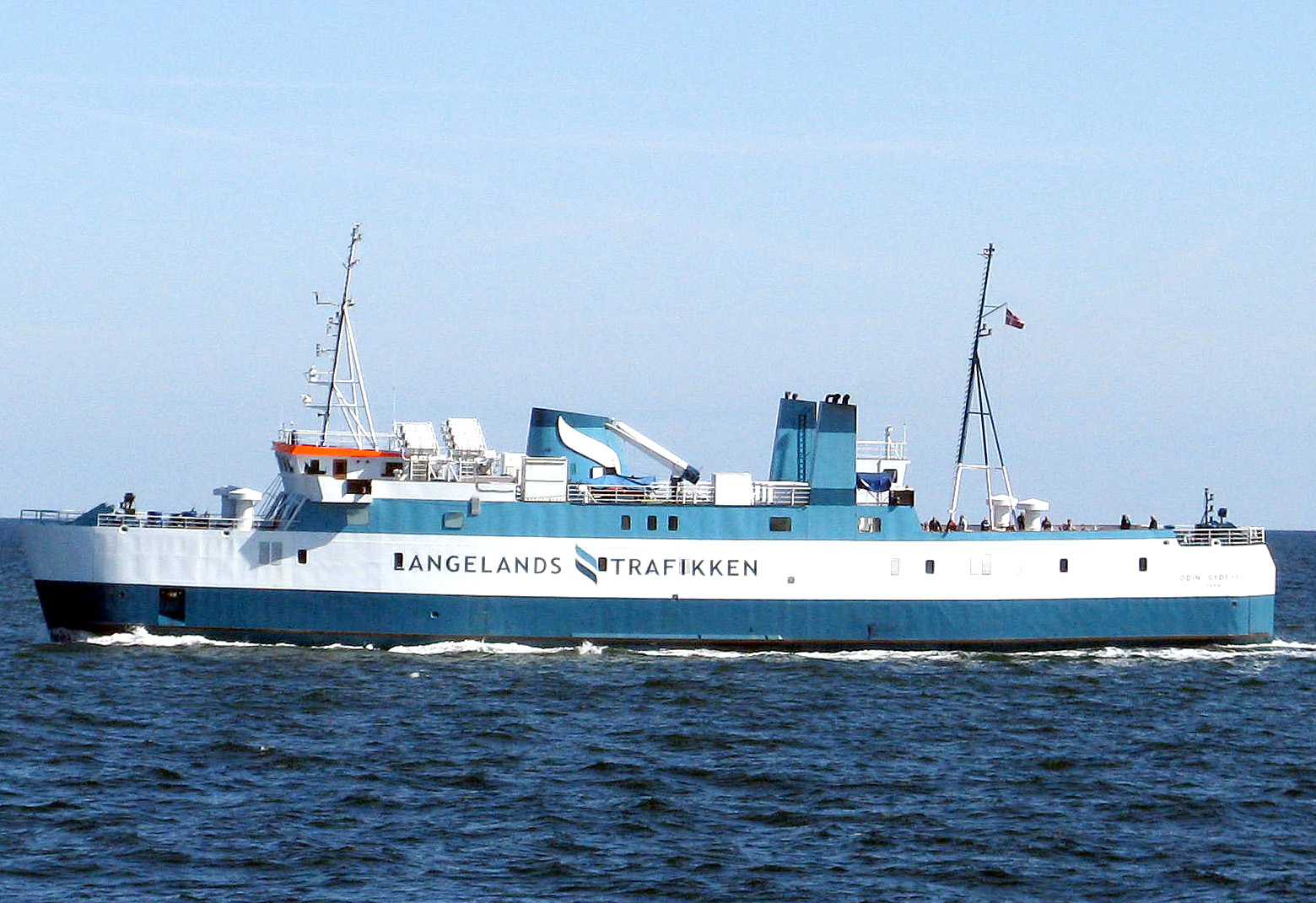
Odin Sydfyn

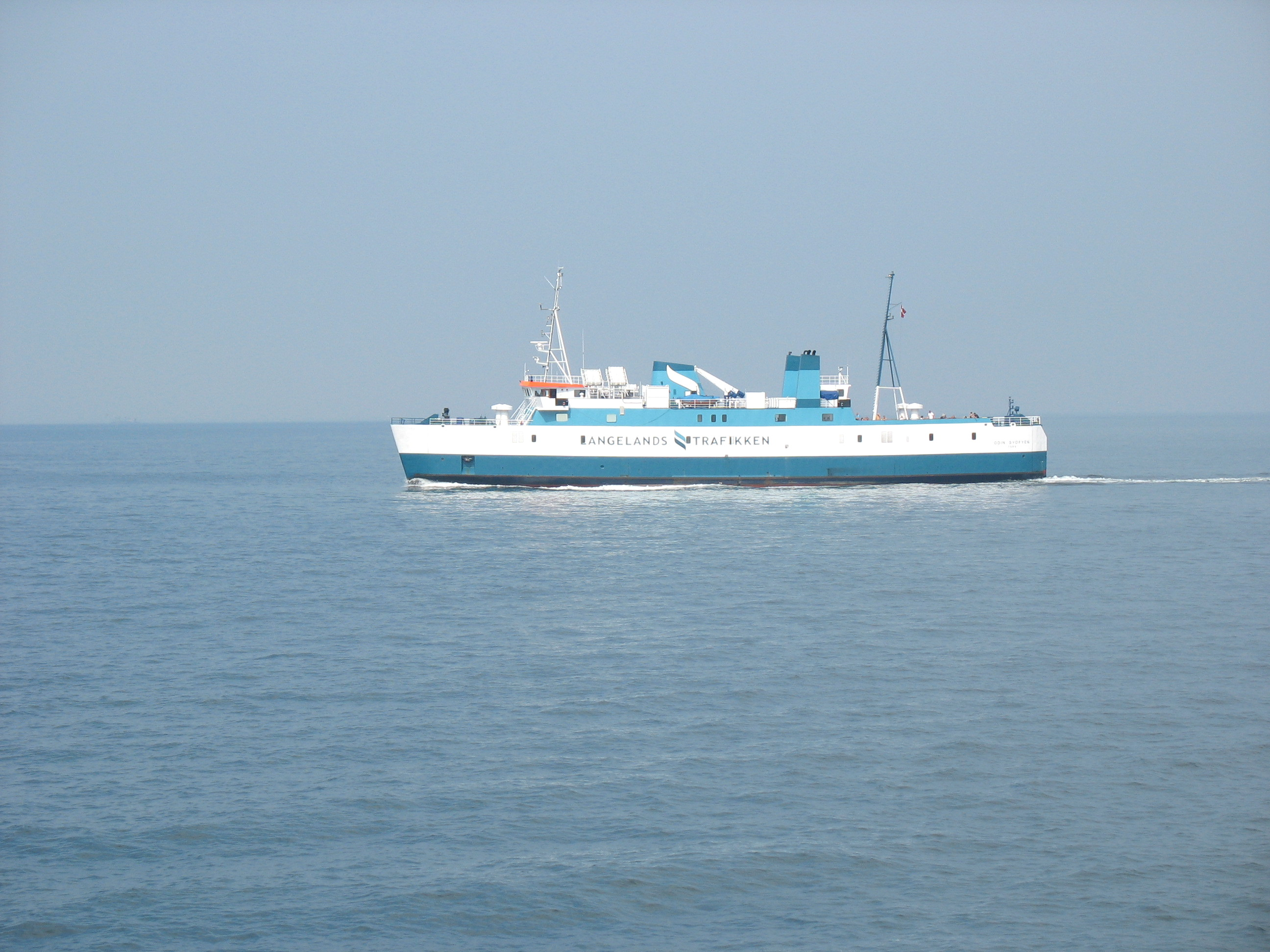
Spodsbjerg-Tårs

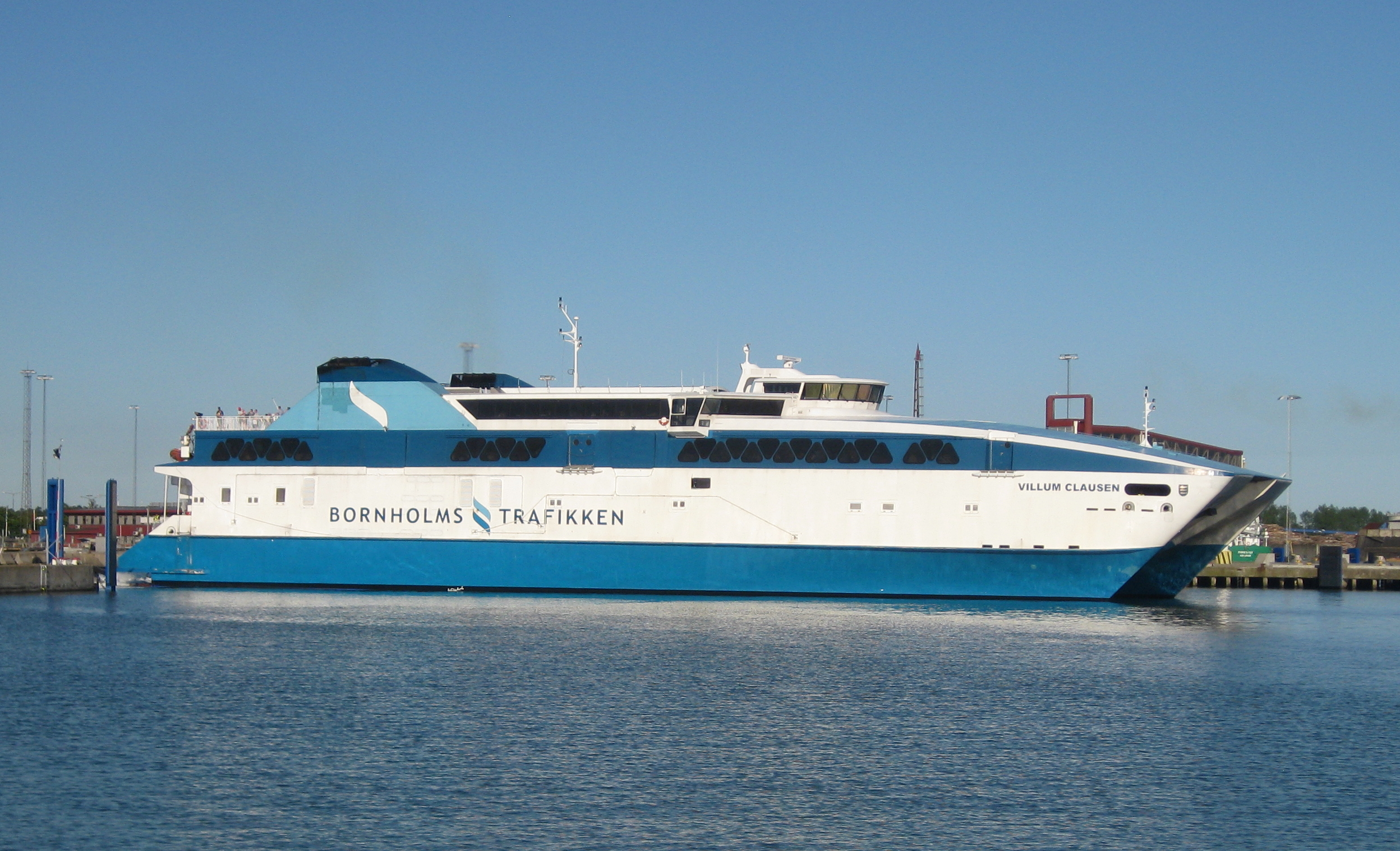
Villum Clausen

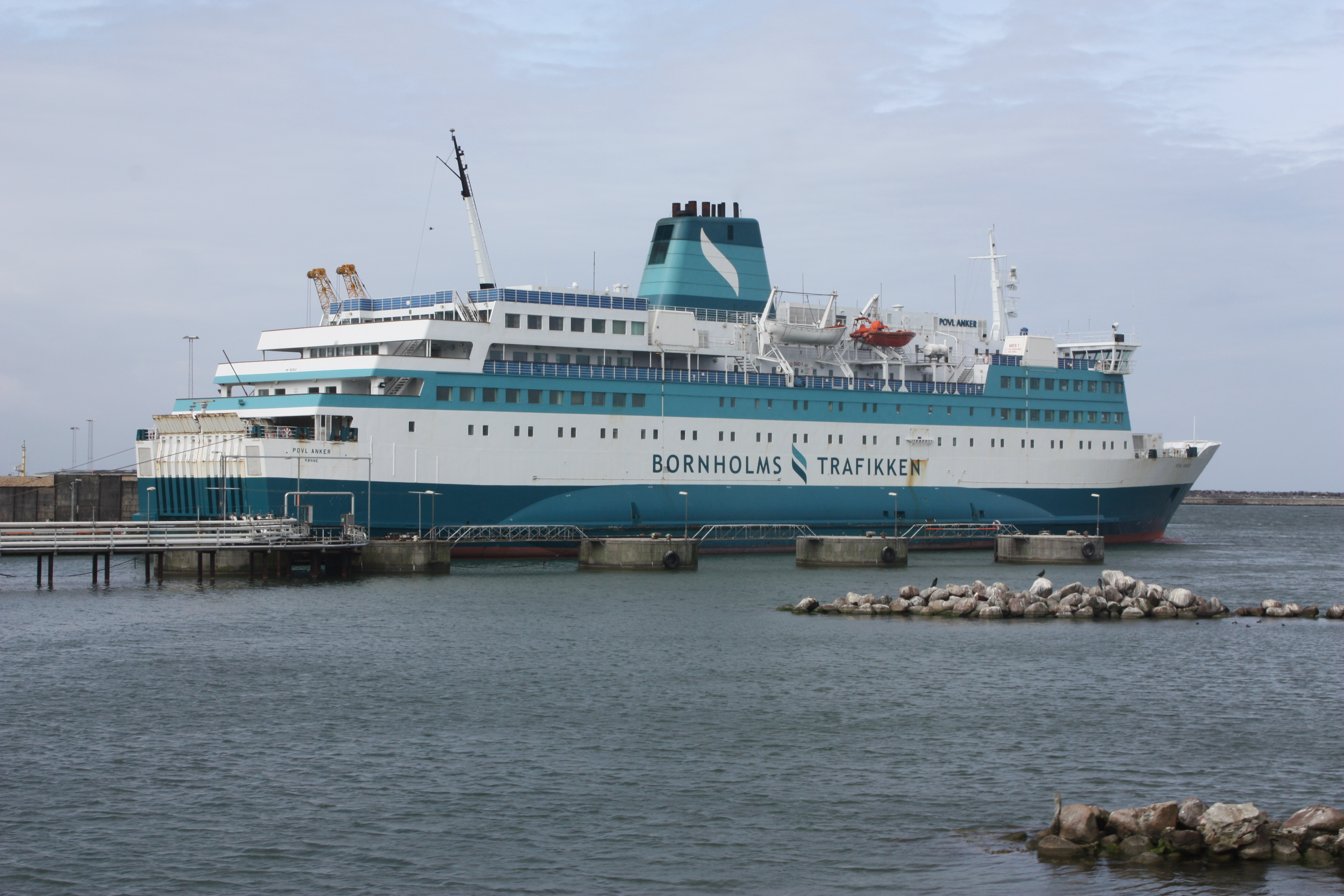
Povl Anker
