= Per Gullestrup =

- Born: 6 October 1955 (age 70)

Per Gullestrup (born 6 October 1955) is a Danish ship owner, investor and philanthropist, best known for successfully negotiating the release of the Clipper Group ship CEC Future and its crew, held hostage by Somali pirates in November 2008. The incident was the basis for the subsequent film, A Hijacking, released in 2013.

== Biography ==
Gullestrup was born on 6 October 1955 to Lars and Gitta Gullestrup in Copenhagen, Denmark, and is the eldest of three children. His mother, Gitta, physically disabled from birth, encouraged him to pursue a career in shipping when he left school at the age of 15.

Joining A. P. Møller - Mærsk as an apprentice in Copenhagen, Denmark, Gullestrup was later transferred to London, United Kingdom in the late 1970s. He joined Armada Group in their Houston, Texas office in 1983, which later became Clipper Group. In the late 1990s, Gullestrup moved back to Copenhagen, Denmark, and Clipper merged with another shipping company, Elite. The newly merged company became known as Clipper-Elite, and later Clipper Group, and Gullestrup became the CEO. Gullestrup is accredited with helping drive Clipper Group to become the world's largest shipping company within a number of bulk segments and project vessels.

Gullestrup currently sits on the board of numerous companies and as of 2013 stepped in as chairman of the International Seafarers' Welfare and Assistance Network, an organisation that promotes the welfare of seafarers globally. In 2014, he was appointed as a non-executive director with Garrets.

== 2008 hijacking ==
It was during his tenure as CEO that in November 2008, that one of Clipper's ships, the CEC Future, was seized by Somali pirates. Gullestrup took the lead in negotiations with the hijackers, resulting in the successful release of both the ship and its crew. A documentary was produced on the story, and subsequently the Danish film, A Hijacking, based on the incident and loosely around Gullestrup's role in it.

As a direct result of the incident involving the Somali pirates, Gullestrup and other industry leaders started the Danish-Somali charity initiative called Fair Fishing in Somaliland. Fair Fishing teaches locals how to fish and live off the natural resources in order to make an honest living. Gullestrup sits on the board of Clipper Group but has stepped down from the daily running of Clipper Group.

== Personal ==
Gullestrup married Helle Henriksen, a former model and nurse, in 1979. They have two children.
