= MV Islander =

Roll-on/roll-off ferry built in 2005

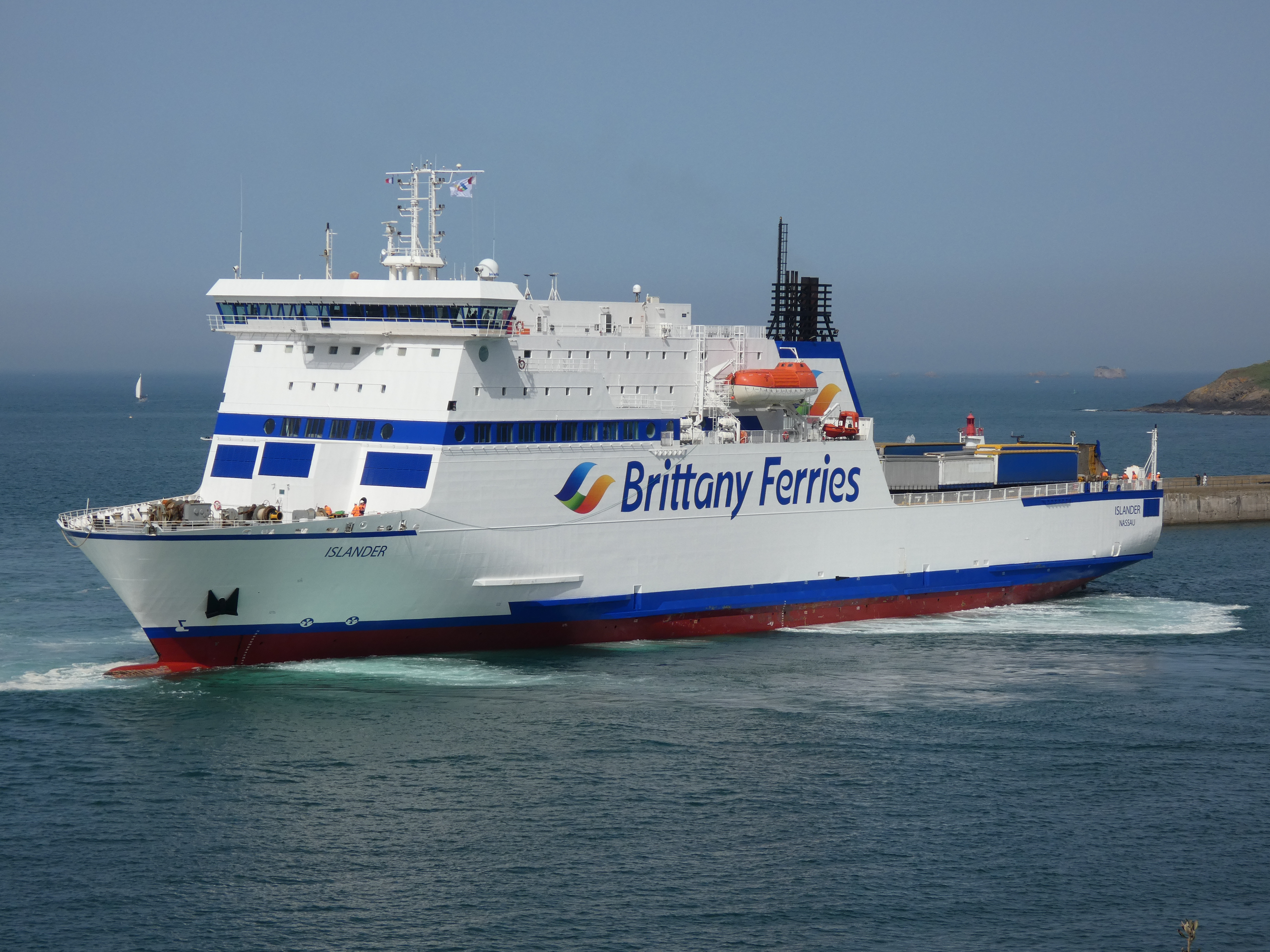
- Islander in Saint-Malo in March 2025

History
- Name: 2005-2010: Dueodde; 2010-2023: Straitsman; 2023-2025: Condor Islander; 2025-present: Islander
- Owner: 2005-2010: Bornholmstrafikken; 2010-2023: StraitNZ; 2023-2025: Condor Ferries and the States of Guernsey; 2025-present: the States of Guernsey
- Operator: 2005-2010: Bornholmstrafikken; 2010-2023: StraitNZ; 2023-2025: Condor Ferries; 2025-present: Brittany Ferries
- Port of registry: Nassau, Bahamas
- Route: Portsmouth⇄Guernsey; Portsmouth–Guernsey–Saint-Malo
- Builder: Volharding Shipyards, Netherlands
- Yard number: 703
- In service: 2005
- Identification: IMO number: 9323704; MMSI number: 311001287; Callsign: ZMSM
- Status: Active

General characteristics
- Type: ROPAX ferry
- Tonnage: 13,906 GT
- Length: 124.9 m (409 ft 9 in)
- Beam: 23.4 m (76 ft 9 in)
- Draft: 5.6 m (18 ft 4 in)
- Decks: 10
- Installed power: 2 × MaK 9M32 diesel engines; 4,320 kW each at 600 rpm
- Speed: 18.8 knots (34.8 km/h; 21.6 mph)
- Capacity: 400 passengers; 1,248 m (4,094 ft) lane for vehicles

Islander is a ROPAX ferry owned by the States of Guernsey and operated by Brittany Ferries on services connecting Guernsey in the Channel Islands to Portsmouth, England and Saint-Malo, France. Built in 2005 as Dueodde for Bornholmstrafikken, she has since seen service with StraitNZ as Straitsman across the Cook Strait between 2010 and 2023, before being sold to Condor Ferries as Condor Islander. The vessel was renamed Islander in 2025, following the company's majority takeover by Brittany Ferries.

== History ==
=== Bornholmstrafikken ===
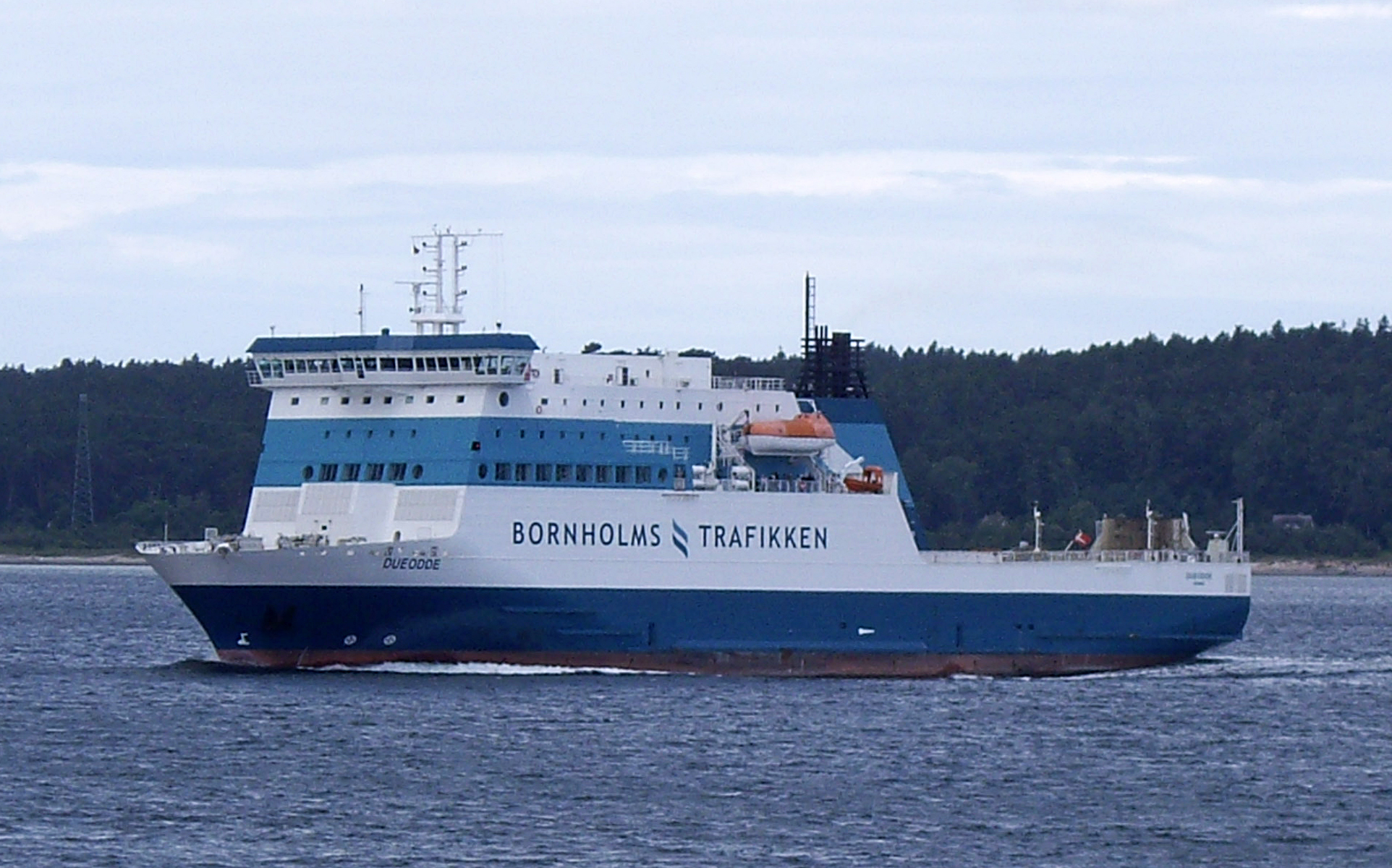
Dueodde in 2009

Islander entered service with Bornholmstrafikken in 2005 as Dueodde. Alongside Hammerodde, she operated routes linking Bornholm with Denmark.

=== StraitNZ ===
In 2010, the vessel was sold to StraitNZ and was renamed Straitsman in recognition of StraitNZ's first vessel, which was in service for 11 years from when the company first launched in 1992.

=== Condor Ferries ===
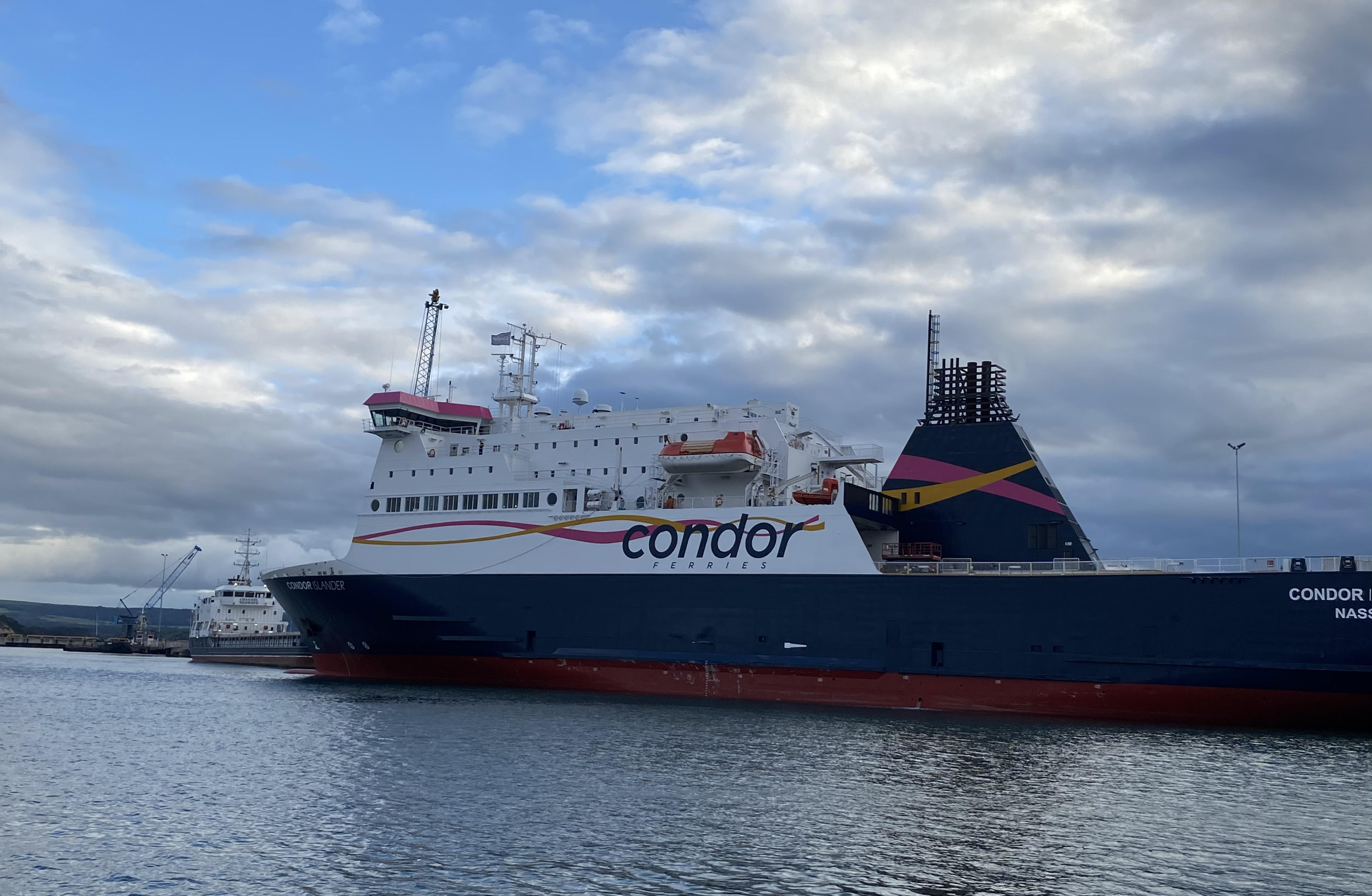
Condor Islander in Poole Harbour in 2023

In March 2023, it was sold to Condor Ferries to operate services between Portsmouth and the Channel Islands. It was renamed Condor Islander.

The ferry was purchased in a joint venture between Condor and the States of Guernsey.

In July 2023, the vessel arrived in the Channel Islands after several weeks in a dry dock in El Astillero, Spain. Following refurbishment, she entered service in November 2023.

=== Brittany Ferries ===
Following Condor's majority takeover by Brittany Ferries in 2024 and a new 15-year contract agreement with Guernsey, the Condor prefix was dropped from Islander's name, and she was repainted in the Brittany Ferries livery in Gdańsk, Poland. She remains under the ownership of the States of Guernsey and is now leased to Brittany Ferries

== Incidents ==
=== StraitNZ ===
- In July 2016, a truck and B-train trailer unit aboard the Straitsman snapped its lashings and fell overboard off the coast of Island Bay.
- On 24 February 2023, a crewmember was hit by a truck reversing on board at Wellington, causing delays. The crewmember suffered bruising and a broken wrist.

=== Condor Ferries ===
- Upon introduction to the Condor fleet, the first sailing for Condor Islander was scheduled to take place in November 2023 however, it was brought forward to October 2023 with freight services starting on the 8th and both passenger and freight services on the 15th. It was then pushed back again to 20 October 2023 because of the late installation of vital equipment.
- Due to the conditions of Storm Babet, Condor Islander's first sailing with passengers on 20 October 2023 was cancelled and pushed back to the 22rd of the same month.
- On 23 October 2023, the inter-island service from Guernsey to Jersey was cancelled due to technical problems. The sailing onto Portsmouth departed from Guernsey instead, much earlier than anticipated
- On 25 October 2023, it was discovered that there were faults with the front bow thrusters of the ship and that they would need repairing. It was announced that the vessel would be pulled out of service until 2 November of the same year and all scheduled sailings were cancelled.
- On 3 July 2024, Condor Islander came into contact with one of the Saint Helier Harbour walls during strong winds, upon arrival in Jersey. The vessel remained in the harbour overnight before continuing its sailing onto Guernsey. There was recorded damage to both the Condor Islander and the east berth of the harbour.
