= Clipper Group =

International shipping company

- Industry: Shipping
- Founded: 1991
- Founder: Torben Gülnar Jensen
- Headquarters: Copenhagen, Denmark & Nassau, Bahamas
- Key people: Frank G Jensen, Chairman & Partner, Peter Norborg, Group CEO, and Flemming Steen, Group CFO
- Services: Bulk
- Subsidiaries: Danske Færger
- Website: www.clipper-group.com

Clipper Group is an international shipping company, founded in 1991 by Torben Gülnar Jensen, after a split of Armada Shipping A/S, which was founded in 1972 together with Jørgen Dannesboe.

Primary focus is on bulk, especially within the handysize and supramax segments, but the company also has investments within e.g. ro-ro (Seatruck Ferries) and ferries in Denmark. In total, Clipper operates a fleet of around 160 dry bulk vessels.

Clipper Group is commercially headquartered in Copenhagen and legally in Nassau, Bahamas, and has approximately 200 employees on shore and more than 1,400 seafarers.

== 2008 CEC Future hijacking ==
On 7 November 2008, a group of armed pirates hijacked a Clipper-owned vessel, the CEC Future, off the northern coast of Somalia. The ship's crew of thirteen was held hostage for 71 days and finally released on 16 January 2009, following negotiations by CEO Per Gullestrup who orchestrated a ransom payment of $1.7 million.

This incident subsequently became the inspiration for the Danish movie, A Hijacking which was released in 2012.

== Subsidiaries ==
=== Current ===
- Danske Færger (50% joint venture)
- Greystone Capital

=== Former ===
- Seatruck Ferries, purchased 2002, sold 2022

== Career ==
Clipper Group offers a two-year Shipping Trainee Program in Copenhagen, in cooperation with the Danish Shipowners' Association (Danish Shipping Academy).
