= MV Yasa Neslihan =

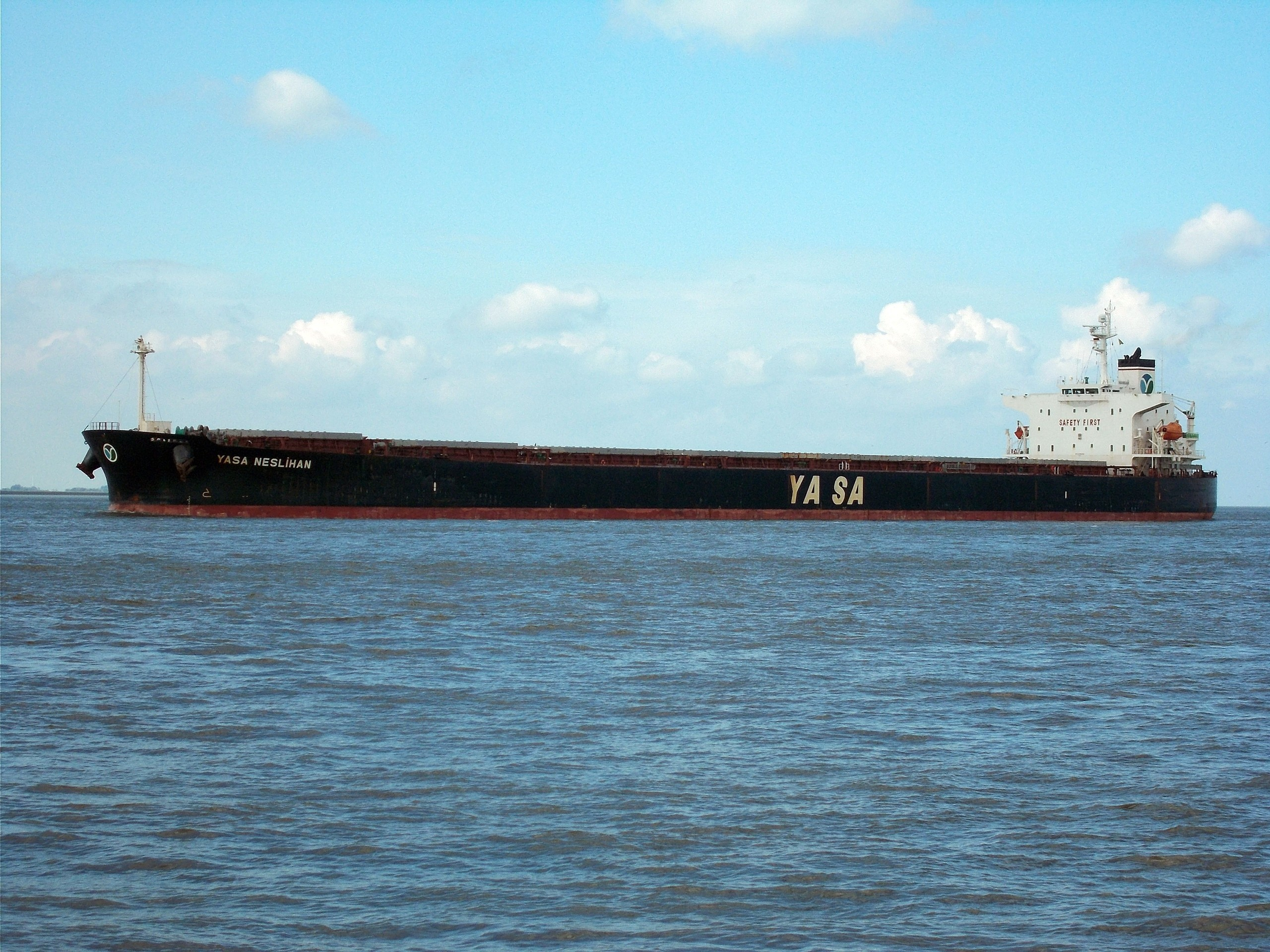
- Yasa Neslihan

History
- Name: Yasa Neslihan
- Owner: YA-SA Denizcilik A.Ş., Istanbul, Turkey
- Operator: YA-SA Denizcilik A.Ş., Istanbul, Turkey
- Port of registry: Marshall Islands
- Ordered: January 1, 2003
- Builder: Tsuneishi Shipbuilding, Fukuyama, Hiroshima
- Launched: 28 July 2005
- Completed: 2005
- Identification: IMO number: 9286566
- Status: In active service

General characteristics
- Class & type: Kamsarmax BC; Bulk cargo
- Tonnage: 42,895 GT; 82,849 DWT
- Length: 222.0 m (728 ft 4 in) LBP
- Beam: 32.26 m (105 ft 10 in) (moulded)
- Draught: 12.20 m (40 ft 0 in)
- Depth: 19.90 m (65 ft 3 in)
- Speed: 14.5 knots (26.9 km/h; 16.7 mph) (max)
- Crew: 20

MV Yasa Neslihan is a bulk cargo ship owned and operated by the Istanbul based Turkish company YA-SA Denizcilik A.Ş. (YA-SA Maritime Co.), a subsidiary of YA-SA Holding A.Ş., sailing under a Marshall Islands flag of convenience. She joined company's fleet on November 14, 2005.

On October 29, 2008, the ship was captured by Somali pirates in the twenty-ninth such attack in 2008. The Yasa Neslihan's crew (at the time of capture) consisted of 20 Turks.

== Hijacking ==
On 29 October 2008, the Yasa Neslihan was hijacked near the Gulf of Aden. The ship was allegedly heading to China, from Canada transporting 77,000 tons of iron ore. The owner company learned about the seizure of the ship through vessel's alarm system. NATO warships followed the hijacked ship from a distance, made however no attempt to intervene. The pirates did not contact the owner to make any request before the ship anchored. The ship-owner received information from NATO only about the ship's coordinates.

Fehmi Ulgener, the lawyer and the spokesman of the ship-owner, said at a press conference on November 1 that "the captain of the ship called us and said their ship anchored. He said the pirates treated them well and the crew was in good health condition". On November 4, the spokesman said the pirates demanded a ransom to return the ship and the crew, without disclosing the amount of the ransom.

On 6 January 2009 the ship was released, Andrew Mwangura, East Africa's Coordinator of Seafarers Assistance Program said "Gunmen have released one of the three Turkish ships. The vessel was released on Tuesday and I'm not sure whether ransom was paid".
