= Maritime Security Patrol Area =

"I have just come home from Port Said, after successfully commanding a slow speed laden bulk carrier through the Gulf of Aden. We followed the courses through the MSPA (Maritime Security Patrol Area) corridor, which is patrolled by naval fleet. It was a very tense 40-hour passage. We witnessed an attempted attack just 10 miles behind us, one successful hijacking and another two attempts just close."

— Captain Vinayak Anant Marathe, India (2008)

The Maritime Security Patrol Area (MSPA) is a specified patrol zone in the Gulf of Aden and Guardafui Channel. Its borders are unmarked, but are a narrow, rectangular corridor between Somalia and Yemen, within the northern sector of the gulf. The MSPA was established 22 August 2008 by the Combined Task Force 150, (CTF-150) a multinational, coalition naval task force in order to deter de-stabilizing activities, including piracy within this maritime geographical area. The establishment of the MSPA was directed by the Commander, United States Naval Central Command.

== See also ==
- Piracy in Somalia
