= MV Delight =

Hong Kong-flagged grain carrier

History

Hong Kong
- Name: Delight
- Owner: Starry Shine International Ltd.
- Operator: Islamic Republic of Iran Shipping Lines
- Port of registry: Hong Kong
- Builder: Daewoo Shipbuilding & Marine Engineering Co., Ltd.
- Laid down: January 1, 1985
- Launched: 1 April 1985
- Completed: 28 December 1985
- Identification: IMO number: 8320133; MMSI number: 477093300; Callsign: VREA9
- Captured: 18 November 2008; released 10 January 2009
- Fate: Scrapped

General characteristics
- Type: Bulk carrier
- Tonnage: 25,768 GT; 43,218 DWT
- Length: 190 m (623 ft 4 in)
- Beam: 30.03 m (98 ft 6 in)
- Draft: 11.62 m (38 ft 1 in)
- Propulsion: MAN B&W 6L60MC
- Crew: 25

MV Delight is a Hong Kong-flagged grain carrier. It was attacked and hijacked in the Gulf of Aden in the Arabian Sea off the coast of Yemen in the Horn of Africa by Somali pirates on 18 November 2008 at 2 p.m. The Delight, chartered by the Islamic Republic of Iran Shipping Lines, was carrying a cargo of 36,000 tonnes of wheat, and was heading for Iran's Bandar Abbas port. The 25 crew members were from India (7), Pakistan (2), Philippines (7), Iran (7), Ghana (2). The ship was released on 10 January 2009.

== Ransom ==
On 22 November, India's Directorate General of Shipping announced that communication had been established between the pirates and Islamic Republic of Iran Shipping Lines' Emergency Response Committee.

== See also ==
- Piracy in Somalia
