= MV Straitsman (1972) =

History
- Name: Straitsman (1972-2004); Sinu-I-Wasa (2004-2016)
- Operator: Venu Shipping; StraitNZ; Tasmanian Transport Commission; RH Houfe & Co
- Port of registry: Suva, Fiji
- Builder: NQEA, Cairns
- Launched: 29 January 1972
- Completed: 1974
- Out of service: 2016
- Identification: IMO number: 7206031
- Fate: Ran aground

General characteristics
- Type: ROPAX ferry
- Tonnage: 1,481 GT
- Length: 63 m (206 ft 8 in)
- Beam: 12 m (39 ft 4 in)

MV Straitsman was a Bass Strait 720-ton roll-on/roll-off ferry livestock carrier. Built by NQEA, Cairns for RH Houfe & Co, it was launched on 29 January 1972. It was built to operate between Melbourne, King Island and Stanley.

After RH Houfe & Co ran into financial difficulties, in 1973 the ship was purchased by the Tasmanian Transport Commission. On 23 March 1974, it capsized and sank in the Yarra River, Melbourne while approaching its berth with its vehicle door partly open, with the loss of two crew members and many of her cargo of 2,000 sheep. The ferry was heading upstream at 6 knots (6.9 mph; 11 km/h) when a crew member opened the stern door without the knowledge of the captain on the bridge.

Following salvage and repair, the vessel spent 15 years serving King Island, before being bought by Bluebridge, where it provided inter-island ferry services between the North and South Islands of New Zealand between 1992 and 2004. It was then sold to a Fijian shipping company, renamed Sinu-I-Wasa, running aground during Cyclone Winston in 2016.
