= Chemical tanker =

Type of tanker ship designed to transport chemicals in bulk

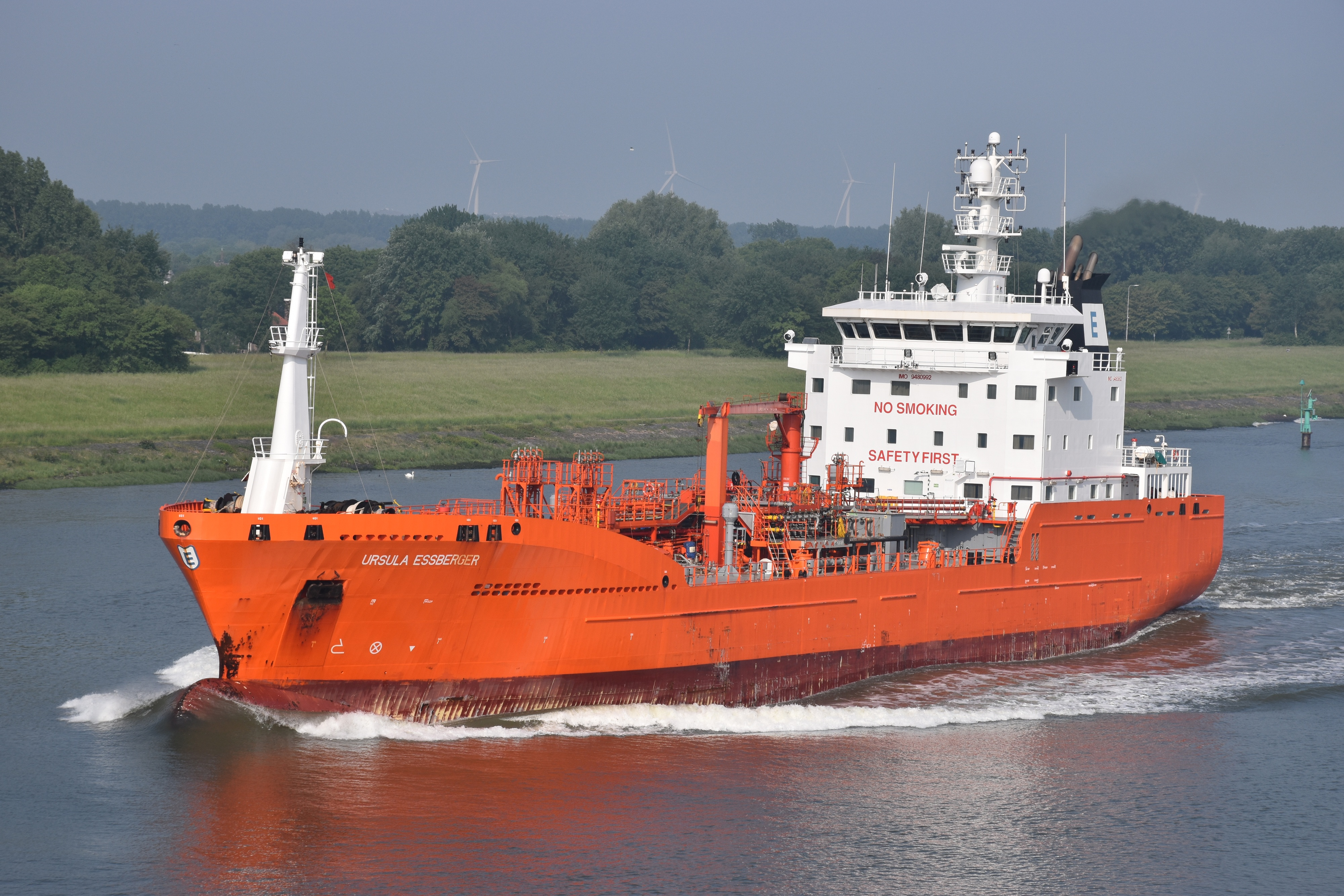
Chemical tanker Ursula Essberger

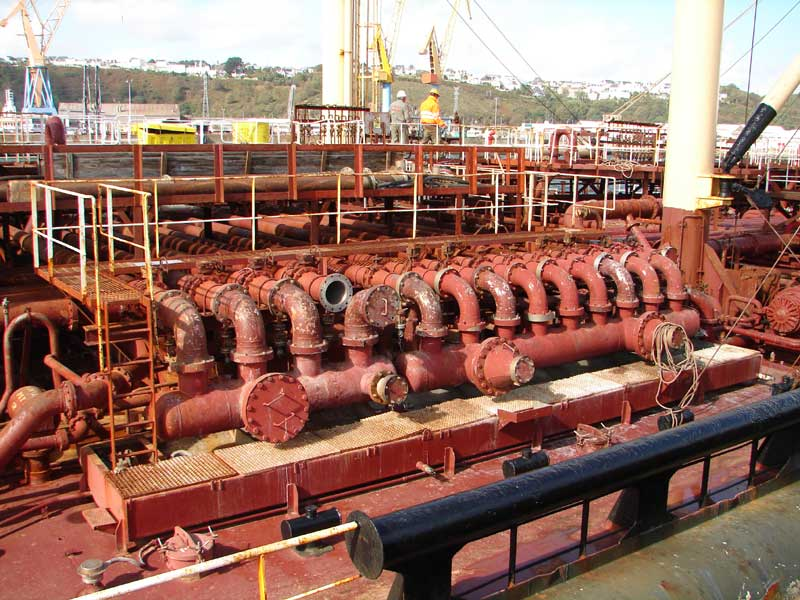
The deck of a chemical tanker has a complicated piping system. This is the Saudi chemical tanker of 43,851 tonnes deadweight (DWT) 1986 built Al Farabi, carrying molasses, in Brest.

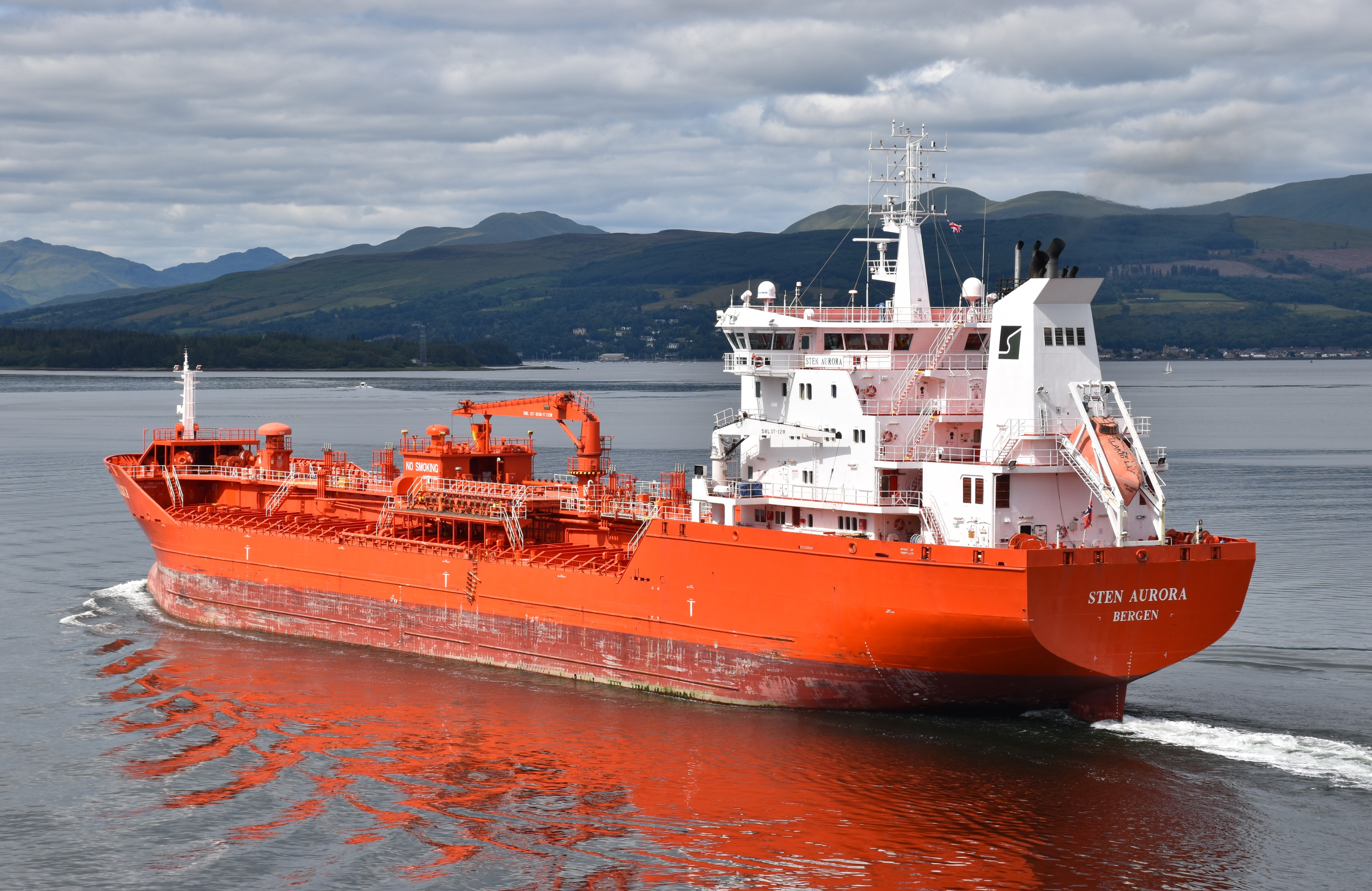
Chemical tanker Sten Aurora

A chemical tanker is a type of tanker ship designed to transport chemicals in bulk. As defined in MARPOL Annex II, chemical tanker means a ship constructed or adapted for carrying in bulk any liquid product listed in chapter 17 of the International Bulk Chemical Code. As well as industrial chemicals and clean petroleum products, such ships also often carry other types of sensitive cargo which require a high standard of tank cleaning, such as palm oil, vegetable oils, tallow, caustic soda, and methanol.

Oceangoing chemical tankers range from 5,000 tonnes deadweight (DWT) to 35,000 DWT in size, which is smaller than the average size of other tanker types due to the specialized nature of their cargo and the size restrictions of the port terminals where they call to load and discharge.

Chemical tankers normally have a series of separate cargo tanks which are either coated with specialized coatings such as phenolic epoxy or zinc paint, or made from stainless steel. The coating or cargo tank material determines what types of cargo a particular tank can carry: stainless steel tanks are required for aggressive acid cargoes such as sulfuric and phosphoric acid, while 'easier' cargoes — such as vegetable oil — can be carried in epoxy coated tanks. The coating or tank material also influences how quickly tanks can be cleaned. Typically, ships with stainless steel tanks can carry a wider range of cargoes and can clean more quickly between one cargo and another, which justifies the additional cost of their construction.

== Classification ==
In general, ships carrying chemicals in bulk are classed into three types:

=== Type 1 ===
Tankers intended to transport products with very serious environmental and safety hazards requiring maximum preventive measures to prevent any leakage of cargo.

=== Type 2 ===
Tankers intended to transport products with appreciably severe environmental and safety hazards requiring significant preventive measures to preclude an escape of such cargo.

=== Type 3 ===
Tankers intended to transport products with sufficiently severe environmental and safety hazards to require a moderate degree of containment to increase survival capability in a damaged condition. Most chemical tankers are IMO 2 and 3 rated, since the volume of IMO 1 cargoes is very limited.

== Main characteristics of chemical tankers ==
Chemical tankers often have a system for tank heating in order to maintain the viscosity of certain cargoes, typically by passing pressurized steam through stainless steel 'heating coils' in the cargo tanks. These coils circulate fluid in the tank by convection, transferring heat to the cargo. All modern chemical tankers feature a double-hull construction. And most have one hydraulically driven and submerged cargo pump for each tank with independent piping, which means that each tank can load separate cargo without them being mixed. Consequently, many ocean going chemical tankers may carry numerous different grades of cargo on a single voyage, often loading and discharging these "parcels" at different ports or terminals. This means that the scheduling, stowage planning and operation of such ships requires a high level of coordination and specialist knowledge, both at sea and on shore.

Tank cleaning after discharging cargo is a very important aspect of chemical tanker operations, because cargo residue can adversely affect the purity of the next cargo being loaded. Before tanks are cleaned, they must be properly ventilated and checked to be free of potentially toxic or explosive gases. Chemical tankers usually have transverse stiffeners on deck rather than inside the cargo tanks, in order to make the tank walls smooth and thus easier to clean using permanently fitted tank cleaning machines. Cargo tanks, either empty or filled, are normally protected against explosion by inert gas blankets. Nitrogen is often used as inert gas, supplied either from portable gas bottles or a Nitrogen generator.

Currently, the latest chemical tankers are built by shipbuilders in Japan, Korea or China, where the large majority of stainless steel chemical tankers are built, as welding stainless steel to the accuracy required for cargo tank construction is a difficult skill to acquire. Nations with minor builders include Turkey, Italy, Germany and Poland.

Notable major chemical tanker operators include Stolt-Nielsen, Odfjell, Navig8 and Mitsui O.S.K. Lines(MOL) chemical tankers, ASM. Charterers or the end users of the ships include oil majors, industrial consumers, commodity traders and specialist chemical companies.

== See also ==
- Ship transport
- List of tankers
