= Biscayneer (ship) =

Two vessels have been named Biscayneer, which generally means a sailor or a ship from Biscay:

- Biscayneer (1779 ship) was a cutter launched in 1779. From at least 1781 on she was a privateer based in Dartmouth, Devon. She captured or recaptured several vessels before her owner-captain sold her in 1783. New owners renamed her Retreat. She was last listed in 1784.
- Biscayneer (1783 ship) was a brig launched in 1776 in Spain, almost certainly under another name. She first appeared as Biscayneer in Lloyd's Register (LR) in 1783, with Edward Tool, master, and Holdsworth, owner. She had undergone some repairs in 1783. She traded between Dartmouth, Devon and Newfoundland. She suffered two major maritime incidents, one in 1786 and a second in 1789. Lloyd's Register for 1786 carried the annotation "Lost" by Biscayneer's name. Biscayner, Culley, master, was reported to have been lost at Newfoundland. She had come from Dartmouth and was said to have engaged in fishing. The report was in error. Early in 1789 Biscayneer came ashore and was severely damaged in the Isles of Scilly. She was on a voyage from Newfoundland to Barnstaple and Dartmouth. The next report, a week later, was that Biscayneer, Hodge, master, was at Scilly, with extensive damage, having come from San Sebastian. She received a new keel in 1789, a new deck and repairs 1790, was lengthened and received a good repair 1792, and received further repairs in 1795. Biscayneer was last listed in 1800, still with Holdworth as her owner. However, the last mentions of her in Lloyd's List's ship arrival and departure data occurred in January 1796.
