= Biscayneer (1779 ship) =

English cutter

History

Great Britain
- Name: Biscayneer
- Launched: 1779
- Renamed: Retreat (1783)
- Fate: Last listed 1784

General characteristics
- Tons burthen: 80 (bm)
- Complement: 30 (as privateer)
- Armament: 8 × 4-pounder guns (1779-1783)
- Notes: One mast

Biscayneer was a cutter launched in 1779. From at least 1781 on she was a privateer based in Dartmouth, Devon. She captured or recaptured several vessels before her owner-captain sold her in 1783 after the end of the American War of Independence. New owners renamed her Retreat. She was last listed in 1784.

== Career ==
Biscyneir first appeared in Lloyd's Register (LR) in 1782.

Year	Master	Owner	Trade	Source
1782	Crowte	Captain & Co.	Dartmouth privateer	LR

Captain William Croute had acquired a letter of marque on 17 April 1781. Biscayneer's owner was listed as Robert Newman & Co. This was a letter of marque against France. He had earlier acquired letters of marque against the United States, Spain, and Holland. (Note: The size of her crew makes it clear that Biscayneer was a privateer. For instance, during the French Revolutionary Wars Jersey privateers averaged one man for every two tons of burthen; during the Napoleonic Wars the average dropped to one man per five tons. These ratios greatly exceeded the number of men required to crew the vessels. The extra men were intended as prize crews in captured vessels.)

Lloyd's List reported in June 1781 that the Dartmouth privateer Biscayneer, Crowte, master, had taken and sent into Dartmouth a French brig carrying a cargo of wine, brandy and bale goods. Prize money was awarded on 6 December 1781 for the French vessel Valiant.

A year or so later, in July 1782, Lloyd's List reported that the privateer Biscayneer had recaptured Saville, Ray, master, one of the Newfoundland fleet, and brought her into Dartmouth. Biscayneer would have been entitled to salvage for the recapture.

Later in July, Biscayneer, Crowte, master, captured and sent into Dartmouth Modeste, which had been sailing from Ferrol in ballast. The Spanish-built snow of 70 tons (bm), was sold on 19 August.

Vessel	Year	Master	Owner	Trade	Source & notes
Biscayneer	1783	Crowte	Captain & Co.	Dartmouth privateer	LR
Retreat	1783	Robert West	P.Ogier	Dartmouth–Newfoundland	LR

== Fate ==
Retreat was last listed in 1784.
