= United Nations Security Council Resolution 1950 =

UN Security Council Resolution 1950
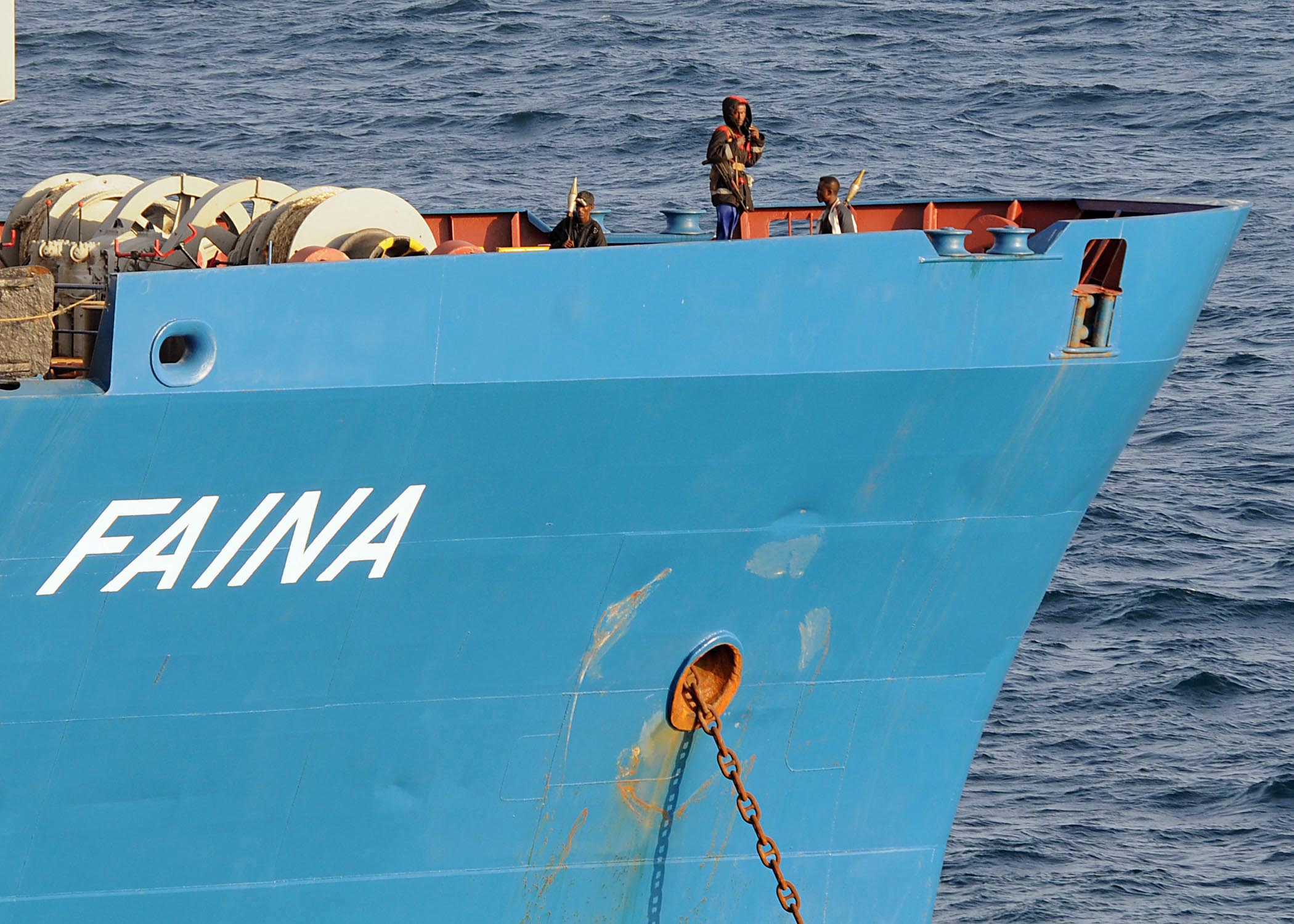
- Somali pirates onboard a hijacked ship
- Date: 23 November 2010
- Meeting no.: 6,429
- Code: S/RES/1950 (Document)
- Subject: The situation in Somalia
- Voting summary: 15 voted for; None voted against; None abstained
- Result: Adopted

Security Council composition
- Permanent members: China; France; Russia; United Kingdom; United States
- Non-permanent members: Austria; Bosnia–Herzegovina; Brazil; Gabon; Japan; Lebanon; Mexico; Nigeria; Turkey; Uganda

United Nations Security Council Resolution 1950, adopted unanimously on November 23, 2010, after recalling previous resolutions on the situation in Somalia, including resolutions 1814 (2008), 1816 (2008), 1838 (2008), 1844 (2008), 1846 (2008), 1851 (2008), 1897 (2009) and 1918 (2010); the Council re-authorised states to intervene in acts of piracy by Somali pirates at sea for a further period of twelve months.

The Transitional Federal Government in Somalia had made several requests for assistance to counter piracy off its coast.

== Observations ==
In the preamble of the resolution, there was concern from the Council at the ongoing threat of piracy and armed robbery at sea against humanitarian vessels delivering aid to Somalia, international navigation and fishing ships. Furthermore, it noted that this threat had extended beyond Somali territorial waters to the western Indian Ocean and children were involved. The Council recognised the instability in Somalia itself had contributed to the piracy issue and there was a need to address its underlying causes, particularly as the TFG had a limited capacity to deal with the problem. It noted that the United Nations Convention on the Law of the Sea had established procedures for dealing with piracy and armed robbery at sea.

The resolution welcomed efforts by the European Union's Operation Atalanta, NATO, and states including China, India, Iran, Japan, Malaysia, South Korea, Russia, Saudi Arabia and Yemen which had all deployed ships and/or aircraft to the region. Meanwhile, there was concern that limited capacity to facilitate the detention and prosecution of pirates had hindered international efforts against pirates off the coast of Somalia. Kenya and the Seychelles were praised for prosecuting pirates and there was a need to support these states, along with others in the region including Yemen to prosecute pirates or incarcerate them in a third state. The Council also addressed those who had been a victim of piracy and commended the International Maritime Organization on developing guidelines in this regard.

== Acts ==
Acting under Chapter VII of the United Nations Charter, the Council reiterated its condemnation of all acts of piracy and armed robbery against vessels off the coast of Somalia. It was concerned at a report of a group monitoring the situation in Somalia that indicated that there was a lack of enforcement of the arms embargo imposed by 733 (1992) and increased ransom payments were fueling the growth in piracy off the coast of Somalia; states were encouraged to share information to prevent violations of the embargo.

The resolution appealed to all states to participate in the fight against piracy with the co-operation of the TFG off the Somali coast while acknowledging the country's rights to offshore resources. Co-operating states were asked not to deny or impair the right of passing ships, and that the arms embargo on Somalia did not apply to weapons and materiel destined for use by international forces. Member states were further urged to improve the capacity of authorities in Somalia to prosecute those planning and undertaking attacks, determine jurisdiction and criminalise piracy under their domestic laws.

The Security Council also directed Interpol and Europol to investigate criminal networks involved in piracy off the coast of Somalia, while the Secretary-General Ban Ki-moon was instructed to report within 11 months concerning the implementation of the current resolution.

== See also ==
- List of United Nations Security Council Resolutions 1901 to 2000 (2009–2011)
- Piracy in Somalia
- Somali Civil War
- Somali Civil War (2009–present)
