= Anti-piracy measures in Somalia =

Anti-piracy in international waters near Somalia

Map of areas under threat by Somali pirates (2005–2010).

Piracy in Somalia had been a threat to international shipping since the beginning of Somalia's civil war in the early 1990s. Since 2005, many international organizations have expressed concern over the rise in acts of piracy. Piracy impeded the delivery of shipments and increased shipping expenses, costing an estimated $6.6 to $6.9 billion a year in global trade in 2011 according to Oceans Beyond Piracy (OBP).

According to the German Institute for Economic Research (DIW), a veritable industry of profiteers also arose around the piracy. Insurance companies significantly increased their profits from the pirate attacks, as the firms hiked rate premiums in response. Since 2013, piracy attacks have decreased in the region due mostly to patrolling by the navies of countries across the world, especially India, China and EU Navfor Operation Atalanta (a joint operation of numerous European navies).

Even so, governments and organizations continued to attempt to address the root causes of piracy instead of deterring pirates with law enforcement measures. Through a combination of these measures and changing political climate, piracy off the coast of Somalia was at an all-time low since the peak in 2010–2011. However, some scholars maintained that the key to keeping the piracy rate low was through a combination of economic and political solutions that targeted the root causes of piracy.

== Obstacles to ending piracy ==
The obstacles to ending piracy were varied and complicated, requiring more than the mere threat of law enforcement to combat piracy. These obstacles included:

Corruption: Piracy required political order to function, including a strong but corrupt host state to allow for the complicated provisions of piracy. Sarah Percy argued that “there is no reason to assume that a more developed Somalia would be a Somalia without pirates.” Organized crime groups often thrived in strong states, owing to corrupt and symbiotic relations with police in countries like the United States and Japan. When pirates shared ransoms with political elites to curry favor and that ransom was used to provide necessary revenue, these regional leaders had little incentive to stop piracy.

Lack of Alternative Employment: Many pirates and potential pirates lacked alternate forms of employment in the area or only had access to less lucrative opportunities. The costs of piracy were vastly outweighed by the benefits, as a single hijacking could result in a ransom of $500,000 to $9 million in a country with a per capita income of $220 in 2009. Without suitable sustainable alternative employment options, pirates would continue risking the costs of piracy given the incredible benefits. Also, piracy is an industry itself that supports those who work in tangentially related businesses and the families of those people, making it more than a single profession to replace.

Victims of piracy: Unlike other organized crime groups that harm the local community, pirates primarily targeted outsiders like large foreign shipping vessels and supported their local community by providing employment and revenue. Rather than destabilizing the region, piracy worked with regional clan hierarchies to provide stability and protection without harming members of the community.

Practices of Shipping Companies: The policies of shipping and insurance companies regarding anti-piracy measures could encourage piracy itself. Shipping companies calculated that the chance of a ship being attacked by pirates was low while anti-piracy measures could be expensive. Insurance companies made the same calculation, and charged low premiums for ransom insurance assuming that there was a low chance of a ship they cover actually getting hijacked. The ships then sailed without much protective equipment measures and almost guaranteed ransom payment from the insurance company, making them easy and lucrative targets for pirates. For example, the liquefied petroleum gas tanker Feisty Gas was captured by Somali pirates in 2005 and ransomed for US$315,000; By 2012, pirates were demanding ransoms in the millions USD, as high as US$50 million for the Panamanian oil tanker Damani Cargo. While different groups of pirates surely negotiated different ransom amounts, the willingness of insurance companies to pay those ransoms only allowed for the ransoms to increase in price.

Law Enforcement and Innovation: As navies and law enforcement ships developed new ways to stop piracy, pirates adapted and developed more efficient techniques and technologies to counter them. R. Marchal argued that antipiracy efforts would not eliminate piracy, but lead only to more violent and costly forms, creating a deadly trap similar to the American "war on drugs". Given the extreme monetary cost of military and private protections for vessels and their low effectiveness, inventing new ways to keep pirates off ships by force would only continue the cycle of piracy without solving the root cause and addressing the need for law enforcement in the first place.

== Development-based solutions ==
Piracy historian Thomas Keating argued that Somalia required a top-down solution to piracy given the variety of issues caused by the political vacuum in 1991 and the economic downturn caused by the tsunami of 2004. These conditions required effective political authority and improved economic opportunities from the government to address the root causes of piracy. Without permanently altering the cost-benefit calculations of piracy through structural and institutional change, the incentives to continue piracy would remain unchanged. One way to increase the cost of piracy for pirates is through increased military patrolling of the region, but this remains expensive to maintain without treating the underlying conditions that lead to piracy. While law enforcement was a protective short-term solution, long-term solutions could be found in on-shore responses that targeted the root causes of piracy in terms of political stability and economic development.

=== Emphasis on the Somali fishing industry ===
Since the 2010s, the Somali fishing industry has become the focus of these development-focused solutions, particularly given its relationship to the piracy industry. Before 1989, Somali fisheries were growing into a thriving and reliable industry, bringing in about US$15 million in exports of fishing products. After a series of droughts ruined the country's grazing lands in the 1970s, the Somali government began actively supporting the fishing sector by organizing fishing villages into cooperatives. The cooperatives provided gear and supplies to fishers and set standard prices for fish, giving fishers “a more stable and viable financial stake." However, the outbreak of civil war in 1991 and the subsequent years of violence halted this institutional progress.

Though export markets for lobster to the Middle East and shark to Asia remained throughout the 1990s, the Somali fishing industry was further hurt by the actions of foreign illegal, unreported, and unregulated (IUU) fishing vessels. These vessels plundered the waters off the coast of Somalia, depleting them of their most valuable stocks while damaging the ecosystem with dredging. These vessels were often fishing for highly migratory species like tuna, or more localized species like lobsters and squids. Foreign vessels targeting tuna and similar species were primarily "large, industrial longline vessels from Asian and European distant water fleets," or were smaller gillnet vessels from neighboring countries such as Yemen and Iran. Both kinds of vessels were much larger than the handlines, nets, and beachseines used by artisanal Somali fishers, and depleted the fisheries much more unsustainably.

A 2015 report by Sarah Glaser called Securing Somali Fisheries argues that foreign fishing could provide important revenue if it were properly licensed and sustainably managed, and that revenue could be reinvested in domestic fishery development. However, fishes caught by these vessels are not reported to the Somali government and artisanal fishers blame their declining catches on these large, industrial vessels. Additionally, IUU vessels have been accused of attacking Somali fishing boats and deliberately destroying their fishing gear. Without institutional protection or support from the international community, some fishers formed groups who “targeted foreign fishing vessels and commercial traffic” to steal equipment and other items if the opportunity arose. But these attacks soon escalated, leading to the first reported hijacking for ransom in 1994 of two Somali High Seas Fishing Company (an Italian-Somali joint venture operated outside the country) fishing vessels.

This stress on Somali fisheries was then compounded by the tsunami of 2004, caused by an earthquake in the Indian Ocean. The tsunami displaced 50,000 people in Somalia and destroyed about 650 kilometers of coast, flattening key fishing infrastructure like boats, piers, and roads in coastal villages. The tsunami also damaged key coral and mangrove habitats, further damaging ecosystem already ravaged by the IUU vessels.

The relationship between these artisanal fishing villages, actions by international industrial fishing vessels, and piracy makes these villages an opportune target for anti-piracy focused development. However, one of the difficulties of targeting these coastal villages is the need for bottom-up solutions that integrate the customs and practices of these communities to create lasting solutions. Anthropologist and political scientist James Scott in Seeing Like a State outlines how states can do more harm than good when they attempt to regulate their people without regard to regional practices and cultural norms. This idea applies to the small coastal fishing communities in Somalia, where clan relationships and agreements govern much of private and public life. In terms of piracy, the mass income from a successful ransom is distributed along these clan relationships and supports the entire community, not just the few pirates engaged in the act. Similarly, in order to effectively develop the Somalian small fishing industry, organizations must consider the perceptions of these fishers towards their own fishery. Given the regional variations from community to community, a single authoritarian top-down approach is more likely to fail than a bottom-up approach reliant on distinct cultural norms and existing practices for a more formal governance system.

Even given these difficulties, Somali fisheries have great potential for economic development. The Glaser report found that the total economic value of domestic fisheries could be US$135 million per year when value is added through the supply chain. At this time, Somalia had 10,000 part-time and full-time fishers, and an additional 30,000–60,000 people associated with different sectors of the domestic fishing economy such as traders, processors, and gear manufacturers. The report argues that much greater economic benefit could be added to the fishing industry, but “landing sites are not equipped with sufficient support services or infrastructure for off-loading, chilling, storing, and transporting fish.” Fishers are concerned with profits lost to competition from foreign industrial vessels and a lack of access to formal markets, and require standardized support and infrastructure from the government to create an economically profitable industry.

=== Somali Fishermen Registration Programme ===
One development-based solution to piracy is the Somali Fishermen Registration Programme, a program to register fishers run by Somali regional governments and the Food and Agriculture Organization (FAO) of the United Nations. The intent of the program is that, by registering, fishers will help gain future development aid while helping to decriminalize maritime populations, since law enforcement officials will be able to reasonably distinguish between fishers and pirates. Before the program, the Somalian government and the United Nations Office on Drugs and Crime (UNODC) used the terms “potential pirates" or "pirates in waiting" to designate what groups to target for development programming. However, this is a vague term that only targets young Somali men living in coastal communities. Instead of leading to capacity building programs, these men were designated as threats and treated with suspicion.

The Somali Fishermen Registration Programme aims to end the surveillance and instability caused by these designations by offering a standard system of fisher registration. This way, fishers could easily prove that they are legal and not piracy vessels, and the decreased arrests of innocent men will help maintain the stability of these coastal communities. The program also has a larger goal of promoting development through increased donor assistance. The registration serves as an assurance to donors that their money exclusively supports fishers and not veiled pirate communities, making donors more inclined to donate to the development of fishing communities. As of 2016, over 5,000 fishermen have registered their biometric data with the programme, though scholar Brittany Gilmer maintains that the data collected needs to be properly analyzed to measure the true effectiveness of the programme.

One critique of this solution is that it does not recognize the cycle of piracy or the causes of piracy in the region. If the Somalian government can create a comprehensive registration and licensure program for fishers, it could do the same for foreign fishing and IUU vessels. This would allow the government to better regulate the amount of fish caught by international vessels while also gathering foreign revenue to reinvest in the domestic fishing industry. This revenue, likely much greater than anything provided by small artisanal fishers, could then be used to create the infrastructure for hygienically storing, processing, and transporting fish products that fishers need to build a sustainable, market-ready industry.

=== Actions by NGOs ===
==== Fairfishing ====
Other solutions that have been advanced by Non-Governmental Organizations (NGOs) also target development in smaller communities. One example is the NGO Fairfishing, which aims to overcome the lack of alternative employment and piracy by transitioning pirates back to fishing. Claus Bindslev, a Danish entrepreneur, started Fairfishing in 2011 after noticing the drop-off of fishing since 1989, when exports of fishery products earned Somalia $15 million prior to the civil war. Fairfishing begins by selling ice to fishermen so they can keep their fish fresh when at sea, then provides equipment and educational programs for local chefs, vendors, fishermen, and householders. By doing so, they hope to support the entire community that depends on piracy revenue, not just focus on the pirates themselves. As of January 2019, Fairfishing reportedly supported the livelihoods of 2,000–3,000 people in the fishing industry and increased the average monthly income for boat owners from $264 in 2012 to $1,288 in 2018. Bindslev says that they aim to support wider development measures in the future by investing the increased revenue from fishing licenses back into the domestic fishing sector, building a strong base for further development.

While this solution does provide more infrastructure and more direct support to fisheries than the Somali Fishermen Registration Programme, it only helps a limited number of fishers and does not provide a long-term, institutional solution. This solution still does not address the fact that one successful ransom alone is much more profitable than a year of fishing. Additionally, building fishing infrastructure without addressing the IUU vessels means the same resentments may resurface, leading to vigilante action from fishers to protect their livelihood, which could evolve into piracy once again. Without a long-term solution standardized for all fishing regions that is supported by the Somali government and successfully manages foreign fishing, supporting small fishing villages is only an unsustainable short-term solution.

== International military presence ==
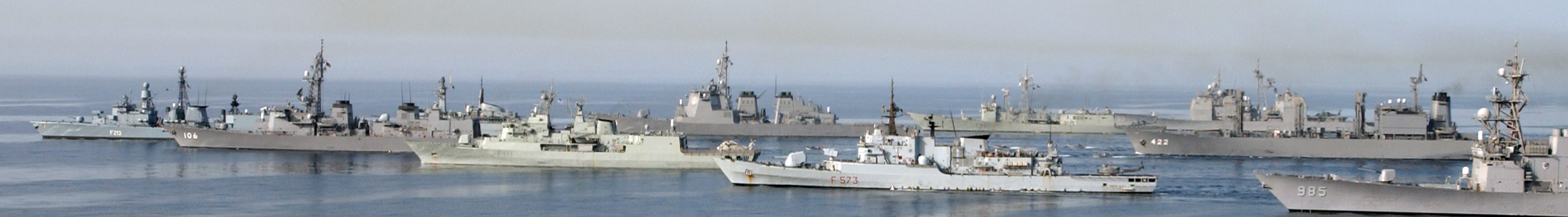
Ships of the multinational fleet Combined Task Force 150, March 2004. From the left: DM Augsburg, JMSDF Samidare, RNZN HMNZS Te Mana, JMSDF Myōkō, MMI Scirocco, Spanish Navy Victoria, US Navy USS Leyte Gulf, JMSDF Towada, USS Cushing

The military response to pirate attacks has resulted in a rare show of unity by countries that are either openly hostile to each other, or at least wary of cooperation, military or otherwise. It is the first time since World War II that all five permanent members of the UN Security Council (UNSC) have deployed forces on the same side.

Currently there are three international naval task forces in the region engaging in counter-piracy operations, with numerous national vessels and task forces entering and leaving for various lengths of time. These forces, which compose the bulk of counter-piracy operations, are Combined Task Force 150 (whose overarching mission is Operation Enduring Freedom), Combined Task Force 151 (which was set up in 2009 specifically to run counter-piracy operations), and the European Union's Operation Atalanta. All counter-piracy operations are coordinated through a monthly planning conference called Shared Awareness and Deconfliction (SHADE). Originally comprising only member nations in NATO, the EU, and the U.S.-led Combined Maritime Forces (CMF) based in Bahrain, it now regularly attracts representatives from over 20 other countries.

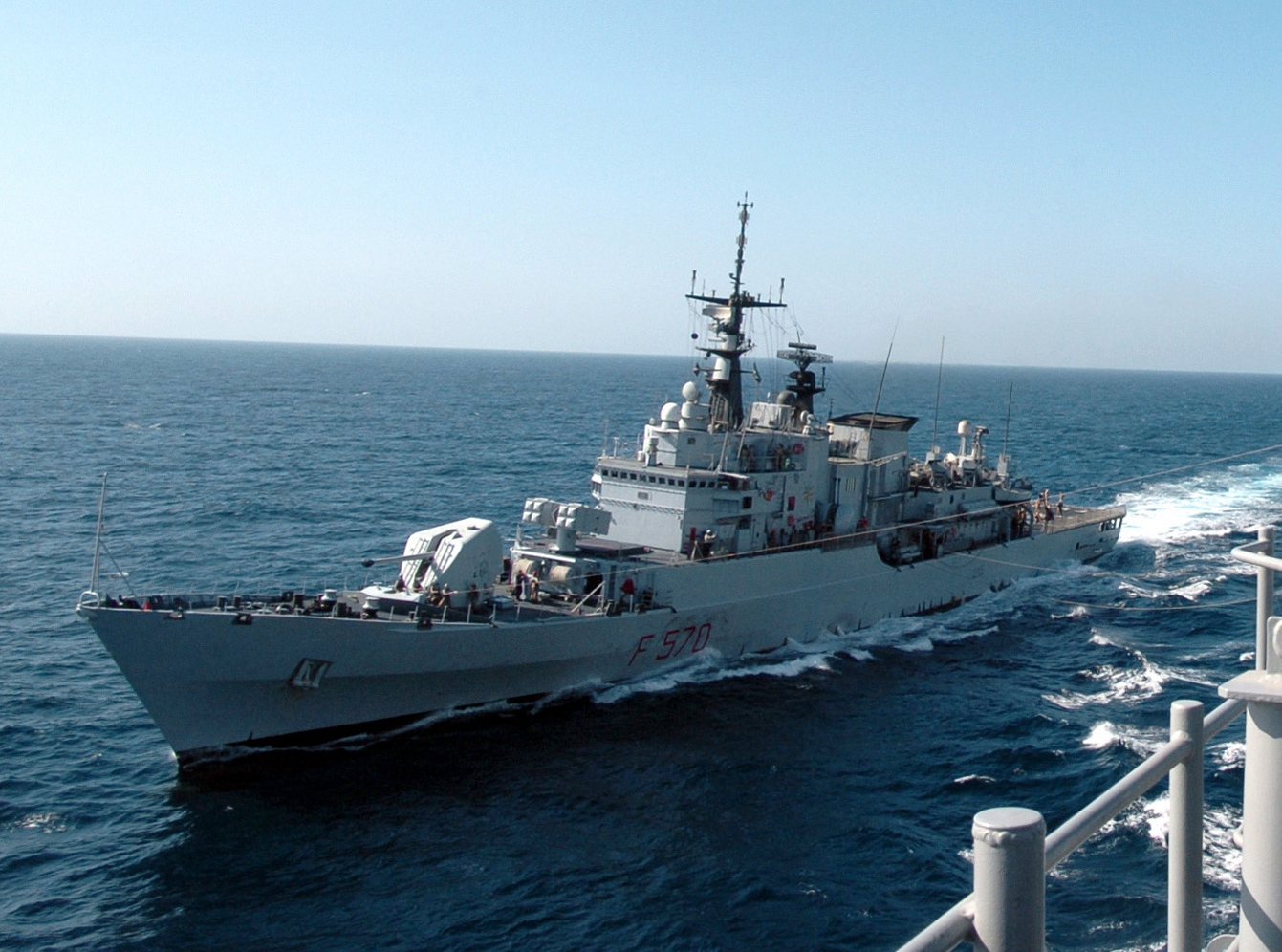
Part of Operation Atalanta, the Italian Maestrale-class frigate Maestrale prepares to take on fuel alongside the amphibious assault ship USS Tarawa during an underway replenishment in the Indian Ocean.

From 2014 onwards, a larger presence of Indian and Chinese navy ships led to a marked reduction of piracy attacks, as they embarked on several joint efforts in rescuing hijacked ships. This includes the famous rescue of the hijacked bulk carrier OS 35 between the coasts of Somalia and Yemen in 2017.

=== European Union ===
In 2008, the European Union, under the Common Security and Defence Policy (CSDP), launched EU NAVFOR Somalia, also known as Operation Atalanta, in support of UNSC Resolutions 1814, 1816, 1838, and 1846 issued that year. The operation works protect humanitarian aid, reduce the disruption to shipping routes, and mitigate the overall de-stabilising of the maritime environment. To date, 26 countries have contributed in some manner to the operation, with 13 EU Member States providing operational assistance through ships, maritime patrol and reconnaissance aircraft, or Vessel Protection Detachment (VPD) teams; these include France, Spain, Germany, Greece, Sweden, Netherlands, Italy, Belgium, United Kingdom (which previously hosted EU NAVFOR Operational headquarters), Portugal, Luxembourg, Malta and Estonia. Nine other EU Member States have participated by providing military staff or onboard units: Cyprus, Romania, Bulgaria, Slovenia, Czech Republic, Hungary, Poland, Ireland and Finland. Finally, four non-EU Member States—Norway, Croatia, Ukraine and Montenegro—have lent resources or personnel to the effort. Since 2009, Royal Norwegian Navy Fridtjof Nansen has regularly taken part in European antipiracy operations. That same year, Bulgaria also announced plans to join the antipiracy operations in the Gulf of Aden and protect Bulgarian shipping, by sending a frigate with a crew of 130 sailors.

At any one time, the European force size fluctuates according to the monsoon seasons, which determine the level of piracy. It typically consists of five to 10 surface combatants (naval ships), one to two auxiliary ships and two to four maritime patrol and reconnaissance aircraft. Including land-based personnel, Operation Atalanta consists of a total of around 2,000 military personnel. EU NAVFOR operates in a zone comprising the south of the Red Sea, the Gulf of Aden and the western part of the Indian Ocean including the Seychelles, which represents an area of 2 million square nautical miles.

The Danish Institute for Military Studies proposed the establishment of a regionally based maritime unit, the "Greater Horn of Africa Sea Patrol", to carry out surveillance in the area to secure free navigation and take on tasks such as fishery inspection and environmental monitoring. The patrol would comprise elements from coastal states in the region, from Egypt in the north to Tanzania in the south, with the support of the states that already have a naval presence in the area.

In 2009, the Swiss government had called for its elite Army Reconnaissance Detachment to combat Somali piracy, though the proposal was ultimately rejected by parliament. Javier Solana, then the European Union's High Representative for Common Foreign and Security Policy, had said that Swiss soldiers could serve under the EU's umbrella.

In May 2012, EU Navfor conducted their first raid on pirate bases on the Somali mainland, destroying five pirate boats. The EU forces were transported by helicopter to the bases near the port of Harardhere, a well-known pirate lair. The operation was carried out with the full support of the Somali government.

In 2011 and 2012 Taiwan worked with the EU's Naval Force in Operation Atalanta to counter piracy off the coast of Somalia.

Additionally, other non-NATO and non-EU countries have, at one time or another, contributed to counter-piracy operations. Australia, China, India, Iran, Japan, South Korea, Malaysia, Pakistan, Russia, Thailand, and Saudi Arabia have all sent ships, surveillance aircraft or personnel to the region, sometimes joining with the existing CTFs, sometimes operating independently.

=== Japan ===
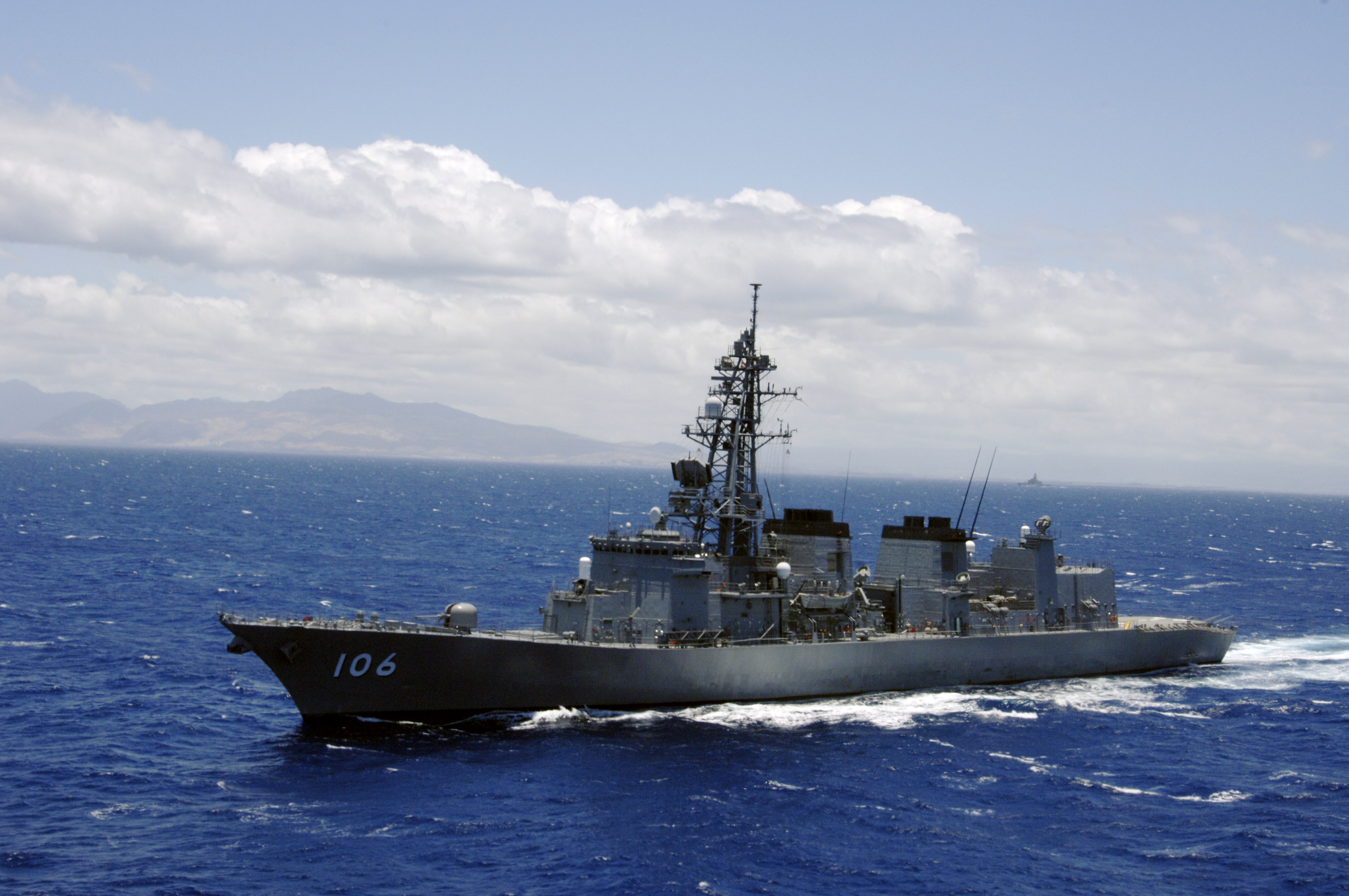
The Murasame-class destroyer Samidare

On 28 January 2009, Japan announced its intention of sending a naval task force to join international efforts to stop piracy off the coast of Somalia. The deployment would be highly unusual, as Japan's non-aggressive constitution means Japanese military forces can only be used for defensive purposes. The issue has been controversial in Japan, although the ruling party maintains this should be seen as fighting crime on the high seas, rather than a "military" operation. The process of the Prime Minister of Japan, Taro Aso, giving his approval is expected to take approximately one month. However, the Japanese Maritime Self-Defense Force (JMSDF) and the Japanese government face legal problems on how to handle attacks by pirates against ships that either have Japanese personnel, cargo or are under foreign control instead of being under Japanese control as current Article 9 regulations would hamper their actions when deployed to Somalia. It was reported on 4 February 2009, that the JMSDF was sending a fact-finding mission led by Gen Nakatani to the region prior to the deployment of the Murasame-class destroyer Samidare and the Takanami-class destroyer Sazanami to the coast of Somalia with a 13-man team composed of Japanese Ministry of Defense personnel, with members coming from the Ministry of Foreign Affairs and the JMSDF to visit Yemen, Djibouti, Oman, and Bahrain from 8 to 20 February. Both JMSDF vessels are units of the 8th Escort Division of the 4th Escort Flotilla based in Kure, Hiroshima Prefecture.

The JMSDF's special forces unit, the Special Boarding Unit is also scheduled to potentially deploy to Somalia. The SBU has been deployed alongside the two destroyers to Somalia on 14 March 2009. According to JMSDF officials, the deployment would "regain the trust of the shipping industry, which was lost during the war."

The JMSDF task force would be deployed off the coast of Somalia for 4 months. In its first mission, the Sazanami was able to ward off pirates attempting to hijack a Singaporean cargo ship. In addition, JMSDF P-3Cs are to be deployed in June from Djibouti to conduct surveillance on the Somali coast. The House of Representatives of Japan has passed an anti-piracy bill, calling for the JMSDF to protect non-Japanese ships and nationals, though there are some concerns that the pro-opposition House of Councillors may reject it. The Diet of Japan has passed an anti-piracy law that called for JMSDF forces to protect all foreign ships traveling off the coast of Somalia aside from protecting Japanese-owned/manned ships despite a veto from the House of Councillors, which the House of Representatives has overturned.

In 2009, the Murasame-class destroyer Harusame and the Asagiri-class destroyer Amagiri left port from Yokusuka to replace the two destroyers that had been dispatched earlier in March 2009. Under current arrangements, Japan Coast Guard officers would be responsible for arresting pirates since SDF forces are not allowed to have powers of arrest.

=== India ===
To protect Indian ships and Indian citizens employed in seafaring duties, the Indian Navy commenced anti-piracy patrols in the Gulf of Aden from 23 Oct 2008 . A total of 21 IN ships have been deployed in the Gulf of Aden since October 2008 in addition to escorting Indian-flagged ships, ships of other countries have also been escorted. Merchant ships are currently being escorted along the entire length of the (490 nm long and 20 nm wide) Internationally Recommended Transit Corridor (IRTC) that has been promulgated for use by all merchant vessels. A total of 1181 ships (144 Indian flagged and 1037 foreign flagged from different countries) have been escorted by IN ships in the Gulf of Aden since October 2008 During its deployments for anti-piracy operations, the Indian naval ships have prevented 15 piracy attempts on merchant vessels.

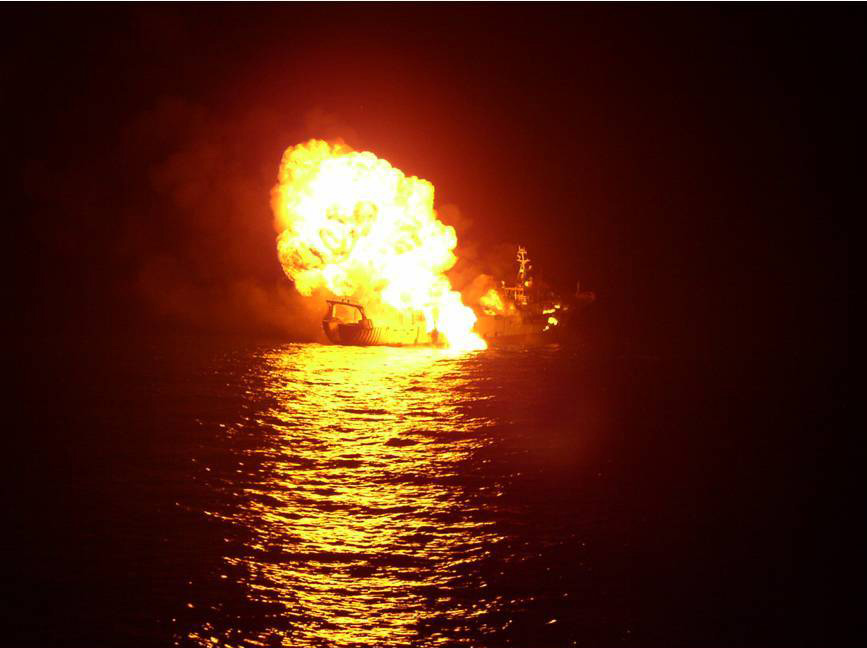
Anti-piracy operations by INS Tabar, in the Gulf of Aden on 18 November 2008

In response to the increased activity of the INS Tabar, India sought to augment its naval force in the Gulf of Aden by deploying the larger INS Mysore to patrol the area. Somalia also added India to its list of states, including the U.S. and France, which are permitted to enter its territorial waters, extending up to 12 nautical miles (22 km; 14 mi) from the coastline, in an effort to check piracy. An Indian naval official confirmed receipt of a letter acceding to India's prerogative to check such piracy. "We had put up a request before the Somali government to play a greater role in suppressing piracy in the Gulf of Aden in view of the United Nations resolution. The TFG government gave its nod recently". India also expressed consideration to deploy up to four more warships in the region. On 14 March 2011, the Indian navy reportedly had seized 61 pirates and rescued 13 crew from the vessel, which had been used as a mother ship from where pirates launched attacks around the Indian Ocean. Meanwhile, a Bangladeshi ship hijacked by pirates last year was freed after a ransom was paid.

air-dropping of the Marine Commandos (PRAHARS) by C-17 aircraft in the same afternoon of 16 Mar 2024

Piracy off the coast of Somalia has witnessed a renewed surge since the early 2020s. In response, the Indian Navy intensified its counter piracy operations, deploying larger task forces supported by the Indian Naval Air Arm and Marine Commandos (MARCOS), the Navy's elite special forces unit. These operations were conducted on a scale significantly greater than earlier missions, reflecting India's evolving maritime strategy under the MAHASAGAR vision.

On 6 January 2024, the guided‑missile destroyer INS Chennai responded to a distress call from the bulk carrier MV Lila Norfolk after an attempted hijacking east of Somalian coast. Indian marine commandos (MARCOS) boarded the vessel, secured all 21 crew which included 15 Indians citizens, and restored control.

INS Sumitra Carries out Successful Anti Piracy Ops 29 Jan 2024

On 28 Jan 2024 Indian Navy had responded to a distress message regarding hijacking of an Iranian flagged Fishing Vessel (FV) Iman, which had been boarded by pirates and the crew taken as hostages. The FV was intercepted by INS Sumitra and following the SOPs and coercive posturing the vessel and her crew of 19 Pakistani Nationals and 17 Iranian Nationals were safely rescued in the early hours of 29 Jan 2024.

A more complex operation followed on 16 March 2024, when the destroyer INS Kolkata intercepted the hijacked cargo ship MV Ruen. After weeks of surveillance and pursuit, Indian forces compelled 35 pirates to surrender and successfully rescued the ship's crew.

Following multiple successful operations against these Somali pirates many of them were captured and brought to Mumbai. In July 2026, a special court sentenced 44 Somali pirates to life imprisonment for crimes committed during the hijacking of vessels off the coast of Somalia and the wider East African region.

=== United States ===
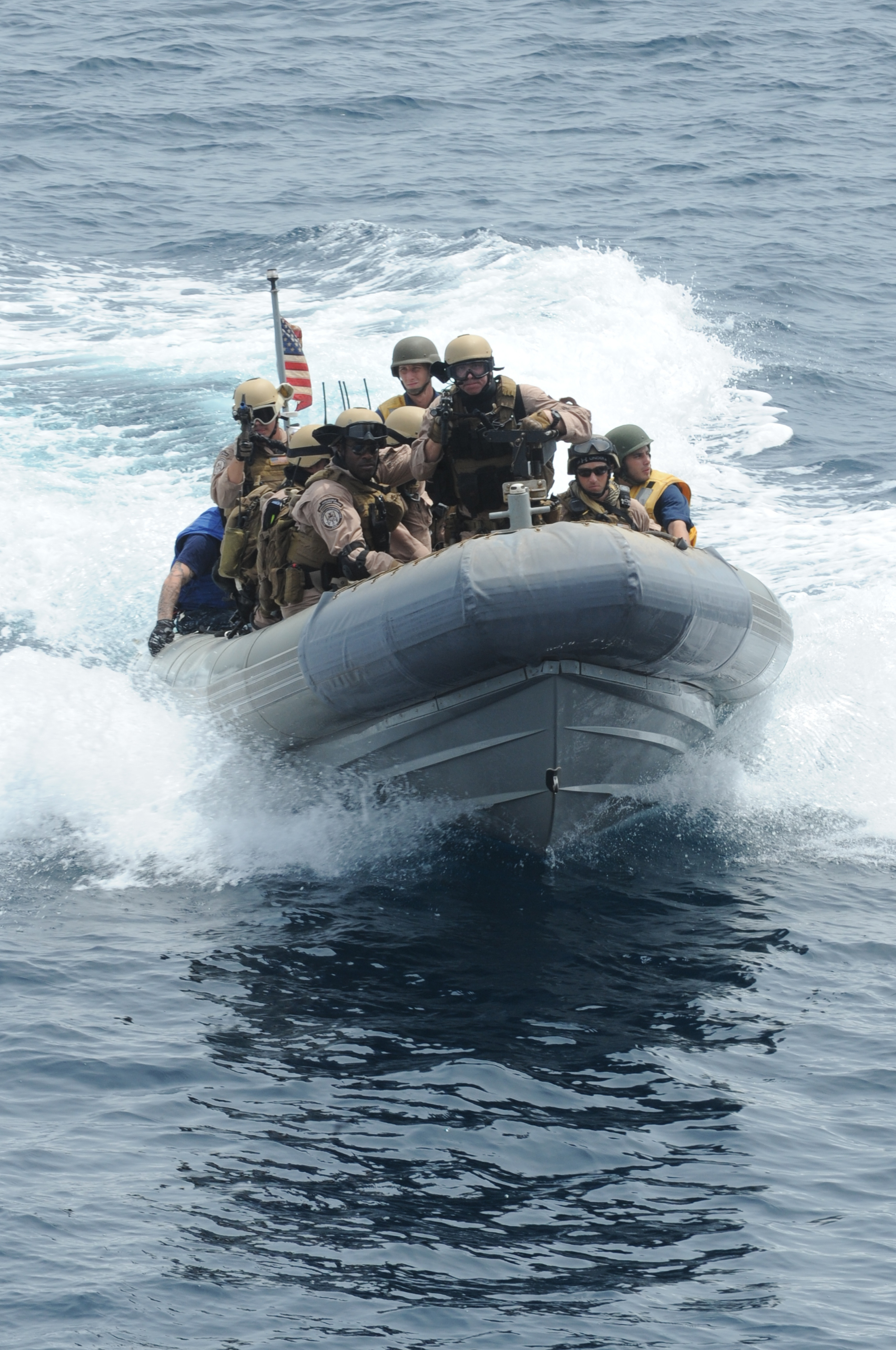
Members of the U.S. Coast Guard Tactical Law Enforcement and the visit, board, search, and seizure team embarked aboard USS Princeton engage in a mock assault operation in the Red Sea.

The U.S. Coast Guard and U.S. Navy both support the actions of the Combined Task Force 151 in their anti-piracy missions in the area.

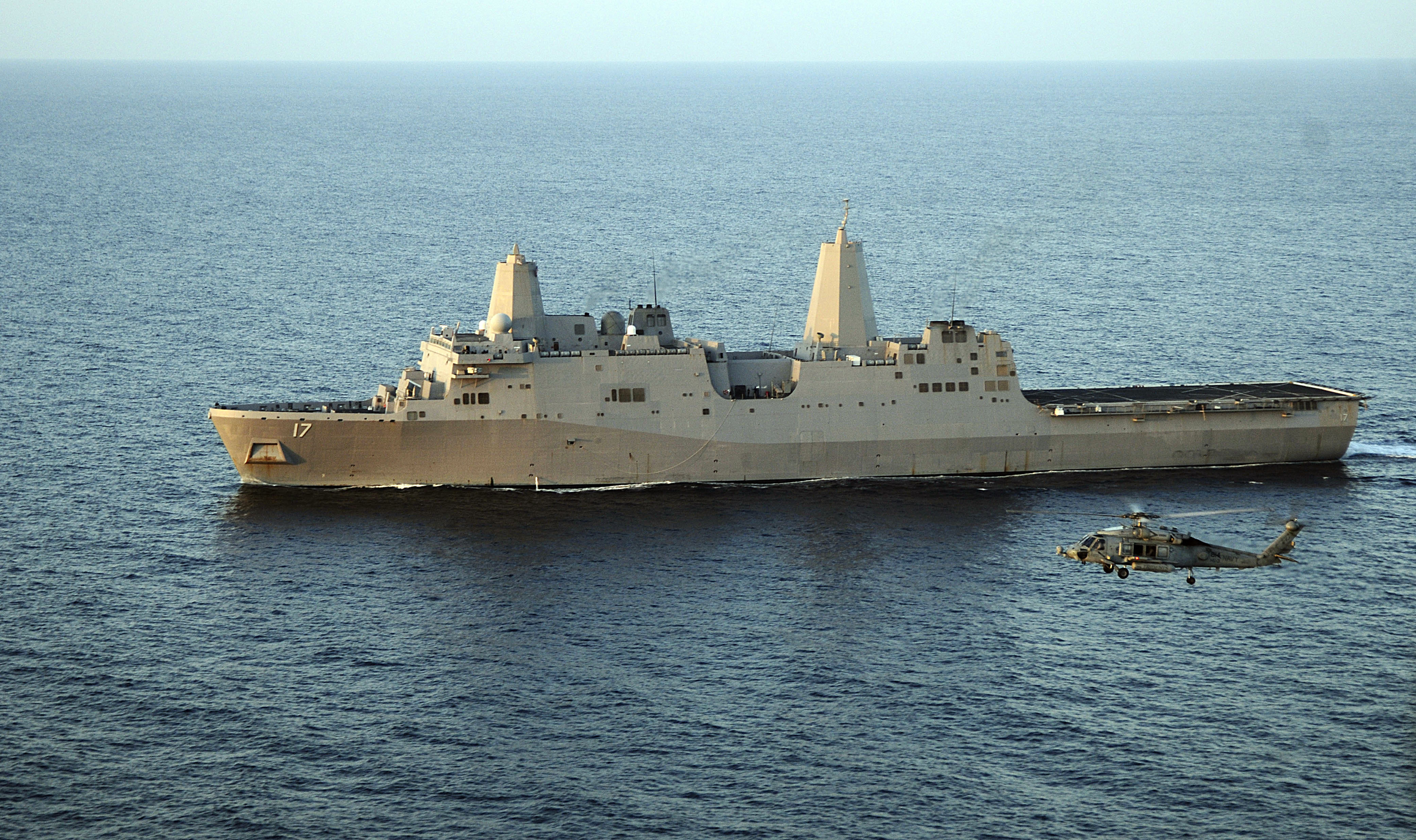
USS San Antonio, CTF-151 flagship

Brian Murphy (Associated Press) reported on 8 January 2009 that Rear Admiral Terence E. McKnight, U.S. Navy, is to command a new multi-national naval force to confront piracy off the coast of Somalia. This new anti-piracy force was designated Combined Task Force 151 (CTF-151), a multinational task force of the Combined Maritime Forces (CMF). The USS San Antonio was designated as the flagship of Combined Task Force 151, serving as an afloat forward staging base (AFSB) for the following force elements:

- 14-member U.S. Navy visit, board, search, and seizure (VBSS) team.
- 8-member U.S. Coast Guard Law Enforcement Detachment (LEDET) 405.
- Scout Sniper Platoon, 2nd Battalion, 6th Marine Regiment, 26th Marine Expeditionary Unit (26 MEU) cross-decked from the USS Iwo Jima.
- 3rd Platoon of the 2nd Battalion, 6th Marine's "Golf" Infantry Company, a military police detachment, and intelligence personnel.
- Fleet Surgical Team 8 with level-two surgical capability to deal with trauma, surgical, critical care and medical evacuation needs.
- Approximately 75 Marines with six AH-1W Super Cobra and two UH-1N Huey helicopters from the Marine Medium Helicopter Squadron 264 (HMM-264) of the 26th MEU cross-decked from the USS Iwo Jima.
- Three HH-60H helicopters from Helicopter Anti-Submarine Squadron 3 (HS-3) cross-decked from the USS Theodore Roosevelt.

Initially, CTF-151 consisted of the San Antonio, USS Mahan (DDG-72), and HMS Portland (F79), with additional warships expected to join this force.

In January 2012, U.S. military forces freed an American and a Danish hostage after a gun battle with pirates during a night-time raid in Somalia. A SEAL team parachuted into the area, before moving on foot where the hostages were being held, 12 miles north of the town of Adado. Nine pirates were killed. There were no U.S. casualties.

=== Other national involvement ===
There have been several naval deployments by national task forces, which in some cases have joined or coordinated with multinational efforts.

On 29 May 2009, Australia pledged its support, redirecting Australian warship HMAS Warramunga from duties in the Persian Gulf to assist in the fighting of piracy. Royal Australian Air Force Lockheed P-3 Orion surveillance planes patrol the ocean between the southern coast of Oman and the Horn of Africa. The anti-piracy flights are operated from UAE.

In April 2011, the Portuguese Air Force contributed to Operation Ocean Shield by sending a P-3C which had early success when on its fifth mission detected a pirate whaler with two attack skiffs.

On 26 December 2008, China dispatched two destroyers; Haikou and Wuhan, and the supply ship Weishanhu to the Gulf of Aden. A team of 16 Chinese Special Forces members from its Marine Corps armed with attack helicopters were on board. Subsequent to the initial deployment, China has maintained a three-ship flotilla of two warships and one supply ship in the Gulf of Aden by assigning ships to the area on a three-month basis.

In February 2010, Danish special forces from the Absalon freed 25 people from the Antigua and Barbuda-flagged vessel Ariella after it was hijacked by pirates off the Somali coast. The crew members had locked themselves into a store-room.

The South Korean navy is also making plans to participate in anti-piracy operations after sending officers to visit the U.S. Navy's 5th Fleet in Bahrain and in Djibouti. The South Korean cabinet had approved a government plan to send in South Korean navy ships and soldiers to the coast of Somalia to participate in anti-pirate operations. The ROKN was sending the Chungmugong Yi Sun-sin class destroyer Munmu the Great to the coast of Somalia. The Cheonghae Unit task force was also deployed in Somalia under CTF 151.

In 2008 Pakistan offered the services of the Pakistan Navy to the United Nations to help combat the piracy in Somalia "provided a clear mandate was given."

The Philippine government ordered the dispatch of a Naval Gunfire Liaison Officer to work with the U.S. Navy's 5th Fleet as part of its contribution against piracy.

Russia also chose to send more warships to combat piracy near Somalia following the announcement from the International Maritime Bureau terming the menace as having gone "out of control."

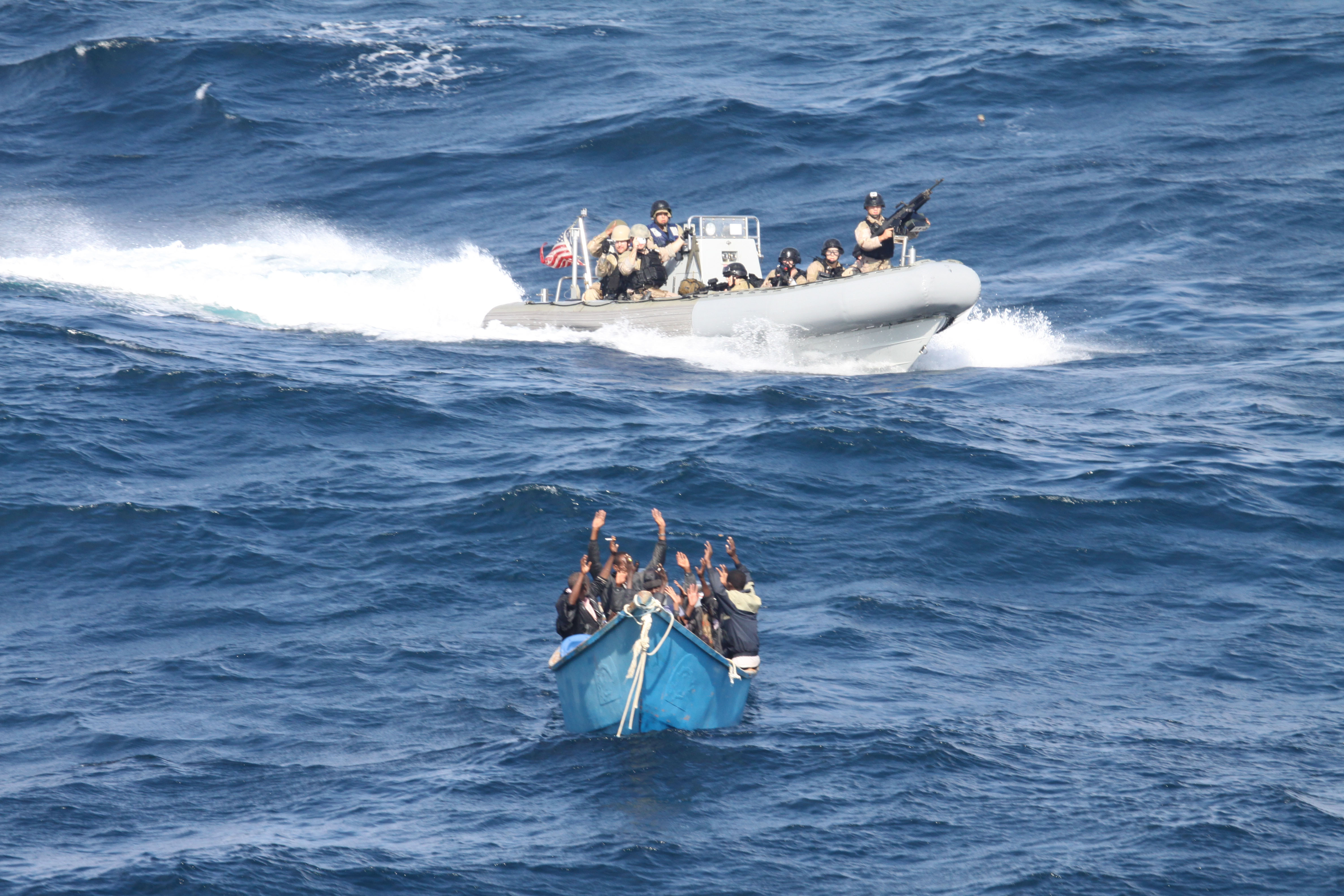
Anti-piracy boarding, December 2011

Due to their proximity to Somalia, the coast guard of Seychelles has become increasingly involved in counter-piracy in the region. On 30 March 2010, a Seychelles Coast Guard Trinkat-class patrol vessel rescued 27 hostages and sank two pirate vessels.

The Spanish Air Force deployed P-3s to assist the international effort against piracy in Somalia. On 29 October 2008, a Spanish P-3 aircraft patrolling the coast of Somalia reacted to a distress call from an oil tanker in the Gulf of Aden. To deter the pirates, the aircraft flew over the pirates three times as they attempted to board the tanker, dropping a smoke bomb on each pass. After the third pass, the attacking pirate boats broke off their attack. Later, on 29 March 2009, the same P-3 pursued the assailants of the German navy tanker Spessart, resulting in the capture of the pirates.

Southern African waters are becomingly an increasingly attractive alternative to the more protected Eastern African sea lanes. The recent rise in counter-piracy patrols is pushing more pirates down the coast line into unprotected areas of the Indian Ocean, which will require the joint navies' current patrols to widen their search area.

A maritime conference was also held in Mombasa to discuss the rising concern of regional piracy with a view to give regional and world governments recommendations to deal with the menace. The International Transport Workers' Federation (ITWF) organised the regional African maritime unions' conference, the first of its kind in Africa. Godfrey Matata Onyango, executive secretary of the Northern Corridor Transit and Transport Coordination Authority said, "We cannot ignore to discuss the piracy menace because it poses a huge challenge to the maritime industry and if not controlled, it threats to chop off the regional internal trade. The cost of shipping will definitely rise as a result of the increased war insurance premium due to the high risk off the Gulf of Aden."

=== Vessels in operation ===
Vessels, aircraft and personnel whose primary mission is to conduct anti-piracy activities come from different countries and are assigned to the following missions: Operation Ocean Shield (NATO and partner states), Atalanta (EU and partner states), Combined Task Force 151, Copper (SADC and partner states), independent missions of Bangladesh, China, Djibouti, Eritrea, India, Indonesia, Iran, Israel, Japan, Kenya, North Korea, Malaysia, the Maldives, Oman, the Philippines, Russia, Sudan, Taiwan, Vietnam, Yemen and other countries. Additionally resources dedicated for the war on terror missions of Combined Task Force 150 and Enduring Freedom – Horn of Africa also operate against the pirates.

Country	Mission	Sailors	Ships	Cost [Mil of USD per annum]	Start	End
(Albania) Albanian Naval Force	?	?	?	?	?	?
(Angola) Angolan Navy	Operation Copper	?	?	?	?	?
(Australia) Royal Australian Navy	Combined Task Force 150	≈250	1 frigate (as part of Operation Slipper duties); 2 AP-3C Orion maritime surveillance aircraft	?	?	?
Bangladesh Navy	?	?	?	?	?	?
(Belgium) Belgian Navy	Operation Atalanta	170	1 Frigate Louise-Marie	?	1 September 2009; 20 Oct 2010	16 December 2009; 20 Jan 2011
(Bulgaria) Bulgarian Navy	Operation Ocean Shield	130	Wielingen class frigate 41 Drazki	?	?	?
(Brazil) Brazilian Navy	?	?	?	?	?	?
(Canada) Royal Canadian Navy	Operation Ocean Shield	240	Halifax-class frigate HMCS Fredericton (FFH 337)	?	November 2009	4 May 2010
(China) People's Liberation Army Navy	People's Liberation Army Navy anti-piracy operations in Somalia	700~800	2 surface combatants, 1 replenishment ship.		6 January 2009 (1st Escort Task Group); 28 April 2018 (32nd Escort Task Group)	16 April 2009 (1st Escort Task Group); Ongoing (32nd Escort Task Group)
(Colombia) Colombian Navy	Operation Atalanta, Operation Ocean Shield	83	1 (OPV ARC 7 de Agosto (47))	?	8 August 2015	27 November 2015
(Comoros) Comorian Coast Guard	Operation Copper	?	?	?	?	?
(Croatia) Croatian Navy	Operation Atalanta	?	?	?	?	?
Cyprus Navy	Operation Atalanta	?	?	?	?	?
(Denmark) Royal Danish Navy	Operation Ocean Shield	300	3 (HDMS Absalon (L16), HDMS Thetis (F357) and HDMS Esben Snare (L17))	?	February 2007; October 2013	April 2009; ?
(Djibouti) Djiboutian Navy		1,500	22 vessels (8 patrol vessels, 12 Coast Guard boats and 2 landing craft)	?	?	?
(Egypt) Egyptian Navy		?	?	?	?	?
(Eritrea) Eritrean Navy		?	?	?	?	?
(Estonia) Estonian Navy	Operation Atalanta	?	?	?	?	?
(Finland) Finnish Navy	Operation Atalanta	120	1 (FNS Pohjanmaa)	(11.6 mil EUR)	5 January 2011; 1 February 2011	May 2011
(France) French Navy	Operation Ocean Shield or Operation Atalanta	?	Germinal, Floréal, La Fayette, avisos, Améthyste	?	?	?
(Germany) German Navy	Operation Atalanta	ca. 300	1 (Frigate Lübeck (F214))	60 (45 Mio. EUR)	8 December 2008	1 December 2012
(Greece) Greek Navy	Operation Ocean Shield	176–196	4	?	?	?
(Iceland) Icelandic Coast Guard	Operation Atalanta	?	?	?	?	?
(India) Indian Navy		1396	Frigate INS Tabar (F44); Destroyer INS Mysore (D60); Frigate INS Godavari; FAC INS Cankarso; WJFAC INS Kalpeni Destroyer INS Chennai OPC INS Sumitra Destroyer INS Kolkata	?	23 October 2008 6 January 2024 28 January 2024 16 March 2024	?
(Indonesia) Indonesian Navy	Operation Ocean Shield	?	?	?	?	?
Islamic Republic of Iran Navy		?	Bandar Abbas; Naghdi; Jamaran	1	?	?
(Ireland) Irish Naval Service	Operation Atalanta	?	?	?	?	?
(Israel) Israeli Navy		?	?	?	?	?
(Italy) Italian Navy	Operation Ocean Shield	240	1 (D560 Durand de la Penne)	?	?	?
Japan Maritime Self-Defense Force		400	1st Escort Division: DD-113 Sazanami, DD-106 Samidare; 2nd Escort Division: DD-102 Harusame, DD-154 Amagiri, 3rd Escort Division: DD-110 Takanami, DD-155 Hamagiri; 4th Escort Division: DD-111 Onami, DD-157 Sawagiri; 5th Escort Division: DD-101 Murasame, DD-153 Yugiri; 6th Escort Division: DD-112 Makinami, DD-156 Setogiri; 7th Escort Division: DD-104 Kirisame, DD-103 Yudachi; 8th Escort Division: DD-105 Inazuma, DD-113 Sazanami; 9th Escort Division: DD-106 Samidare, DD-158 Umigiri; 10th Escort Division: DD-110 Takanami, DD-111 Onami; 11th Escort Division: DD-101 Murasame, DD-102 Harusame; 12th Escort Division: DD-107 Ikazuchi, DD-157 Sawagiri; 13th Escort Division: DD-112 Makinami, DD-153 Yūgiri; 14th Escort Division: DD-113 Sazanami, DD-104 Kirisame; 15th Escort Division: DD-155 Hamagiri, DD-108 Akebono; 16th Escort Division: DD-109 Samidare, DD-156 Setogiri; 17th Escort Division: DD-113 Sazanami, DD-106 Samidare; 18th Escort Division: DD-105 Inazuma, DD-158 Umigiri; 19th Escort Division: DD-110 Takanami, DD-111 Onami; 20th Escort Division: DD-102 Inazuma, DD-154 Amagiri; 21st Escort Division: DD-101 Murasame, DD-107 Ikazuchi; 22nd Escort Division: DD-115 Akizuki, DD-107 Sawagiri; 23rd Escort Division: DD-114 Suzunami, DD-112 Makinami	?	1st Escort Division: 14 March 2009; 2nd Escort Division: 6 July 2009; 3rd Escort Division: 13 October 2009; 4th Escort Division: 29 January 2010; 5th Escort Division: 10 May 2010; 6th Escort Division: 23 August 2010; 7th Escort Division: 1 December 2010; 8th Escort Division: 15 March 2011; 9th Escort Division: 20 June 2011; 10th Escort Division: 11 October 2011; 11th Escort Division: 21 January 2012; 12th Escort Division: 11 May 2012; 13th Escort Division: 31 August 2012; 14th Escort Division: 18 December 2012; 15th Escort Division: 7 April 2013; 16th Escort Division: 26 July 2013; 17th Escort Division: 13 November 2013; 18th Escort Division: 17 March 2014; 19th Escort Division: 15 July 2014; 20th Escort Division: 15 November 2014; 21st Escort Division: 18 March 2015; 22nd Escort Division: 5 July 2015; 23rd Escort Division: 23 October 2015	1st Escort Division: 16 August 2009; 2nd Escort Division: 29 November 2009; 3rd Escort Division: 18 March 2010; 4th Escort Division: 2 July 2010; 5th Escort Division: 15 October 2010; 6th Escort Division: 18 January 2011; 7th Escort Division: 9 May 2011; 8th Escort Division: 11 August 2011; 9th Escort Division: 3 December 2011; 10th Escort Division: 12 March 2012; 11th Escort Division: 5 July 2012; 12th Escort Division: 25 October 2012; 13th Escort Division: 11 February 2013; 14th Escort Division: 10 June 2013; 15th Escort Division: 27 September 2013; 16th Escort Division: 17 January 2014; 17th Escort Division: 17 May 2014; 18th Escort Division: 20 September 2014; 19th Escort Division: 4 January 2015; 20th Escort Division: 20 May 2015; 21st Escort Division: 30 August 2015; 22nd Escort Division: 18 December 2015; 23rd Escort Division: Ongoing
(Jordan) Royal Jordanian Navy		?	?	?	?	?
Kenya Navy		?	?	?	October 2012	?
(North Korea) Korean People's Navy		?	?	?	?	?
(South Korea) Republic of Korea Navy	Combined Task Force 151	300	1 Destroyer (Currently Choi Young DDH-981)	1	16 April 2009	?
(Latvia) Latvian Naval Forces	Operation Atalanta	?	?	?	?	?
(Lithuania) Lithuanian Naval Force	Operation Atalanta	?	?	?	?	?
Madagascar Navy	Operation Copper	?	?	?	?	?
(Malaysia) Royal Malaysian Navy		?	Support Ship Bunga Mas 5	3	July 2009	late 2015
(Maldives) Maldivian Coast Guard		?	?	?	?	?
Maritime Squadron of the Armed Forces of Malta	Operation Atalanta	?	?	?	?	?
National Coast Guard of Mauritius	Operation Copper	?	?	?	?	?
(Montenegro) Montenegrin Navy		?	?	?	?	?
Mozambique Navy	Operation Copper	?	?	?	December 2010	?
(Namibia) Namibian Navy	Operation Copper	?	?	?	?	?
Royal Netherlands Navy	Operation Atalanta	174–202	HNLMS De Zeven Provinciën	1	26 March 2009	August 2010
Royal New Zealand Navy	Operation Ocean Shield	?	HMNZS Te Mana	?	?	?
(Norway) Royal Norwegian Navy	Operation Ocean Shield	?	HNoMS Fridtjof Nansen	?	?	?
Royal Navy of Oman	Operation Ocean Shield	?	?	?	?	?
Pakistan Navy	Combined Task Force 150	177	PNS Badr	?	?	?
(Peru) Peruvian Navy	Operation Ocean Shield	?	?	?	?	?
(Philippines) Philippine Navy		?	?	?	?	?
(Portugal) Portuguese Navy	Operation Ocean Shield	180	1 (Frigate NRP Corte Real – NATO flotilla flagship)	?	June 2009	January 2010
(Poland) Polish Navy	Operation Atalanta	?	?	?	?	?
(Romania) Romanian Navy	Operation Atalanta	236	1 (Type 22 frigate F-221 Regele Ferdinand)	?	1 October 2012	7 December 2012
(Russia) Russian Navy		≈350	3 (Destroyer Admiral Panteleyev (BPK 548), Salvage Tugboat, Tanker	?	April 2009	?
(Saudi Arabia) Royal Saudi Navy	Operation Ocean Shield	?	?	?	?	?
(Serbia) Serbian River Flotilla	Operation Atalanta	?	?	?	?	?
Seychelles Coast Guard	Operation Copper	?	1 (PS Topaz)	?	30 October 2010	?
Republic of Singapore Navy	Combined Task Force 151	240	LST RSS Persistence (209)	?	24 April 2009	?
(Slovenia) Slovenian Navy	Operation Atalanta	?	?	?	?	?
Somali Navy		?	22 (11 ONUK MRTP Class 16 patrol boats, 2 Osa class missile boats, 4 Mol PFT torpedo boats and 5 Poluchat-class patrol boats)	?	June 2009	?
Somaliland Coast Guard		1,000	8 patrol boats	?	?	?
(South Africa) South African Navy	Operation Copper	?	?	?	December 2010	?
(Spain) Spanish Navy	Operation Ocean Shield	423	2 Frigates (F86 Canarias and F104 Méndez Núñez)	?	?	?
(Sudan) Sudanese Navy	?	?	?	?	?	?
(Sweden) Swedish Navy	Operation Atalanta	152	3 (OPV HSwMS Carlskrona)	?	14 April 2010 6 April 2013	15 November 2010 August 2013
(Taiwan) Republic of China Navy		?	?	?	?	?
Tanzania Naval Command	Operation Copper	?	?	?	February 2012	?
(Thailand) Royal Thai Navy	Combined Task Force 150	371 including 20 marine special warfare task force	2 (OPV HTMS Pattani; Replenishment Ship HTMS Similan)	8.757 (270 Mil THB)	10 September 2010	14 January 2011
(Turkey) Turkish Navy	Operation Ocean Shield	503	2 (Frigates TCG Giresun (F 491), TCG Gokova (F 496))	?	?	?
(Ukraine) Ukrainian Navy	Operation Ocean Shield, Operation Atalanta	180	1 (U130 Hetman Sahaydachniy)	?	10 October 2013; 3 January 2014	3 January 2014; 26 February 2014
United Arab Emirates Navy		?	?	?	?	?
(United Kingdom) Royal Navy	Operation Ocean Shield	950	HMS Cumberland; HMS Montrose; HMS Northumberland; HMS Monmouth	?	?	?
United States Navy	Operation Ocean Shield, Combined Task Force 150, Combined Task Force 151	?	US 5th Fleet	?	?	?
Vietnam People's Navy		?	?	?	?	?
(Yemen) Yemeni Navy		?	?	?	?	?

== Somalia ==
=== Puntland ===
Between 2009 and 2010, the government of the autonomous Puntland region in northeastern Somalia enacted a number of reforms and pre-emptive measures as a part of its officially declared anti-piracy campaign. The latter included the arrest, trial and conviction of pirate gangs, as well as raids on suspected pirate hideouts and confiscation of weapons and equipment; ensuring the adequate coverage of the regional authority's anti-piracy efforts by both local and international media; sponsoring a social campaign led by Islamic scholars and community activists aimed at discrediting piracy and highlighting its negative effects; and partnering with the NATO alliance to combat pirates at sea. In May 2010, construction also began on a new naval base in the town of Bandar Siyada, located 25 km west of Bosaso, the commercial capital of Puntland. The facility is funded by Puntland's regional government in conjunction with Saracen International, a UK-based security company, and is intended to assist in more effectively combating piracy. The base will include a center for training recruits, and a command post for the naval force. These numerous security measures appear to have borne fruit, as many pirates were apprehended in 2010, including a prominent leader. Puntland's security forces also reportedly managed to force out the pirate gangs from their traditional safe havens such as Eyl and Gar'ad, with the pirates now primarily operating from Hobyo, El Danaan and Harardhere in the neighboring Galmudug region.

Following a Transitional Federal Government-Puntland cooperative agreement in August 2011 calling for the creation of a Somali Marine Force, of which the already established Puntland Maritime Police Force (PMPF) would form a part, the Puntland administration resumed training of PMPF naval officials. The Puntland Maritime Police Force is a locally recruited, professional maritime security force that is primarily aimed at fighting piracy off the coast of Somalia, safeguarding the nation's marine resources, and providing logistics support to humanitarian efforts. Supported by the United Arab Emirates, PMPF officials are also trained by the Japanese Coast Guard.

=== Galmudug ===
Government officials from the Galmudug administration in the north-central Hobyo district have also reportedly attempted to use pirate gangs as a bulwark against Islamist insurgents from southern Somalia's conflict zones; other pirates are alleged to have reached agreements of their own with the Islamist groups, although a senior commander from the Hizbul Islam militia vowed to eradicate piracy by imposing sharia law when his group briefly took control of Harardhere in May 2010 and drove out the local pirates.

By the first half of 2010, these increased policing efforts by Somali government authorities on land along with international naval vessels at sea reportedly contributed to a drop in pirate attacks in the Gulf of Aden from 86 a year prior to 33, forcing pirates to shift attention to other areas such as the Somali Basin and the wider Indian Ocean.

=== Somaliland ===
The government of Somaliland, a self-declared republic that is internationally recognized as an autonomous region of Somalia, has adopted stringent anti-piracy measures, arresting and imprisoning pirates forced to make port in Berbera. According to officials in Hargeisa, Somaliland's capital, the Somaliland Coast Guard acts as an effective deterrent to piracy in waters under its jurisdiction.

=== Southern and Central Somalia ===
During the six month rule of the Islamic Courts Union (ICU) in 2006, pirate activity completely ceased due to aggressive anti-piracy operations conducted by the courts. According to ICU officials, the organization was sending large contingents of troops into the central Somali regions to crack down on pirate operations based there. In one notable incident, ICU forces would storm a hijacked United Arab Emirates registered ship, and recaptured it after a battle with the pirates aboard the vessel.

== Arab League summit ==
Following the seizure by Somali pirates of an Egyptian ship and a Saudi oil supertanker worth $100 million of oil, the Arab League, after a meeting in Cairo, has called for an urgent summit for countries overlooking the Red Sea, including Egypt, Saudi Arabia, Sudan, Somalia, Jordan, Djibouti and Yemen. The summit would offer several solutions for the piracy problem, in addition to suggesting different routes and looking for a more secure passageway for ships.

Another possible means of intervention by the Red Sea Arab nations' navy might be to assist the current NATO anti-piracy effort as well as other navies.

== United Nations ==
In June 2008, following a letter from the Somali Transitional Federal Government (TFG) to the President of the UN Security Council requesting assistance for the TFG's efforts to tackle acts of piracy off the coast of Somalia, the UN Security Council unanimously passed a resolution authorizing nations that have the consent of the Transitional Federal Government to enter Somali territorial waters to deal with pirates. The measure, which was sponsored by France, the United States and Panama, lasted six months. France initially wanted the resolution to include other regions with pirate problems, such as West Africa, but were opposed by Vietnam, Libya and most importantly by veto-holding China, who wanted the sovereignty infringement limited to Somalia.

The UN Security Council adopted a resolution on 20 November 2008, that was proposed by Britain to introduce tougher sanctions against Somalia over the country's failure to prevent a surge in sea piracy. The US circulated a resolution that called upon countries having naval capacities to deploy vessels and aircraft to actively fight against piracy in the region. The resolution also welcomed the initiatives of the European Union, NATO and other countries to counter piracy off the coast of Somalia. US Alternate Representative for Security Council Affairs Rosemary DiCarlo said that the draft resolution "calls on the secretary-general to look at a long-term solution to escorting the safe passage of World Food Programme ships." Even Somalia's Islamist militants stormed the Somali port of Harardheere in the hunt for pirates behind the seizure of a Saudi supertanker, the MV Sirius Star. A clan elder affiliated with the Islamists said "The Islamists arrived searching for the pirates and the whereabouts of the Saudi ship. I saw four cars full of Islamists driving in the town from corner to corner. The Islamists say they will attack the pirates for hijacking a Muslim ship."

On 16 December 2008, the UN Security Council unanimously adopted a tougher resolution, allowing for the first time international land and sea occupations in the pursuit of pirates. Four ships, a Chinese fishing boat, a Turkish cargo ship, a Malaysian tug, and a private yacht were seized by pirates that same day. Resolution 1851 takes current anti-piracy measures a step further.

A Russian drafted resolution, Security Council Resolution 1918, adopted on 27 April 2010, called on all states to criminalise piracy and suggested the possibility of establishing a regional or international tribunal to prosecute suspected pirates.

Pursuant to resolution 1976 and resolution 2015, both adopted in 2011, the United Nations Security Council has called for more structured international support for Somalia's Transitional Federal Government as well as Puntland and other regional authorities in Somalia in creating counter-piracy special courts, laws, prisons and policing capabilities. Resolution 1976 also encourages regional and federal actors to engage in more effective marine resource defence against illegal fishing and toxic waste dumping in areas under their jurisdiction.

On 19 November 2012 UN Security Council held an open meeting discuss piracy. The debate, which was the first held by the Security Council about this subject, was called by Indian Ambassador Hardeep Singh Puri and heard more than 40 speakers from different countries and international organizations.

== Private initiatives ==
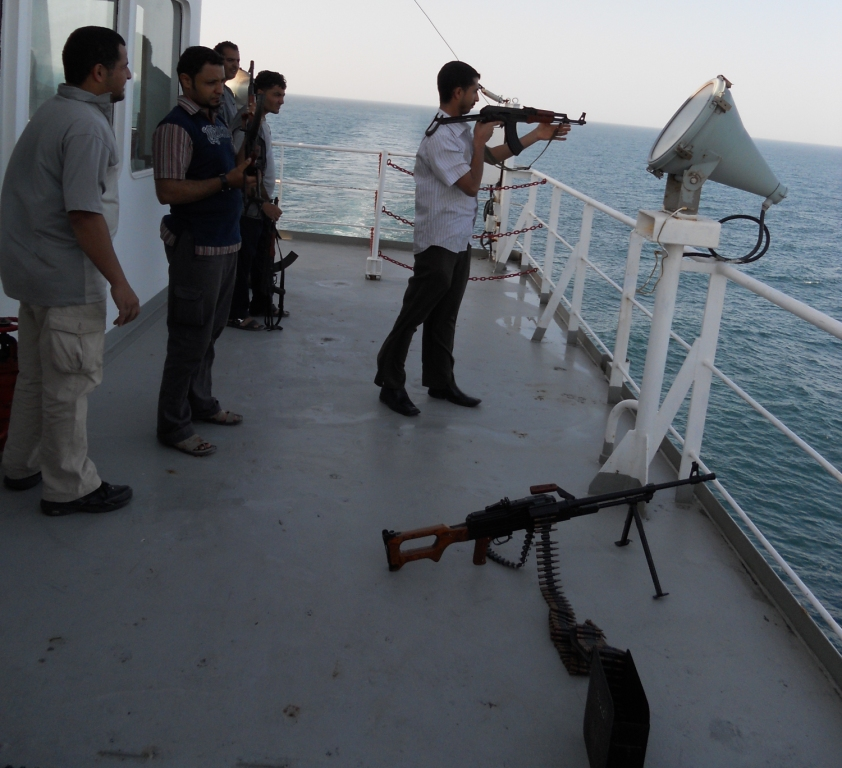
Armed guard escort on a merchant ship

There have been reports of pirates repelled by private initiatives. One such case would have occurred by the end of 2008, by armed personnel of transportation entrepreneur Barthe Cortes. VSOS, a Seychelles-based company was authorized in 2008 by the authorities of Seychelles to operate armed maritime security guards. From this strategic hub the company extends its operations throughout the Indian Ocean.

Other vessel owners and shipping line companies have also hired private security outfits for assistance. One such firm is Espada Logistics and Security Group based in San Antonio, Texas, whose security officers provide on-board protection from a ship's point of entry to its point of destination. They also offer anti-piracy training en route to the Gulf of Aden, and have teamed up with African Shipping Lines, a leading international shipping line company, to provide security to vessels traveling along the coast of East Africa. Another private venture is MUSC, which specializes in counterpiracy and ship security.

As of 21 May 2012, Nick Maroukis of Triton Risk MSS states that not a single vessel with armed privately contracted maritime security contractors has been successfully hijacked by the pirates. A table of incidents from October to December 2011 shows pirate successes against armed and unarmed vessels. Pirates have steadily ventured further across the Lloyd's Joint War Committee (JWC) designated Piracy High Risk Area (HRA) to evade naval patrols and search for easier targets. This is just one example of how pirates adapt their tactics to counter-piracy measures. Triton Risk MSS has produced a short analysis which highlights other probable shifts in pirate tactics, techniques and procedures in 2012/13. The maritime security industry has been actively trying to introduce self-regulation for private contracted armed security companies (PCASP) since 2010. Main industry actors are: Security Association for the Maritime Industry (SAMI) and the International Association of Maritime Security Professionals (IAMSP). Governmental initiatives include the UN's International Maritime Organization (IMO) and the Swiss government's International Code of Conduct (ICOC) initiative. As of spring 2012, one of the largest ship owners/operators organizations, BIMCO, has launched another initiative to bring standards into the maritime security industry though use of PCASP contracts for its members (called GUARDCON) and ISO accreditation and certification standards for PCASPs.

== Legal actions ==
=== Jurisdiction ===
In June 2008, following a letter from the Transitional Federal Government of Somalia (TFG) to the President of the UN Security Council requesting assistance for the Somali authorities' efforts at tackling acts of piracy in the Indian Ocean, the UN Security Council unanimously passed a declaration authorizing nations that have the consent of the Somali government to enter Somali territorial waters to deal with pirates.

Suspected pirates captured in international waters have been tried in various countries. The Somali government questioned the authority of foreign countries to prosecute the pirates abroad. In response, the European Union attempted to focus the prosecutions closer to the Horn of Africa littoral by involving nearby territories.

In January 2011, a report by UN Special Advisor on piracy Jack Lang proposed that two special anti-piracy courts should be established in the stable northern Puntland and Somaliland regions of Somalia. It also recommended that a Somali extraterritorial tribunal be created in neighbouring Tanzania. This prospective court would be subject to Somali law and function, but would be based outside Somalia due to the conflict that was then taking place in the southern part of the country. However, the latter proposal was rejected by the Somali authorities. This, along with legal, financial and security-related concerns, prompted the US government to also oppose the recommendation of a Somali extraterritorial tribunal. A British House of Commons Foreign Affairs Committee report issued in January 2012 likewise rejected the idea as well as that of an international court, and recommended instead that special anti-piracy courts operating under national laws in nearby states should be established.

In 2011, the autonomous Puntland and Somaliland regions of Somalia each reached a security-related memorandum of understanding with the Seychelles. Following the framework of an earlier agreement signed between the Transitional Federal Government and the Seychelles, the memorandum called for the transfer of convicted pirates to prison facilities in Puntland and Somaliland. The TFG and the two regional administrations later signed a similar cooperative agreement with Mauritius in 2012, with the island nation scheduled to take on pirate suspects for trial and prosecution starting in June of the year.

Kenya concurrently began serving as an additional location for trials of pirate suspects. In October 2012, its Court of Appeal stated that the country's courts could try pirates captured on international waters, as universal jurisdiction permitted all states to do so. In January 2013, the Somali government indicated that pirates interned in Kenya would be transferred to Somalia. The plan was conceived by the Somali authorities, although no specific date for the transfer was announced.

As Somalia further develops its courts and prison facilities in coordination with the UNODC Counter Piracy Program, pirates held in other territories are expected to be transferred for domestic detention.

=== Trials ===
In May 2010, a Yemeni court sentenced six Somali pirates to death and jailed six others for 10 years each, for hijacking a Yemeni oil tanker, killing one cabin crew member and leaving another missing in April 2009.

In May 2010, another Somali, Abduwali Muse, pleaded guilty in a New York federal court to seizing a United States-flagged ship Maersk Alabama and kidnapping its captain and was sentenced to 33 years imprisonment.

The first European trial of alleged Somali pirates opened in the Netherlands in May 2010. They were arrested in the Gulf of Aden in January 2009, when their high-speed boat was intercepted by a Danish frigate while allegedly preparing to board the cargo ship Samanyolu, which was registered in the Dutch Antilles. The pirates were sentenced to five years in prison, which was less than the maximum possible sentence. It is unlikely the men will be returned to Somalia after their sentence, as Somalia is considered too dangerous for deportation. One of the five has already applied for asylum in the Netherlands. Consequently, there are concerns that trials in European courts would encourage, rather than deter, pirates. However, trials are continuing in Europe. More recently in Paris, November 2011, five men were sentenced to between four and eight years; one man was acquitted. A trial also continues in Hamburg, Germany. In Italy, nine Somali pirates had been tried and sentenced to prison terms of 16 and 19 years. They had been found guilty of attempted kidnapping for extortion and illegal possession of firearms, in connection with 10 October 2011 attack and seizure of an Italian-owned cargo vessel, the Montecristo.

On 1 April 2010, the USS Nicholas (FFG-47) was on patrol off the Somali coast when it took fire from men in a small skiff. After chasing down the skiff and its mothership, US military captured five Somalis. Judge Raymond A. Jackson, a Federal District Court judge in Norfolk, Virginia, threw out the piracy charge, which dates from enactment in 1819 when piracy was defined only as robbery at sea. The penalty for piracy is mandatory life in prison. The U.S. government appealed the ruling. In March 2011 the five Somalis were sentenced to life for piracy to run consecutively with the 80-year term. In the same month 13 Somalis and one Yemeni suspected of hijacking and killing four Americans aboard a yacht made their first appearance in federal court in Norfolk.

On 28 January 2011, pursuant to the naval engagement of the pirate mother vessel MV Prantalay (a hijacked Thai trawler) by the INS Cankarso, the Indian Navy and the Indian Coast Guard killed 10 pirates and apprehended 15, while rescuing 20 Thai and Burmese fishermen that were held aboard the ship as hostages. The rescued fishermen were sent to Kochi while the 15 pirates, of Somali, Ethiopian and Kenyan origin, were taken to Mumbai. The Mumbai Police confirmed that they registered a case against the pirates for attempt to murder and various other provisions under the Indian Penal Code and the Passports Act for entering the Indian waters without permission.

In May 2012, a U.S. federal appeals court upheld the convictions of five pirates, a decision which prosecutors described as the first United States-based piracy convictions in 190 years.

In October 2013, Mohamed Abdi Hassan ("Afweyne") was arrested in Belgium for having allegedly masterminded the 2009 hijacking of the Belgian dredge vessel Pompei, abducted its crew, and participated in a criminal organization. According to federal prosecutor Johan Delmulle, Hassan was responsible for the hijacking of dozens of commercial ships from 2008 to 2013. He is currently awaiting trial in Bruges, the first prosecution of a pirate leader by the international community.

== 2013 collapse of piracy ==
By December 2013, the US Office of Naval Intelligence reported that only nine vessels had been attacked during the year by the pirates, with zero successful hijackings. Control Risks attributed this 90% decline in pirate activity from the corresponding period in 2012 to the adoption of best management practices by vessel owners and crews, armed private security on board ships, a significant naval presence, and the development of onshore security forces.

In January 2014, the MV Marzooqah initially sent out a distress signal indicating that it was under attack by pirates in the Red Sea. However, the container vessel turned out instead to have been seized by Eritrean military units as it entered Eritrea's territorial waters.
