= International piracy law =

International law that is meant to protect against piracy

International piracy law is international law that is meant to protect against piracy. Throughout history and legal precedents, pirates have been defined as hostis humani generis, Latin for "the enemy of all mankind". The United Nations has codified much of the law in the United Nations Convention on the Law of the Sea (UNCLOS), which defines different types of piracy and ways to combat it.

Piracy threatens maritime security and the legitimate uses of the seas for peaceful purposes and the freedom of navigation (freedom of the seas, Mare Liberum). All ships and countries are free to trade and navigate the oceans, a right which is threatened by piracy. A 2008 report by the International Maritime Organization found 4,821 incidents of modern piracy and maritime armed robbery in the period 1984 to 2008. In these incidents, 6 crew were killed, 42 assaulted, 774 held hostage and 38 crew are unaccounted for.

== Piracy law as codified in UNCLOS ==
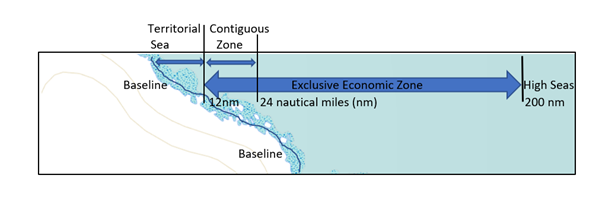
UNCLOS maritime zones

UNCLOS codified the laws of piracy in Articles 100 to 110. Article 108 is not strictly piracy law, but for the suppression of illicit traffic of narcotic drugs at sea. The Max Planck Encyclopedia of International Law argues that article 109 on pirate broadcasting by radio transmission is now an out-dated grandfather clause, given the liberalisation of broadcasting licence systems. However, it argues the clause may still be relevant in allowing states to prevent hostile propaganda broadcasts. The piracy articles of UNCLOS replicate Articles 14 to 21 of the 1958 Geneva Convention on the High Seas. It has been ratified by 168 states and there are 157 signatories (accepted but not signed). The treaty is accepted as customary international law.

The flag state normally has jurisdiction and responsibility for a vessel on the high seas. The term hostis humani generis (enemy of all mankind) was applied to pirates in the 1927 Lotus case of the Permanent Court of International Justice, the League of Nations equivalent of the International Court of Justice. As such, there is universal jurisdiction over piracy on the high seas. Pirates are denied protection of the flag state and all states have the right to seize a pirate ship on the high seas and to prosecute in national courts.

== Harvard Draft Convention on Piracy ==
The 1932 Convention of Piracy (CoPir) was provided as one of the thirteen commentaries presented in the 1930 League of Nations Codification Conference on International Law. It held piracy as not a crime against the law of nations; giving faith to the jurisdiction of individual states to repress piracy.

Article 2 of CoPir stated that "Every state has jurisdiction to prevent piracy and to seize and punish persons and to seize and dispose of property because of piracy. This jurisdiction is defined and limited by this convention."

Article 3 of CoPir stated that "Piracy is any of the following acts, committed in a place not within the territorial jurisdiction of any state:" whereupon it listed three heads, and included: "Any act of violence or of depredation committed with intent to rob, rape, wound, enslave, imprison or kill a person or with intent to steal or destroy property, for private ends without bona fide purpose of asserting a claim of right, provided that the act is connected with an attack on or from the sea or in or from the air..."

Article 6 of CoPir stated that "In a place not within the territorial jurisdiction of another state, a state may seize a pirate ship or a ship taken by piracy and possessed by pirates, and things or persons on board."

Article 4 of CoPir stated that "1. A ship is a pirate ship when it is devoted by the persons in dominant control to the purpose of committing an act" of piracy. "A ship does not cease to be a pirate ship after the commission of an act described [here] as long as it continues under the same control."

=== Influences ===
The 1958 Geneva Convention on the High Seas had drawn on the research of the Harvard Draft. The definition of piracy was adopted from the Geneva Convention unto the UNCLOS definition of Piracy verbatim. To this day, the Harvard Draft adds to the debate of what constitutes piracy.

== Defining piracy ==
The 1982 United Nations Convention on the Law of the Sea defines in Article 101 (Definition of Piracy):

Piracy consists of any of the following acts:

(a) any illegal acts of violence or detention, or any act of depredation, committed for private ends by the crew or the passengers of a private ship or a private aircraft, and directed:

(i) on the high seas, against another ship or aircraft, or against persons or property on board such ship or aircraft;
(ii) against a ship, aircraft, persons or property in a place outside the jurisdiction of any State;

(b) any act of voluntary participation in the operation of a ship or of an aircraft with knowledge of facts making it a pirate ship or aircraft;
(c) any act of inciting or of intentionally facilitating an act described in subparagraph (a) or (b).

=== Piracy on the high seas ===
The 1958 Geneva Convention on the High Seas states that piracy occurs on the high seas. Article 101(1)(a) of the UNCLOS definition also states that piracy occurs on the high seas. Referring to Article 58(2) of UNCLOS shows that piracy can also occur in the exclusive economic zone. Violent acts against ships in the territorial sea of any State cannot be piracy under international law. Violent acts in the territorial sea are armed robbery under the law of the International Maritime Organization.

Ships have been captured off the coast of Somalia and crews held for ransom since the 1990s, with armed groups in the territorial sea and the government unable to enforce the law. Somali pirates attacked ships carrying humanitarian supplies to the Somali population.

The United Nations Security Council Resolution 1816 on Piracy in Somalia provided an exception, that piracy could occur in the Territorial Sea of Somalia. This allowed states to cooperate with the Transitional Federal Government of Somalia in order to suppress piracy. Resolution 1816 meant that a ship could chase a pirate vessel in a “reverse hot pursuit”, from the high seas into the territorial sea of Somalia.

=== Two-ship requirement ===
The condition in Article 101(a)(i) UNCLOS definition is known as the “two-ship” requirement. In the 1961 Santa Maria hijacking of a Portuguese passenger ship, the perpetrators were already on board posing as passengers, so there were not two ships. Their motives were solely political. Although there was extreme violence this did not meet the UNCLOS piracy definition of motivation (mens rea) for “private ends”.

In the 1985 Achille Lauro hijacking the ship was captured in the Mediterranean by Palestinian Extremists who were already on board. Although there was violence on board the ship, because there were not 'two ships' this could not be seen as piracy. After this, the International Maritime Organization developed the 1988 Convention for the Suppression of Unlawful Acts against the Safety of Maritime Navigation (SUA Convention). The 1988 SUA Convention and its 2005 Protocol are United Nations treaties.

=== Maritime environmental activism ===
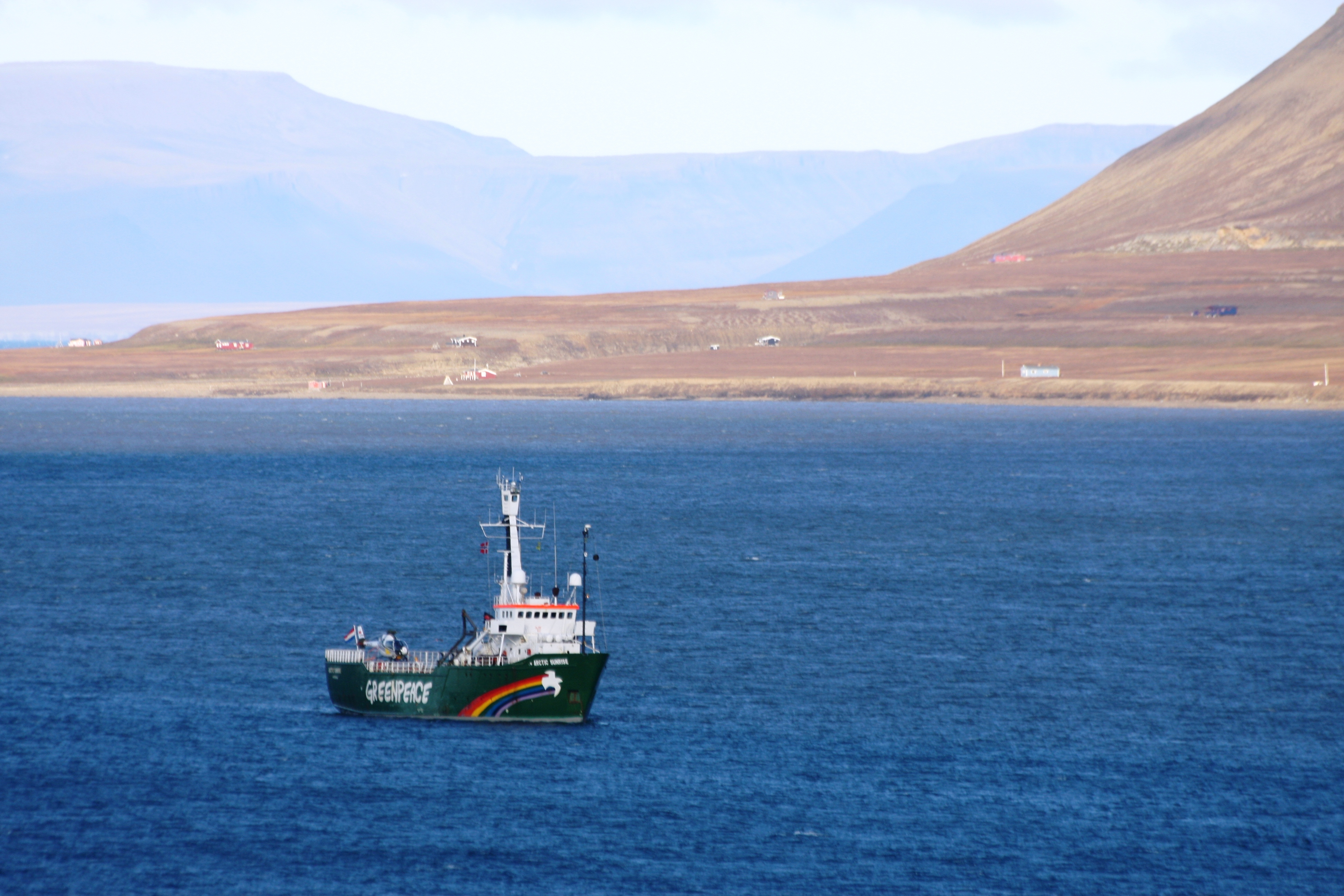
Greenpeace ship Arctic Sunrise.

In the 2013 case Institute of Cetacean Research v. Sea Shepherd Conservation Society, a United States district court held that the actions of Sea Shepherd vessels against Japanese whaling vessels fell within the UNCLOS piracy definition of 'private ends'.

In the 1986 case Castle John v. NV Mabeco, the court ruled that a Greenpeace vessel committed piracy in acts against a Dutch Vessel, which was discharging waste at sea. The court ruled that Greenpeace motivation to 'alert the public of harmful discharge to the environment' fell within the UNCLOS piracy definition of 'private ends.'

In the Arctic Sunrise case before the International Tribunal for the Law of the Sea, the Greenpeace ship Arctic Sunrise staged protests in the waters of the Russian Exclusive Economic Zone, centred around the oil platform Prirazlomnoya. The crew were initially charged with piracy, but the charge was later dropped by Russia.

== Other measures against piracy ==
=== UNSC resolutions ===
United Nations Security Council Resolutions on Somalia Piracy

The collapse of the Somali State in the 1990s opened the region to illegal, unreported and unregulated fishing (IUU), as well as the unregulated disposal of toxic waste by rich States. Somalia Pirates claim that they take to the seas in order to protect pillaged local resources, and in response to lost income. A series of UNSC Resolutions concerned piracy in Somalia. The United Nations Security Council Resolution 1918 adopted in 2010, called on States to establish national piracy laws and to prosecute Somalia pirates.

=== Soft law ===
The Contact Group on Piracy of the Coast of Somalia (CGPCS) brings together States and International organisations, aiming for a holistic response to the root causes of piracy. The International Maritime Organisation Djibouti Code of Conduct (DCoC) is a soft law approach, where Arab and African States collaborate in maritime security responses to piracy and armed robbery. The Shared Awareness and Deconfliction Mechanism (SHADE) was set up in 2008 as an informal forum for States and Organisations to collaborate on counter-piracy measures off the Horn of Africa.

=== Maritime domain awareness ===
An integrated understanding of threats at sea has been labelled maritime domain awareness. Coordination between international naval operations, defensive actions of the shipping industry and agreements such as the CGPCS and the DCoC have contributed to repressing piracy and armed robbery. Three regional agreements to combat piracy are the DCoC, the Regional Cooperation Agreement on Combatting Piracy and armed Robbery against Ships in Asia (ReCAAP) and The Yaounde Code of Conduct (YCoC). The regional agreements enabled development of best practices to combat piracy and global transfer of expertise. The Jeddah Amendment to the DCoC included other illicit maritime activities and is a possible model for integrated maritime security, beyond its regional scope.

=== Private security and insurance ===
Private insurance has been seen as a guarantee of certainty and security, but it also has a moral economy of risk. For centuries Lloyd's of London has offered marine insurance and underwritten piracy risk. The nature of the peril of piracy requires specialist underwriting to match the level of risk with the premium. With ship ransoms of US$3 million per ship, armed security teams offered to transit with ships in heightened risk areas at a cost of US$60,000 for a team of four. From 2005 Piracy has been managed by the marine war branch of Lloyd's, the Joint War Committee (JWC). Lloyd's insurance of piracy is a governance mechanism.

== Law of kidnap and ransom ==
The 1979 Hostages Convention is an international treaty against the taking of hostages. The 1998 SUA Convention and its 2005 Protocol similarly address acts of terrorism. The offence of hostage taking is the seizure and detention and threat to kill, injure and detain a hostage. Under the 1988 SUA Convention it is an offence to seize control of a ship by force and act with violence against a person on the ship.

These three conventions apply to piracy off Somalia, as there is intention to hold the crew hostage for ransom and to seize a ship violently. State parties must take offenders into custody for trial or extradition, but this is only allowed in the territorial sea. Pirates seized in the territorial sea of Somalia can be delivered to Kenya for trial and prosecution under the transfer rules of the SUA Convention.

Any persons assisting or accomplance to an offence, under the SUA Convention, of seizing a ship can be prosecuted. The UNCLOS definition of piracy in Article 101 indicates that conspiracy to, or aiding and abetting piracy could be prosecuted. There are very few cases of prosecution on the grounds of aiding piracy.

== See also ==
- Anti-piracy measures in Somalia
