= United Nations Security Council Resolution 1918 =

United Nations Security Council resolution

UN Security Council Resolution 1918
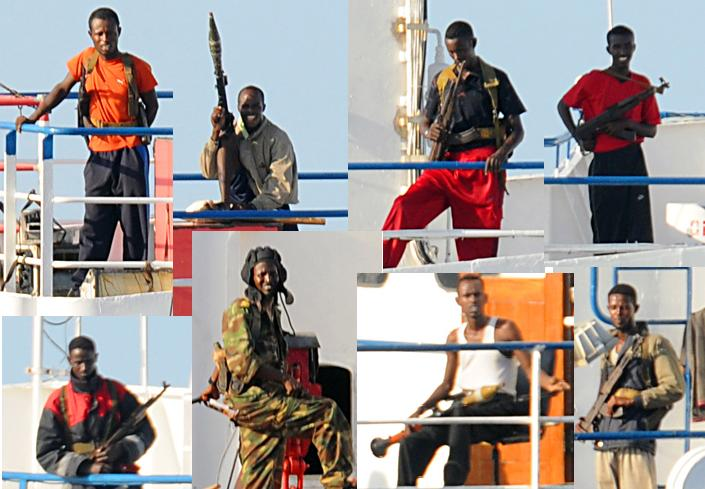
- Somali pirates
- Date: 27 April 2010
- Meeting no.: 6,301
- Code: S/RES/1918 (Document)
- Subject: The situation in Somalia
- Voting summary: 15 voted for; None voted against; None abstained
- Result: Adopted

Security Council composition
- Permanent members: China; France; Russia; United Kingdom; United States
- Non-permanent members: Austria; Bosnia–Herzegovina; Brazil; Gabon; Japan; Lebanon; Mexico; Nigeria; Turkey; Uganda

United Nations Security Council Resolution 1918, adopted unanimously on April 27, 2010, after recalling resolutions 1814 (2008), 1816 (2008), 1838 (2008), 1844 (2008), 1846 (2008), 1851 (2008) and 1897 (2008) on Somalia, the Council called on countries to criminalise piracy within their national laws.

The Security Council remained concerned by the threat that piracy and armed robbery against vessels posed to the situation in Somalia, nearby states and international shipping. The United Nations Convention on the Law of the Sea was also reaffirmed as was the need to address problems caused by the limited capacity of the judicial system in Somalia and neighbouring states to effectively prosecute those suspected of being involved in piracy. In this regard, the United Nations Office on Drugs and Crime, Contact Group on Piracy off the Coast of Somalia (CGPCS) and other international organisations were assisting in enhancing the judicial systems in Somalia, Kenya, the Seychelles and other countries in the region to convict pirates.

The resolution welcomed efforts by the European Union, NATO and other states acting in a national capacity for their efforts to suppress acts of piracy in co-operation with the Transitional Federal Government off the coast of Somalia. The efforts of Kenya, the Seychelles and other states were praised following the prosecution of pirates in their countries, consistent with international humanitarian law. There was concern that some suspected pirates had been released without facing justice, due to uncertainty over who could prosecute them.

In the second part of the resolution, sponsored by Russia, the Council reiterated that the failure to prosecute those responsible for acts of piracy undermined anti-piracy efforts by the international community. Countries were called upon to criminalise piracy within their national laws and to detain and prosecute suspected pirates off the coast of Somalia in accordance with international human rights law. Progress made towards the implementation of the International Maritime Organization Djibouti Code of Conduct was praised, with the Council further calling upon participants to implement it fully as soon as possible. Finally, the Secretary-General Ban Ki-moon was requested within three months to report on options for prosecuting and imprisoning those responsible for piracy and armed robbery, including the possibility of establishing a regional or international tribunal.

== See also ==
- List of ships attacked by Somali pirates
- List of United Nations Security Council Resolutions 1901 to 2000 (2009–2011)
- Piracy in Somalia
