= Child pirate =

Juvenile used in piracy

In keeping with the Paris Principles definition of a child soldier, the Roméo Dallaire Child Soldiers Initiative defines a child pirate as any person below 18 years of age who is or who has been recruited or used by a pirate gang in any capacity, including children – boys and/or girls – used as gunmen in boarding parties, hostage guards, negotiators, ship captains, messengers, spies or for sexual purposes, whether at sea or on land. It does not only refer to a child who is taking or has taken a direct part in kinetic criminal operations.

Children may volunteer to participate in piratical activities (usually on account of socioeconomic desperation, familial suggestion or peer influence) or they may be forcibly abducted by piratical gangs.

== Causes ==
There are a number of reasons why an adult pirate commander would view children as being of significant tactical value. These perceptions render children vulnerable to abduction or forced recruitment. As noted by Carl Conradi:

Like warlords, pirate commanders recruit children because they are vulnerable and easily manipulated; fearless and ignorant of the long-term consequences of their actions; inexpensive to maintain; plentiful in developing countries most afflicted by piracy; small in stature and therefore nimble; easily indoctrinated; largely invulnerable to legal proceedings; and because they pose a moral challenge to their enemies.

In other cases, children may volunteer to participate in piratical activities. However, as asserted by the Canada-based Roméo Dallaire Child Soldiers Initiative, "'voluntary' enlistment must be understood in terms of the limited choices and circumstances that may exist in the context of a particular country." If a child is extremely poor, has been displaced from their home, has been separated from their family, has limited educational opportunities or has been exposed to conflict, there is an increased likelihood that they will view piracy as a legitimate vehicle for social advancement.

== National and international mechanisms and laws ==
In the absence of specific international legislation on juvenile maritime piracy, the precise age of a child's criminal responsibility when committing piratical acts differs from country to country. There are, however, a number of international conventions pertaining to either maritime law or children's rights that may provide some guidance as to the proper handling of child pirates.

=== United Nations Convention on the Law of the Sea ===
While the United Nations Convention on the Law of the Sea (UNCLOS, 1982) does not discuss children's involvement in maritime criminal activities, it does provide a clear definition of piracy. According to Article 101, piracy is:

a) any illegal acts of violence or detention, or any act of depredation, committed for private ends by the crew or passengers of a private ship or a private aircraft, and directed:

i. on the high seas, against another ship or aircraft, or against persons or property on board such ship or aircraft;
ii. against a ship, aircraft, persons or property in a place outside the jurisdiction of any State;

b) any act of voluntary participation in the operation of a ship or of an aircraft with knowledge of facts making it a pirate ship or aircraft;
c) any act of inciting or intentionally facilitating an act described in subparagraph (a) or (b).

UNCLOS does recognise universal jurisdiction over the crime of piracy but it only applies to criminal acts that take place on international waters. If an act of piracy occurs within a country's territorial waters, it is a matter of state jurisdiction and prosecution.

=== International Labour Organisation Worst Forms of Child Labour Convention ===
Article 3 of the International Labour Organisation's (ILO) Worst Forms of Child Labour Convention (No. 182, 1999) stipulates that:

...the term the worst forms of child labour comprises:

a) all forms of slavery or practices similar to slavery, such as the sale and trafficking of children, debt bondage and serfdom and forced or compulsory labour, including forced or compulsory recruitment of children for use in armed conflict;
b) the use, procuring or offering of a child for prostitution, for the production of pornography or for pornographic performances;
c) the use, procuring or offering of a child for illicit activities, in particular for the production and trafficking of drugs defined in the relevant international treaties;
d) work which, by its nature or the circumstances in which it is carried out, is likely to harm the health, safety or morals of children.

Insofar as participation in any form of maritime criminality is dangerous (and indeed, potentially lethal), child piracy clearly constitutes a worst form of child labour.

According to the convention, a child is any person who is below the age of 18.

As of April 2013, eight countries had not signed ILO Convention No. 182. These include Cuba, Eritrea, India, the Marshall Islands, Myanmar, Palau, Somalia and Tuvalu. Two of these countries – India and Somalia – are currently detaining and prosecuting alleged child pirates.

=== United Nations Convention on the Rights of the Child ===
Like ILO Convention No. 182, Article 1 of the United Nations Convention on the Rights of the Child (1990) specifies that a child is any human being below the age of 18 years. However, the same article adds a caveat to the effect that a country's minimum age of criminal responsibility may be lower than 18, as stipulated by national law.

Other sections that may have some bearing upon the status of child pirates include Article 6, in which, "States Parties recognize that every child has the inherent right to life," and that, "States Parties shall ensure to the maximum extent possible the survival and development of the child."

Article 19(1) affirms that, "States Parties shall take all appropriate legislative, administrative, social and educational measures to protect the child from all forms of physical or mental violence, injury or abuse, neglect or negligent treatment, maltreatment or exploitation, including sexual abuse, while in the care of parent(s), legal guardian(s) or any other person who has the care of the child." This clause may be particularly relevant in cases where a child's parents have forced him or her to participate in piratical activity, or where the State is responsible for detaining, interrogating, trying and/or incarcerating a captured child pirate.

Article 32(1) echoes ILO Convention No. 182 by stipulating that, "States Parties recognize the right of the child to be protected from economic exploitation and from performing any work that is likely to be hazardous or to interfere with the child's education, or to be harmful to the child's health or physical, mental, spiritual, moral or social development."

Article 35 says that, "State Parties shall take all appropriate national, bilateral and multilateral measures to prevent the abduction of, the sale of or traffic in children for any purpose or in any form." When a piratical gang permanently separates a child from his or her family, this may constitute an act of child trafficking.

Article 37(a) affirms that, "No child shall be subjected to torture or other cruel, inhuman or degrading treatment or punishment. Neither capital punishment nor life imprisonment without possibility of release shall be imposed for offences committed by persons below eighteen years of age." Likewise, Article 37(c) states that, "Every child deprived of liberty shall be treated with humanity and respect for the inherent dignity of the human person, and in a manner which takes into account the needs of persons of his or her age. In particular, every child deprived of liberty shall be separated from adults unless it is considered in the child's best interests not to do so and shall have the right to maintain contact with his or her family through correspondence and visits, save in exceptional circumstances."

Lastly, Article 39 stipulates that, "State Parties shall take all appropriate measures to promote physical and psychological recovery and social reintegration of a child victim of: any form of neglect, exploitation or abuse; torture or any other form of cruel, inhuman or degrading treatment or punishment; or armed conflicts. Such recovery and reintegration shall take place in an environment which fosters the health, self-respect and dignity of the child."

=== Other regional mechanisms and conventions ===
The third version of the Best Management Practices to Deter Piracy off the Coast of Somalia and in the Arabian Sea Area (June 2010) recommends a sample follow-up report that should be filled by the captain of any vessel that has come under pirate attack. While the report does solicit certain details concerning the offending raiding party – such as the number of constituent pirate members, their physical appearance and the weapons that were used – it does not ask for the estimated ages of pirates.

The Regional Cooperation Agreement on Combating Piracy and Armed Robbery against Ships in Asia (ReCAAP) is a multilateral pact that facilitates information sharing between signatory countries. The reporting mechanism that it establishes does not specifically call for the collection of disaggregated data pertaining to the ages of captured pirates.

According to the UN Office on Drugs and Crime, the UN Contact Group on Piracy off the Coast of Somalia is in the midst of drafting an apprehension and transfer protocol for juvenile pirates who are captured by international navies operating in the Horn of Africa region.

=== National laws and judicial mechanisms ===
All three of the main Somali sub-regions (i.e., South-Central, Puntland and Somaliland) have signed memoranda of understanding (MoUs) with the governments of Mauritius and the Seychelles, allowing for the transfer of convicted pirates to prison facilities in Somalia. These MoUs, however, do not specify clear standard operating procedures for processing and/or transferring pirates who are determined to be under the age of 18. Kenya is also trying suspected Somali pirates but no prisoner transfer agreement is currently in place.

According to UNICEF-Somalia, some 100 child pirates are currently being detained in a prison in Bosaso, Puntland. A second prison for juvenile pirates with a capacity of 100 is being built in Garoowe, while a 70-person prison for juvenile pirates is being built in Somaliland.

The Republic of Somaliland's Juvenile Justice Law (2007) raised the age of criminal responsibility from 14 to 15 years and established separate judicial mechanisms for minors, such as child-specific courts of the first instance and appellate courts. However, Somaliland's Law on Combating Piracy (2012) does not make any specific reference to persons under the age of 18.

The Somali sub-region of Puntland does not have any specific legislation pertaining to child protection, though as of April 2013, a policy on orphans and other vulnerable children had been tabled in Parliament.

India's Piracy Bill (2012) does not make any specific reference to persons under the age of 18.

== Incidents ==
=== Nigeria ===
According to the Roméo Dallaire Child Soldiers Initiative:

"In Nigeria, young unemployed men, in particular, are frequently enticed into the organized pirate gangs operating in the Delta region by "...promised riches, fancy cars, luxury goods and weapons," such that these gangs are increasingly composed of younger members. It has also become recognized that in Nigeria, social mobility and the struggle for survival now necessitate the use of violence as "...society gradually stopped recognizing merit and force became a plausible avenue to the top of social and economic strata with drug trafficking, smuggling and other perceived moneymaking ventures like armed robbery, seen as ways to get rich quickly."

=== Somalia ===
One of the most egregious instances of child maritime piracy off the coast of Somalia is recounted on the Canadian Naval Review's Broadsides forum:

"In March 2011, Indian naval forces operating in the Arabian Sea captured the Mozambique-flagged fishing vessel Vega 5. Somali pirates had kidnapped the trawler's original crew several months earlier. They subsequently refurbished the stolen craft into an operationally significant "mothership". Of the 61 marauders who were arrested during the Indian raid, an astonishing 25 persons – or some 40% of the entire crew – were determined to be under the age of 15. Indeed, ensuring reports revealed that four of the pirates could not have been older than 11."

The Vega 5 hijacking does not appear to be an isolated incident. The Broadsides article continues to report that:

"During a recent visit to the autonomous Somali region of Puntland, former UN Special Representative for Children and Armed Conflict, Ms. Radhika Coomaraswamy, was told by a jailed adult pirate that his colleagues and superiors were increasingly reliant upon child recruits when attempting seize ships for ransom. Many of the adults who are responsible for directing piracy operations only do so from their homes on land, rather than from motherships on the high seas. As such, according to Ms. Coomaraswamy, the individuals actually sent out to, "...do the dangerous stuff are the young children, between the ages of 15, 16 and 17."

The Roméo Dallaire Child Soldiers Initiative has determined that a significant proportion of those Somali pirates who are currently being tried internationally are actually under the age of 18. In India, 38 out of 61 pirates (62%) facing trial are juveniles; in Germany, 3 out of 10 (30%) are children; and in the United States, all three Somali pirates currently facing trial are under the age of 18.

=== Sri Lanka ===
The Roméo Dallaire Child Soldiers Initiative has noted that:

"As part of its military strategy, the LTTE [Liberation Tigers of Tamil Eelam] maintained "...the most comprehensive naval networks among the [US-designated] foreign terrorist organizations...". This branch of operations, called the Sea Tigers, launched a multitude of attacks upon international cargo ships, including several – such as the Greek-registered freighter Stillus Limassul – that were carrying weapons to be used by the Sri Lankan military. Like its army, the LTTE's naval branch actively recruited and deployed child soldiers. Indeed, there is evidence that during periods of LTTE-sponsored disarmament of child soldiers, underage members of the Sea Tigers were surreptitiously retained, as they had frequently received resource-intensive training that made them particularly strong military assets." It was also very common for "...very young Tamils (some as young as 13) [to be] pressed into service to fill the [naval] ranks as the long-running insurgency depleted LTTE manpower."
