= United Nations Security Council Resolution 1976 =

UN Security Council Resolution 1976
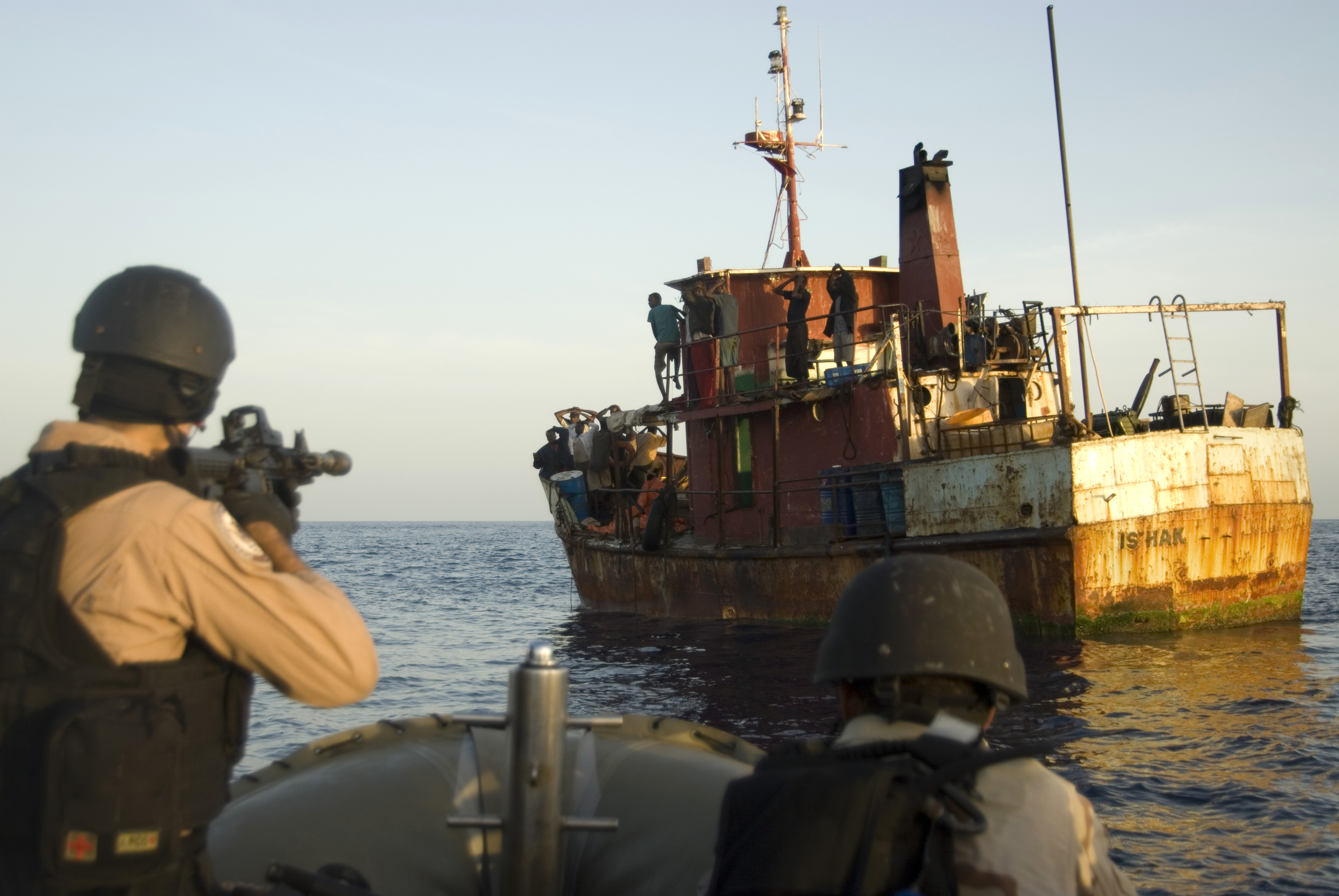
- Capture of suspected Somali pirates in the Gulf of Aden
- Date: 11 April 2011
- Meeting no.: 6,512
- Code: S/RES/1976 (Document)
- Subject: The situation in Somalia
- Voting summary: 15 voted for; None voted against; None abstained
- Result: Adopted

Security Council composition
- Permanent members: China; France; Russia; United Kingdom; United States
- Non-permanent members: Bosnia–Herzegovina; Brazil; Colombia; Germany; Gabon; India; Lebanon; Nigeria; Portugal; South Africa

United Nations Security Council Resolution 1976 was adopted unanimously on 11 April 2011. After recalling previous resolutions on the situation in Somalia, particularly resolutions 1918 (2010) and 1950 (2010), the Council decided to consider the establishment of special Somali courts to try pirates operating off the coast of the country.

The resolution was drafted by Colombia, France, Italy, Russia, Spain and Ukraine.

== Observations ==
In the preamble of the resolution, the Security Council expressed concern over increased pirate activity and the consequences on international shipping, with acts of hostage-taking condemned. It stated that the underlying causes of piracy had to be addressed, including the building of Somalia's economy and tackling poverty. At the same time, the Council was concerned about allegations of illegal fishing and dumping of toxic waste were used by the pirates to justify criminal activities.

All countries were invited to participate in the fight against piracy; assistance was being provided by the United Nations and international organisations to strengthen the justice system in Somalia, Kenya and the Seychelles to prosecute pirates, though many were released without trial.

== Acts ==
The resolution recognised the continuing instability in Somalia as one of the underlying causes of the piracy issue. International organisations, including the United Nations Development Programme, were asked to assist the Somali authorities in establishing governance and rule of law over lawless areas where acts of piracy were taking place. Allegations of illegal fishing and the dumping of toxic waste had to be investigated and reported on.

Furthermore, the Council argued that the legal capacity of Somalia and countries in the region had to be increased in order to prosecute pirates, and thus it would consider the establishment of special courts to try pirates though did not state where such courts would be located.

== See also ==
- List of United Nations Security Council Resolutions 1901 to 2000 (2009–2011)
- Piracy in Somalia
- Somali Civil War
- United Nations Convention on the Law of the Sea
- Somali Civil War (2009–present)
