= Operation Atalanta =

European anti-piracy military operation

- EUNAVFOR ATALANTA
- Location: Gulf of Aden, Somali Basin, Red Sea, Gulf of Suez and Gulf of Aqaba
- Objective: To contribute to maritime security in the West Indian Ocean and the Red Sea, including the protection of vulnerable shipping and the deterrence, prevention and repression of piracy and armed robbery at sea
- Date: 8 December 2008 – present
- Executed by: European Union Naval Force
- Outcome: Ongoing

Operation Atalanta, formally EUNAVFOR ATALANTA, is an ongoing European Union (EU) military operation contributing to maritime security in the West Indian Ocean and the Red Sea. Launched on 8 December 2008 as the EU’s first naval operation, it was initially established to protect World Food Programme (WFP) vessels and other vulnerable shipping, and to deter, prevent and repress piracy and armed robbery off Somalia. The operation is commanded from its Operational Headquarters in Rota, Spain, and its current mandate runs until 28 February 2027.

Although counter-piracy and the protection of vulnerable shipping remain core tasks, Atalanta’s mandate has expanded considerably since its establishment. In 2022, its formal purpose was broadened from counter-piracy off Somalia to contributing to maritime security in the West Indian Ocean and the Red Sea. Its current mandate also covers the United Nations (UN) arms embargo on Al-Shabaab, narcotics trafficking, illegal, unreported and unregulated (IUU) fishing, and wider maritime situational awareness.

Academic assessments generally treat Atalanta as one element of the wider international response associated with the decline in Somali piracy rather than as an independent cause. Studies emphasise the interaction between naval operations, shipping-industry self-protection, prosecution arrangements and regional capacity-building, while also highlighting Atalanta’s role in EU counter-piracy capabilities and international naval coordination. Following renewed Somali piracy activity from late 2023, the operation has continued to respond to hijackings and attempted attacks in the region.

== Mandate and tasks ==
Operation Atalanta’s current mandate runs until 28 February 2027. Its area of operations includes the Gulf of Aden, Somali Basin, Red Sea, Gulf of Suez and Gulf of Aqaba.

Its core executive tasks are to protect WFP vessels and other vulnerable shipping, and to deter, prevent and repress piracy and armed robbery at sea. As secondary executive tasks, the operation contributes to the implementation of the UN arms embargo on Al-Shabaab and to countering narcotics trafficking off the coast of Somalia.

Atalanta also carries out a range of secondary non-executive and other supporting maritime security tasks. These include monitoring arms and narcotics trafficking and IUU fishing off Somalia. It contributes to maritime situational awareness by collecting information on arms trafficking and shadow fleets and, since March 2026, by collecting and sharing information on suspicious activities related to critical submarine infrastructure. The operation also monitors fishing activities more broadly and may support the EU’s wider engagement in Somalia, including activities addressing the root causes and networks of piracy.

Operation Atalanta forms part of the EU’s integrated approach to Somalia and the Horn of Africa. It coordinates closely with EUNAVFOR Aspides, the European Union Training Mission Somalia (EUTM Somalia) and the European Union Capacity Building Mission in Somalia (EUCAP Somalia), as well as other maritime security actors including the Combined Maritime Forces, Operation Prosperity Guardian, Operation AGENOR/European Maritime Awareness in the Strait of Hormuz and willing states operating in the region. The operation also supports regional information sharing and maritime security initiatives and maintains links with the commercial shipping industry through the Maritime Security Centre – Indian Ocean.

== Background and establishment ==
The international legal framework for counter-piracy action off Somalia developed during 2008. The United Nations Security Council (UNSC) recorded that Somalia’s Transitional Federal Government (TFG) had indicated that it welcomed international assistance against piracy and had consented to assistance in securing the waters off Somalia for safe shipping and navigation. On 2 June 2008, the UNSC adopted Resolution 1816, which authorised, for an initial period of six months, states cooperating with the TFG to enter Somali territorial waters and use all necessary means to repress piracy and armed robbery at sea, following advance notification by the TFG to the UN Secretary-General. The resolution specified that these authorisations applied only to the situation in Somalia and did not establish customary international law.

The EU initially responded by establishing EU NAVCO, a military coordination action adopted in September 2008 to support EU member states deploying military assets in implementation of Resolution 1816. In October, UNSC Resolution 1838 called on states with the necessary capacity to deploy naval vessels and military aircraft to combat piracy off Somalia and welcomed ongoing planning for a possible EU naval operation. On 10 November, the Council of the EU adopted Joint Action 2008/851/CFSP establishing EU NAVFOR Somalia – Operation Atalanta, with tasks including protection of WFP vessels and other vulnerable shipping and the deterrence, prevention and repression of piracy and armed robbery. Resolution 1846 subsequently renewed the UNSC’s authorisation for counter-piracy action in Somali territorial waters for twelve months and welcomed the EU’s decision to launch the naval operation. Operation Atalanta was formally launched on 8 December 2008.

The operation takes its name from Atalanta, the huntress of Greek mythology.

== Mandate evolution ==
The mandate began to expand during the operation’s early years. In December 2009, monitoring of fishing activities off Somalia was formally added. In March 2012, the area of operations was extended to include Somali coastal territory and internal waters, alongside maritime areas off Somalia and neighbouring countries in the Indian Ocean.

Further changes gradually connected the operation to a wider range of maritime security activities. In December 2018, Atalanta was authorised to transfer information gathered on illegal activities other than piracy to Interpol and Europol, although the Council Decision explicitly left the operation’s mandate unchanged. A more substantial expansion followed in December 2020. Alongside its existing counter-piracy tasks, Atalanta was assigned secondary executive tasks related to the UN’s arms embargo on Somalia and narcotics trafficking. Secondary non-executive tasks were also introduced for monitoring narcotics and arms trafficking, IUU fishing and illicit charcoal trade. The operation was additionally authorised to support the EU’s integrated approach to Somalia and regional maritime security cooperation.

In December 2022, the Council formally broadened the operation’s stated purpose. The title of the founding Joint Action was changed from an operation focused on the deterrence, prevention and repression of piracy and armed robbery off Somalia to a military operation contributing to maritime security in the West Indian Ocean and the Red Sea, and the operation was renamed EUNAVFOR ATALANTA. Its mandate was extended until the end of 2024, while closer coordination with EUTM Somalia, EUCAP Somalia, the EU’s Coordinated Maritime Presences in the North-West Indian Ocean and Operation AGENOR was incorporated into the mandate. In April 2024, the mandate was further adjusted following changes to the relevant UNSC authorisations, including by refocusing the arms-embargo task on Al-Shabaab and establishing closer coordination with EUNAVFOR Aspides in response to the Red Sea crisis. In December 2024, the operation was extended until 28 February 2027 and the Maritime Security Centre – Horn of Africa was renamed the Maritime Security Centre – Indian Ocean.

More recent amendments have expanded Atalanta’s maritime situational-awareness functions. In July 2025, the operation was tasked with collecting information on arms trafficking and shadow fleets for possible sharing with EU member states and relevant international organisations. In March 2026, the Council discontinued the non-executive task of monitoring illicit charcoal trade and added a task to collect and share information on suspicious activities related to critical submarine infrastructure.

== Operational history ==
During its early years, Operation Atalanta conducted frequent interdiction operations against pirate groups in the Gulf of Aden and Indian Ocean. Between 5 and 7 March 2010, Atalanta forces intercepted six pirate action groups and took more than 40 suspected pirates into custody. In May 2012, EU naval forces carried out Atalanta’s first operation against pirate targets on the Somali mainland near Harardhere, destroying several boats; no casualties were reported.

In April 2019, Atalanta responded to a series of piracy incidents involving a hijacked Yemeni fishing dhow that was being used as a mothership. The Spanish frigate Navarra, supported by maritime patrol aircraft, intercepted the dhow on 23 April. Five suspected pirates were apprehended and 23 hostages aboard the vessel were released unharmed.

Somali piracy activity increased again in late 2023 and 2024 after several years at much lower levels. In March 2024, an Atalanta vessel shadowed the Bangladesh-flagged cargo ship MV Abdullah after it was hijacked with 23 crew members on board. The vessel and crew were released after 32 days. In May, Atalanta responded to the boarding of the Liberian-flagged Basilisk around 380 nautical miles east of Mogadishu. EU forces boarded the vessel by helicopter and secured its 17 crew members, one of whom had been injured during the attack.

Atalanta continued to respond to renewed piracy incidents in 2025 and 2026. In November 2025, pirates boarded the Malta-flagged tanker Hellas Aphrodite more than 1,000 kilometres off Somalia. After a show of force by the Spanish frigate Victoria, the pirates left the tanker and Atalanta special forces boarded the vessel, where all 24 crew members had taken refuge in its citadel. In April 2026, Atalanta and supporting international naval and air assets pressured pirates to abandon the hijacked Iranian-flagged fishing vessel Alwaseemi. Combined Task Force 151 coordinated support from Japanese and South Korean assets during the operation.

== Forces and resources ==
Operation Atalanta’s force composition varies according to national contributions. The operation generally comprises approximately 600 personnel, between one and three surface combat vessels and one Maritime Patrol and Reconnaissance Aircraft (MPRA). Other assets may include unmanned aerial systems and autonomous vessel protection detachments. Contributing states bear the associated running and personnel costs of the assets and personnel they provide.

Participation in Atalanta has extended beyond EU member states. Norway became the first non-EU country to contribute a warship to the operation in 2009. Montenegro, Serbia, Ukraine and South Korea have also provided staff officers, while Ukraine contributed a warship in 2014 and New Zealand deployed an MPRA later the same year. The naval force is organised as Task Force 465 and operates through rotating force headquarters and national contributions. As of July 2026, the Spanish frigate Numancia served as the operation’s flagship.

The common costs of the operation are financed separately from the nationally borne costs of contributed forces. The financial reference amount for Atalanta’s common costs for the period from 1 January 2025 to 28 February 2027 is €13.8 million.

== Assessments of the operation ==
Academic assessments of Operation Atalanta generally place it within the wider international counter-piracy response rather than treating it as an independent cause of the decline in Somali piracy. Bueger describes Atalanta as one of the three principal multinational naval operations and as a leading participant in efforts to interrupt piracy. Jakobsen and Henningsen similarly assess the broader counter-piracy intervention as a success produced through the interaction of naval operations, ship self-protection, prosecution arrangements and regional capacity-building. Shortland’s retrospective review also cautions against attributing the decline to naval force alone, arguing that naval operations had not been effective without private security and other industry measures.

Bueger also highlights Atalanta’s role in naval coordination and maritime situational awareness, including its participation in the Shared Awareness and Deconfliction mechanism and the Internationally Recommended Transit Corridor, the establishment of the Maritime Security Centre – Horn of Africa, and the EU’s development of the MERCURY communication platform. Jakobsen and Henningsen also identify Atalanta’s May 2012 strike against pirate equipment on the Somali coast as a possible contribution to deterrence by signalling a willingness to escalate the use of force. They stress, however, that military adaptation worked alongside increasing compliance with Best Management Practices and the use of armed guards by commercial shipping.

Assessments differ more over the limits and durability of this success. Winn and Lewis link the decline in Somali piracy to increased military response capacity and greater security precautions by shipping companies, but argue that these measures did not dismantle the piracy networks and therefore constituted a temporary and costly response rather than a long-term solution. An earlier assessment by Bueger, Stockbruegger and Werthes similarly argued that naval surveillance and deterrence could contain piracy in the short term but were unlikely to provide a sustainable solution if the conditions enabling piracy on land remained unaddressed. Shortland and Percy found that increased naval resources and improved private-sector practices in the Gulf of Aden also contributed to the displacement of pirate activity into the wider Indian Ocean. By contrast, Jakobsen and Henningsen argue that eliminating the criminal networks was not necessary to the intervention’s more limited objective of stopping acts of piracy, and regard the resulting suppression as a sustainable outcome despite the survival of other criminal activities.

Beyond direct interdiction, Bueger argues that Atalanta helped move the EU from the periphery to the centre of the international counter-piracy field, with Atalanta providing a major naval and maritime situational-awareness component alongside other EU activities in capacity building and governance. Gebhard and Smith find that Atalanta and NATO’s Operation Ocean Shield operated without a formal link, joint planning or official task-sharing, but that personnel developed informal mechanisms of coordination and information exchange at the operational and tactical levels. They conclude that this coordination worked comparatively well despite political obstacles to formal EU–NATO cooperation.

== See also ==
- List of military and civilian missions of the European Union
- Maritime Security Patrol Area
- List of ships attacked by Somali pirates
- Anti-piracy measures in Somalia
- Contact Group on Piracy off the Coast of Somalia
