= Shared Awareness and Deconfliction =

Shared Awareness and De-confliction (SHADE) is an international counter piracy meeting, convened in Bahrain. It aimed to encourage sharing information, assessing the evolution of trends, best practices and to de-conflict operations amongst counter-piracy actors in the Gulf of Aden, the Gulf of Oman and the Western Indian Ocean.

The first meeting was held in Bahrain in December 2008. It was attended by a variety of states and organizations involved in counter-piracy operations, such as the Combined Maritime Forces (CMF) and EU NAVFOR Somalia.

Since 2017 SHADE meets twice a year in Bahrain, chaired alternatively by CMF and EU NAVFOR Somalia. The international shipping industry is a key stakeholder in SHADE meetings. International organizations active in the maritime domain in the region such as WFP and UNODC also attend the SHADE meetings.

In 2017 a similar platform, SHADE MED, was established in relation to maritime security operations working to prevent illegal immigration in the Mediterranean sea.

On 3 and 4 November 2020, CMF and EU NAVFOR Somalia co-hosted the 47th Shared Awareness and De-confliction (SHADE) Conference. It was the first occasion in 11 years, that this event was convened virtually, as a result of the restrictions imposed by the COVID-19 pandemic.
