= United Nations Security Council Resolution 1897 =

UN Security Council Resolution 1897
- UN emblem
- Date: 30 November 2009
- Meeting no.: 6,226
- Code: S/RES/1897 (Document)
- Subject: The situation in Somalia
- Voting summary: 15 voted for; None voted against; None abstained
- Result: Adopted

Security Council composition
- Permanent members: China; France; Russia; United Kingdom; United States
- Non-permanent members: Austria; Burkina Faso; Costa Rica; Croatia; Japan; Libya; Mexico; Turkey; Uganda; Vietnam

United Nations Security Council Resolution 1897 was unanimously adopted on 30 November 2009.

== Resolution ==
The Security Council today decided to renew, for a period of 12 months, its previous authorizations for States and regional organizations cooperating with the Somali Transitional Federal Government (TFG) to enter Somalia’s territorial waters and use all necessary means to fight piracy and armed robbery at sea off the Somali coast, provided advance notification was given by the TFG to the Secretary-General.

Adopting resolution 1897 (2009) unanimously and acting under Chapter VII of the United Nations Charter, the Council also invited all States and regional organizations engaged in this fight to conclude special agreements or arrangements with countries willing to take custody of pirates. Those arrangements should allow for the embarkation of law enforcement officials—or “shipriders”—from these willing countries to facilitate the investigation and prosecution of persons detained as a result of anti-piracy operations, provided that the advance consent of the TFG was obtained for third State jurisdiction in Somali territorial waters and that such arrangements did not prejudice the effective implementation of the 1988 Convention for the Suppression of Unlawful Acts against the Safety of Maritime Navigation.

The resolution affirms that the renewed authorizations apply only to the situation in Somalia and shall not affect the States' rights or obligations or responsibilities with respect to any other situation. It particularly underscores that it shall not be considered as establishing customary international law and affirms that its authorizations have been renewed only following the receipt of letters dated 2 and 6 November 2009, which conveyed the TFG's consent.

Among the text's other provisions, the Council called on States to assist Somalia in strengthening its capacity to bring to justice those using Somali territory to plan, facilitate or undertake criminal acts of piracy and armed robbery, consistent with applicable international human rights law. All States—particularly flag, port and coastal States, as well as those of both the victims and perpetrators of piracy and armed robbery—were called on to cooperate in order to ensure that all pirates handed over to judicial authorities were subject to a judicial process.

Welcoming the revisions by the International Maritime Organization (IMO) of its recommendations and guidance on preventing and suppressing piracy and armed robbery, the Council further urged States, in collaboration with the IMO and the shipping and insurance industries, to continue to develop and implement avoidance, evasion, and defensive best practices and advisories to take when under attack or when sailing in the waters off the Somali coast.

== See also ==
- List of United Nations Security Council Resolutions 1801 to 1900 (2008–2009)
