= United Nations Security Council Resolution 1814 =

UN Security Council Resolution 1814
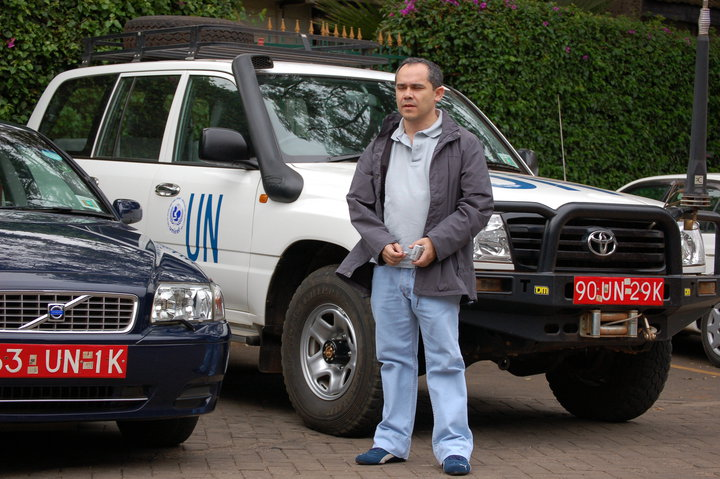
- UN vehicle
- Date: 15 May 2008
- Meeting no.: 5,893
- Code: S/RES/1853 (Document)
- Subject: The situation in Somalia
- Voting summary: 15 voted for; None voted against; None abstained
- Result: Adopted

Security Council composition
- Permanent members: China; France; Russia; United Kingdom; United States
- Non-permanent members: Burkina Faso; Belgium; Costa Rica; Croatia; Indonesia; Italy; Libya; Panama; South Africa; Vietnam

United Nations Security Council Resolution 1814 was unanimously adopted on 15 May 2008. The resolution called for the United Nations to provide economic, political and technical support to Somalia, with a possible UN peacekeeping force.

== Resolution ==
"The UN Security Council this afternoon expressed its strong support for Secretary-General Ban Ki-moon’s integrated strategy for building the foundations of peace and durable stability in Somalia, including plans for greater international presence on the ground in the troubled east African country.

Unanimously adopting resolution 1814 (2008) under Chapter VII of the United Nations Charter, the 15-member body endorsed the three-pronged approach proposed in Mr. Ban’s 14 March report on the situation (document S/2008/178), which aligned the political, security and programmatic efforts of the United Nations in the country in a “sequenced and mutually reinforcing way”, and requested an updated version within 60 days.

To facilitate that strategy, the Council approved Mr. Ban’s proposal to establish a joint planning unit in the office of his Special Representative, and welcomed his recommendation to relocate the United Nations Political Office for Somalia (UNPOS) and the country team headquarters from Nairobi, Kenya, to Mogadishu, the seat of the Transitional Federal Institutions in Somalia.

It decided that UNPOS and the country team should support the Transitional Federal Institutions in developing a Constitution and holding a referendum on the resulting document, as well as holding democratic elections in 2009.

In regard to security, it welcomed efforts, in coordination with donors, to strengthen United Nations logistical, political and technical support to the African Union in order to help that organization reinforce its Mission in Somalia, known as AMISOM. It also requested that the Secretary-General continue his contingency planning for the possible deployment of a United Nations peacekeeping mission to succeed AMISOM, including mandate options in addition to those already proposed in his report.

Recalling its intention to take action against people or organizations that hampered stability in Somalia or breached the arms embargo, it requested the sanctions committee for the country to recommend, within 60 days, specific, targeted measures to impose on them".

== See also ==
- List of United Nations Security Council Resolutions 1801 to 1900 (2008–2009)
