= United Nations Security Council Resolution 1838 =

UN Security Council Resolution 1838
- UN Security Council Resolution 1838
- Date: 7 October 2008
- Meeting no.: 5,987
- Code: S/RES/1838 (Document)
- Subject: The situation in Somalia
- Voting summary: 15 voted for; None voted against; None abstained
- Result: Adopted

Security Council composition
- Permanent members: China; France; Russia; United Kingdom; United States
- Non-permanent members: Burkina Faso; Belgium; Costa Rica; Croatia; Indonesia; Italy; Libya; Panama; South Africa; Vietnam

United Nations Security Council Resolution 1838 is a United Nations Security Council resolution that calls on nations with vessels in the Somali piracy region to apply military force as a means of repressing acts of piracy. Adopted unanimously on October 7, 2008, it recommends that states commit both naval and air forces to fight this crime. The text was drafted by French authorities.
