= Contact Group on Piracy off the Coast of Somalia =

International governance mechanism

The Contact Group on Piracy off the Coast of Somalia, commonly abbreviated as CGPCS, is an ad-hoc formed international governance mechanism (International Contact Group) established in New York on January 14, 2009, to facilitate the discussion and coordination of actions among states and organizations to suppress Somali piracy.

The CGPCS was established in response to United Nations Security Council Resolution 1851 (2008), later recalled and replaced with United Nations Security Council Resolution 1918 (2010). To date, more than 60 countries and international organizations have become part of this forum, all of which are working towards the prevention of piracy off the Somali coast.

== Working Procedures ==
The CGPCS meets in two formats a bi-annual plenary and working groups as well as several ad-hoc sub-groups. The CGPCS does not have a standing secretariat. Chairpersonship of the plenary and the working groups is rotating. Outcome of the Plenary are so-called communiques.

== Working Groups ==
Until a reform process was initiated in 2014 the CGPCS had five working groups:

- WG 1 - Naval Cooperation - "ensuring effective naval operational co-ordination and supporting the building of the judicial, penal and maritime capacity of Regional States to ensure they are better equipped to tackle piracy and maritime security challenges" (Chair: United Kingdom.)
- WG 2 - Legal Issues - "provides specific, practical and legally sound guidance to the CGPCS, States and organizations on all legal aspects of counter-piracy" (Chair: Denmark.)
- WG 3 - Self-Defensive Actions - "discusses concerns of the participant states, maritime industry and labor groups regarding the actions that should be used to provide self-defensive actions to protect vessels from hijacking by pirates in the high risk waters off Somalia" (Chair: Republic of Korea.)
- WG 4 - Public Diplomacy - "focuses mainly on the public diplomacy aspect of the problem of combating piracy over the coast of Somalia. It aims at raising awareness of the dangers of piracy and highlighting the best practices to eradicate this criminal phenomenon" (Chair: Egypt.)
- WG 5 - Flow of Illegal Funds - "coordinates international efforts to identify and disrupt the financial networks of pirate leaders and their financiers" (Chair: Italy.)

Following the 2014 Reform process the Contact Group has three working groups. The first working group focuses on capacity building coordination and continues the work of the former WG1 and its sub-group (the Capacity Building Coordination Group) in this area. The second working group focuses on operations at sea and continues elements of the work of the former WG1 and WG3. The third working Group is the former WG5 and continues the work in the area of tracing the financial networks of piracy and working towards the prosecution of piracy king pins. The work of WG2 and WG4 was discontinued. WG2 was replaced by a virtual Piracy Legal Forum .

== Lessons Learned ==
In 2014 the CGPCS initiated a lessons learned project. The starting point for the project was that the CGPCS represents a unique as well as very successful type of governance mechanism and that this experience requires to be recorded. A Lessons Learned Consortium was formed comprising the NGO Oceans Beyond Piracy , the European Union Institute of Security Studies, and the Counter-Piracy Governance Project at Cardiff University . The results of the project are published on a dedicated website , which also serves as the official website and repository of the CGPCS.

== Accomplishments ==
The US Department of State recently quoted the accomplishments of the Group as :

- Facilitated the operational coordination of an unprecedented international naval effort from more than 30 countries working together to protect transiting vessels.
- Partnered with the shipping industry to improve and promote Best Management Practices that merchant ships and crews can take to avoid, deter, delay, and counter pirate attacks.
- Strengthened the capacity of Somalia and other countries in the region to combat piracy, in particular by contributing to the UN Trust Fund Supporting Initiatives of States Countering Piracy off the Coast of Somalia; and
- Launched a new initiative aimed at disrupting the pirate enterprise ashore, including its associated financial networks, through approaches similar to those used to address other types of organized transnational crime networks.
