= United Nations Security Council Resolution 1846 =

2008 resolution relating to piracy off the coast of Somalia

UN Security Council Resolution 1846
- Date: 2 December 2008
- Meeting no.: 6,026
- Code: S/RES/1846 (Document)
- Subject: The situation in Somalia
- Voting summary: 15 voted for; None voted against; None abstained
- Result: Adopted

Security Council composition
- Permanent members: China; France; Russia; United Kingdom; United States
- Non-permanent members: Burkina Faso; Belgium; Costa Rica; Croatia; Indonesia; Italy; Libya; Panama; South Africa; Vietnam

United Nations Security Council Resolution 1846 was unanimously adopted on 2 December 2008.

== Resolution ==
The Security Council today strengthened international efforts to fight piracy off the coast of Somalia, by expanding the mandate of States and regional organizations working with Somali officials towards that aim.

Through the unanimous adoption of resolution 1846 (2008), and acting under the Charter’s Chapter VII, the Council decided that during the next 12 months States and regional organizations cooperating with the Somali Transitional Federal Government (TFG) may enter Somalia’s territorial waters and use “all necessary means” – such as deploying naval vessels and military aircraft, as well as seizing and disposing of boats, vessels, arms and related equipment used for piracy – to fight piracy and armed robbery at sea off the Somali coast, in accordance with relevant international law. States and regional organizations cooperating with Somali authorities were also requested to provide the Council and the Secretary-General with a progress report on their actions within nine months.

Further to that text, the council expressed its concern over the findings of a 20 November report of the Monitoring Group on Somalia that escalating ransom payments were fueling a growth in piracy off the Somali coast. It called upon States, the International Maritime Organization (IMO), and the shipping and insurance industries to appropriately advise and guide ships on how to avoid, evade and defend themselves against attack, as well as provide Somalia and nearby coastal States with technical assistance to ensure coastal and maritime security.

The text affirms that the authorizations apply only with respect to the situation in Somalia. It underscores, in particular, that the resolution shall not be considered as establishing customary international law and, further, that the authorizations have been provided only following the receipt of a 20 November letter conveying the consent of the TFG.

The resolution also welcomes initiatives by Canada, Denmark, France, India, Netherlands, Russian Federation, Spain, United Kingdom and the United States, and by regional and international organizations, to counter piracy off the Somalia coast pursuant to resolutions 1814 (2008), 1816 (2008) and 1838 (2008), as well as the decision by the European Union to launch for a period of 12 months from December 2008 a naval operation to protect World Food Programme (WFP) maritime convoys bringing humanitarian assistance to Somalia, and other vulnerable ships.

== See also ==
- List of United Nations Security Council Resolutions 1801 to 1900 (2008–2009)
