= United Nations Security Council Resolution 1816 =

UN Security Council Resolution 1816
- Date: 2 June 2008
- Meeting no.: 5,902
- Code: S/RES/1816 (Document)
- Subject: The situation in Somalia
- Voting summary: 15 voted for; None voted against; None abstained
- Result: Adopted

Security Council composition
- Permanent members: China; France; Russia; United Kingdom; United States
- Non-permanent members: Burkina Faso; Belgium; Costa Rica; Croatia; Indonesia; Italy; Libya; Panama; South Africa; Vietnam

United Nations Security Council Resolution 1816 was unanimously adopted on 2 June 2008.

== Resolution ==
Condemning all acts of piracy and armed robbery against vessels off the coast of Somalia, the Security Council this afternoon authorized a series of decisive measures to combat those crimes.

By the terms of resolution 1816 (2008), which was unanimously adopted today, the Council decided that the States cooperating with the country's transitional Government would be allowed, for a period of six months, to enter the territorial waters of Somalia and use “all necessary means” to repress acts of piracy and armed robbery at sea, in a manner consistent with relevant provisions of international law.

The text was adopted with consent of Somalia, which lacks the capacity to interdict pirates or patrol and secure its territorial waters, following a surge in attacks on ships in the waters off the country's coast, including hijackings of vessels operated by the World Food Programme and numerous commercial vessels – all of which posed a threat “to the prompt, safe and effective delivery of food aid and other humanitarian assistance to the people of Somalia”, and a grave danger to vessels, crews, passengers and cargo.

Affirming that the authorization provided in the resolution applies only to the situation in Somalia and shall not affect the rights and obligations under the Law of the Sea Convention, nor be considered as establishing customary international law, the council also requested cooperating States to ensure that anti-piracy actions they undertake do not deny or impair the right of innocent passage to the ships of any third State.

While urging States, whose naval vessels and military aircraft operate on the high seas and airspace of the coast of Somalia to be vigilant, the Council encouraged States interested in the use of commercial routes off the coast of Somalia to increase and coordinate their efforts to deter attacks upon and hijacking of vessels, in cooperation with the country's Government. All States were urged to cooperate with each other, the International Maritime Organization (IMO) and, as appropriate, regional organizations and render assistance to vessels threatened by or under attack by pirates.

Speaking prior to action on the draft, Indonesia's representative emphasized the need for the draft to be consistent with international law, particularly the 1982 United Nations Convention on the Law of the Sea, and to avoid creating a basis for customary international law for the repression of piracy and armed robbery at sea. Actions envisaged in the resolution should only apply to the territorial waters of Somalia, based upon that country's prior consent. The resolution addressed solely the specific situation off the coast of Somalia, as requested by the Government.

== See also ==
- List of United Nations Security Council Resolutions 1801 to 1900 (2008–2009)
