= United Nations Security Council Resolution 1851 =

UN Security Council Resolution 1851
- Date: 16 December 2008
- Meeting no.: 6,046
- Code: S/RES/1851 (Document)
- Subject: The situation in Somalia
- Voting summary: 15 voted for; None voted against; None abstained
- Result: Adopted

Security Council composition
- Permanent members: China; France; Russia; United Kingdom; United States
- Non-permanent members: Burkina Faso; Belgium; Costa Rica; Croatia; Indonesia; Italy; Libya; Panama; South Africa; Vietnam

United Nations Security Council Resolution 1851 was unanimously adopted on 16 December 2008.

== Resolution ==
The Security Council decided that, for the next year, States and regional organizations cooperating in the fight against piracy and armed robbery at sea off Somalia's coast—for which prior notification had been provided by Somalia’s Transitional Federal Government to the Secretary-General – could undertake all necessary measures “appropriate in Somalia”, to interdict those using Somali territory to plan, facilitate or undertake such acts.

Acting under Chapter VII through the unanimous adoption of United States-led resolution 1851 (2008), the Council called on those States and organizations able to do so to actively participate in defeating piracy and armed robbery off Somalia's coast by deploying naval vessels and military aircraft, and through seizure and disposition of boats and arms used in the commission of those crimes, following on a 9 December 2008 letter from the Transitional Federal Government for international assistance to counter the surge in piracy and armed robbery there.

The Council invited all such States and regional organizations to conclude special agreements or arrangements with countries willing to take custody of pirates in order to embark law enforcement officials, known as “shipriders”, from the latter countries to facilitate the investigation and prosecution of persons detained as a result of operations conducted under this resolution.

The resolution's passage led to the creation of the Contact Group on Piracy off the Coast of Somalia (CGPCS).

== See also ==
- List of United Nations Security Council Resolutions 1801 to 1900 (2008–2009)
