= Piracy in the Strait of Malacca =

Piracy in the China Sea

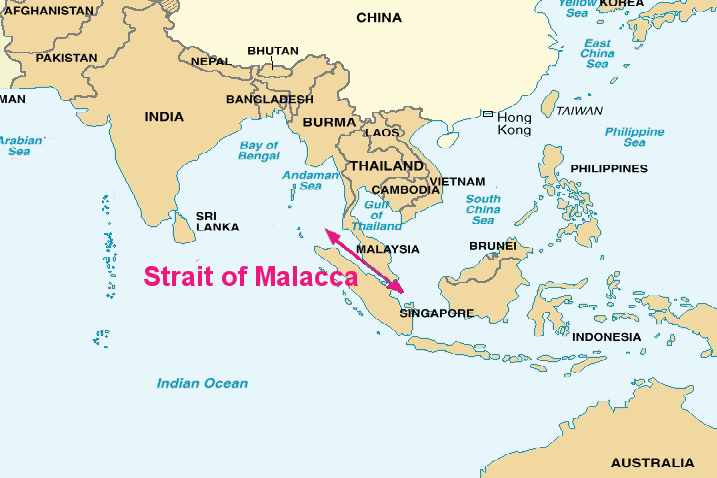
Strait of Malacca

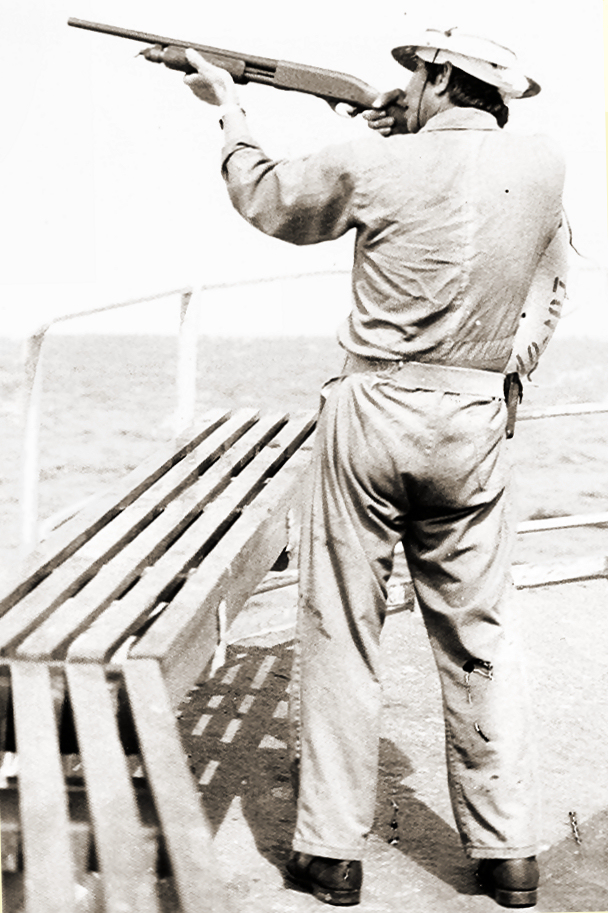
A US merchant seaman takes aim during training to repel pirates in the Strait of Malacca, 1984.

Piracy in the Strait of Malacca has long been a threat to ship owners and the mariners who ply the 900 km-long (550 miles) sea lane. In recent years, coordinated patrols by Indonesia, Malaysia, Thailand, and Singapore along with increased security on vessels have caused a sharp downturn in piracy.

The Strait of Malacca's geography makes the region very susceptible to piracy. It is an important passageway between China and India, and used heavily for commercial trade, with 60% of international maritime trade passing through annually. The strait is on the route between Europe, the Suez Canal, the oil-exporting countries of the Persian Gulf, and the busy ports of East Asia. It is narrow, contains thousands of islets, and is an outlet for many rivers, making it ideal for pirates to evade capture.

== History ==
Piracy in the Strait of Malacca was not only a lucrative way of life but also an important political tool. Rulers relied on the region's pirates to maintain control. For example, it was through the loyalty of Orang Laut pirate crews that the 14th-century Palembang prince Parameswara survived expansion attempts by neighbouring rulers and eventually went on to found the Sultanate of Malacca.

Piracy in the region was mentioned in Chinese texts; for example, the 14th century traveller Wang Dayuan described pirates from Long Ya Men (in present-day Singapore) and Lambri (in Northern Sumatra) in his work Daoyi Zhilüe. The pirates of Long Ya Men were said to leave Chinese junks going west through the strait undisturbed, but waited until the Chinese junks were on their way back to China laden with goods before they attacked with two to three hundred boats.

Between the 15th and 19th centuries, Malaysian waters played a key role in political power struggles throughout Southeast Asia. Aside from local powers, antagonists also included such colonial powers as the Portuguese, Dutch and British. A record of foreign presence, particularly in the South China Sea and the Strait of Malacca, is found today in the watery graves of sailing vessels lost to storms, piracy, battles, and poor ship handling.

In the 1830s, the controlling colonial powers in the region, the British East India Company and the Dutch Empire, agreed to curb the rampant piracy. This decision, embodied in the Anglo-Dutch Treaty of 1824 led to the creation of the British Straits Settlements of Malacca, Dinding, Penang, and Singapore, seats of British administration aimed at controlling piracy and enabling maritime trade. The British and Dutch empires effectively drew a demarcation line along the strait, agreeing to fight against piracy on their own side of the line. This line of demarcation would eventually become the modern-day border between Malaysia and Indonesia. Increased patrolling and superior seafaring technology on the part of the European powers, as well as improved political stability and economic conditions in the region, eventually allowed the European powers to greatly curb piracy in the region by the 1870s.

Following the 1869 opening of the Suez Canal and changing shipping routes, the British and Dutch signed the Anglo-Dutch Treaties of 1870–1871 which ended British territorial claims to Sumatra, allowing the Dutch a free hand within their sphere of influence in Maritime Southeast Asia while handing them the responsibility to check piracy. The treaty eventually led to the Aceh War.

== Modern piracy ==
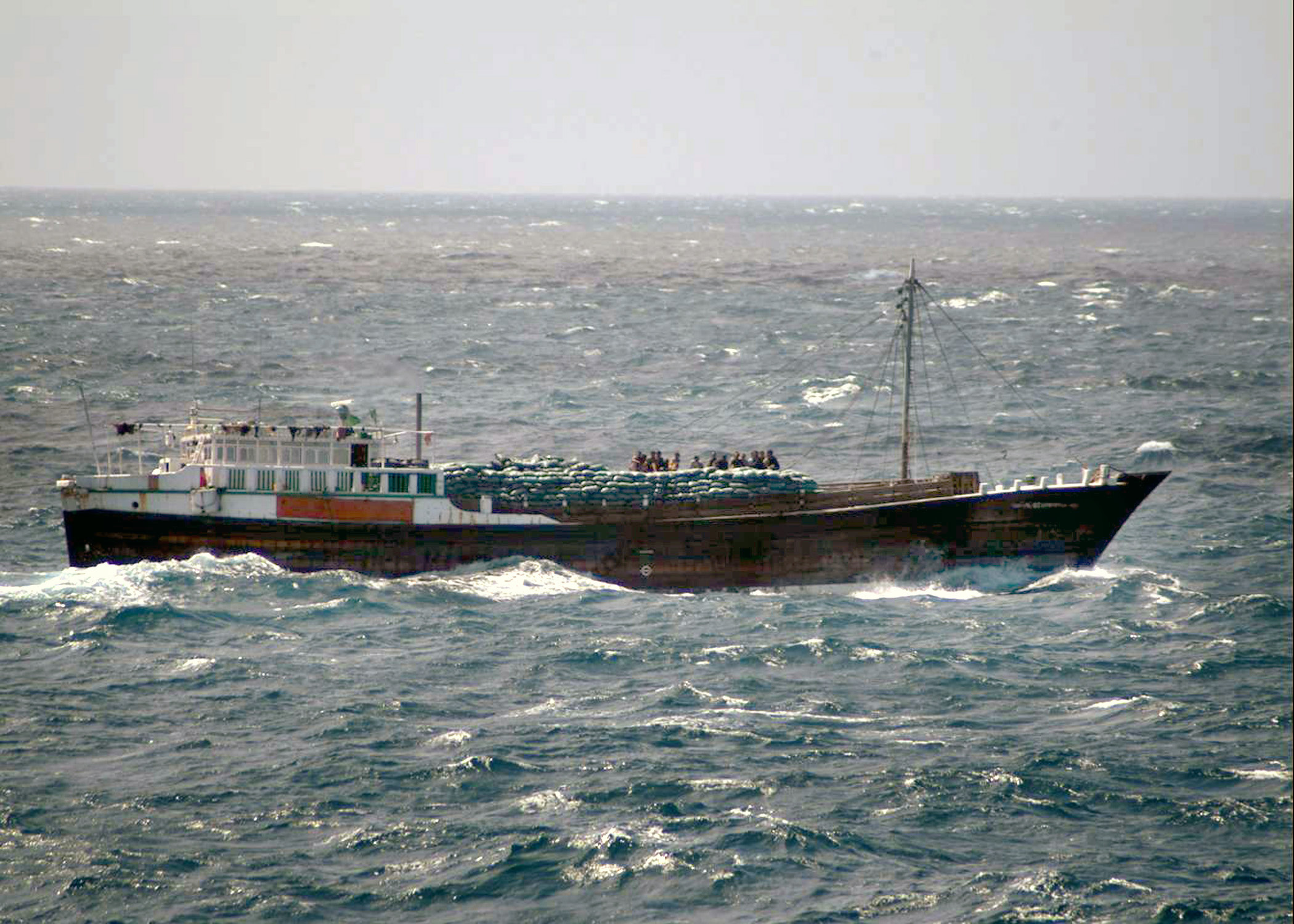
Suspected pirates assemble on the deck of a dhow in waters off western Malaysia, January 2006.

The International Maritime Bureau (IMB) reports worldwide pirate attacks fell for the third year in a row in 2006. Attacks on ships at sea in 2006 fell to 239 vessels, down from 276 in 2005. That same trend echoed in the Strait of Malacca where attacks dropped from 79 in 2005 to 50 in 2006. Nonetheless, in 2004, the region accounted for 40% of piracy worldwide. The IMB reported in October 2007 that Indonesia continued to be the world's most pirate-struck region with 37 attacks since January 2007, though that was an improvement from the same nine-month period in 2006.

The September 11 attacks also heightened the perceived threat of terrorism-related piracy, but US Maritime Administration (MARAD) experts distinguish terrorism from piracy, and piracy from shore gangs who rob ships in port. Some observers argue that there is no single problem of violence at sea, but rather a collection of problems, and that different kinds of violence require different defences.

Technology is being used to combat pirates, in addition to air and sea patrols. For instance, the IMB's 2006 annual report notes that since July 2004 vessels of 500 gross tons or more must have security alert systems on board. Security systems include near-real-time ship location devices. Furthermore, the Federation of ASEAN Shipowners' Associations has launched a database system to provide updated information on location, types of attacks, and outcomes. The system, called the "Information Sharing Centre (ISC)", is part of a 14-nation pact to combat pirates. According to the Singapore Transport Ministry's Permanent Secretary, "Piracy is a transnational problem and this is the first time an international body has been set up to deal solely with the problem of piracy in Asia."

Violent, armed pirates robbing crews at sea create attention-getting headlines, but the direct economic impact of robbery at sea is small relative to the volume of global trade in the area. Typical pirate booty is limited to ship's stores, engine parts, and crew members' cash and personal property. Piracy also has indirect costs, including increased security measures and spikes in shipping insurance premiums.

For instance, Lloyd's of London declared the strait a high war-risk area for insurance purposes, underscoring the Strait of Malacca's outlaw reputation in recent years. The action added a premium of 1% of cargo value, "infuriating shipping lines", according to news reports. The declaration of the sea lane as a high war-risk area referenced the waterway's "war, strikes, terrorism, and related perils". Company officials, however, lifted the advisory in 2006, after Singapore and Indonesia launched their sea and air patrols.

Pirate attacks have not stopped the 50,000 ships that annually transit the narrow passage. Forty percent of the world's trade passes through it and it has become the most important route of transport for oil from the Middle East to markets in East Asia.

According to the IMB, the majority of modern pirates in the region are of Indonesian origin. Of the countries in the region, Indonesia's navy is least equipped to combat piracy. Instances of modern piracy typically fall into one of three categories: those looking for easy profit, those working with or belonging to organised crime syndicates, and those associated with terrorist or secessionist groups with political motivations.

Pirates looking only for easy profit are usually criminals of opportunity. They search for easy targets, robbing ships and their crews of money and valuables. Those belonging to organised criminal syndicates attack with more sophistication and planning. Their operations, which require skill, co-ordination, and funding, aim to steal large cargoes or to kidnap ships' crews for ransom. The kind of piracy related to terrorism operates similarly, but differs in that it seeks funding to continue terrorist activities or to make political statements.

In 2014, a new piracy strategy of specifically targeting oil and diesel tankers emerged. This caused concern about the revival of piracy in the Straits of Malacca. In 2024, ReCAAP reported targeted stealing of engine spares by pirates as unique to the Singapore and Malacca Straits, indicating the possibility of a black market.

The threat of piracy in the Strait of Malacca has also contributed to China's broader security concerns, as reliance on the strait for energy imports has made it a focal point of what Chinese leaders have called the "Malacca dilemma," a strategic vulnerability tied to both piracy and the risk of foreign interdiction during conflict.

According to ReCAAP, there were 107 incidents of piracy in the Straits of Malacca in 2024, representing a 6% increase from 2023. Piracy and robbery surged in the first half of 2025, with 80 incidents as opposed to 21 in 2024.

=== Multi-national collaboration ===
In 2004, the four countries in the region, Indonesia, Thailand, Malaysia, and Singapore, increased efforts to patrol the strait in an attempt to curb piracy. While Singapore wants international support in this effort, Indonesia and Malaysia are opposed to foreign intervention. It remains to be seen whether the three countries will be able to stamp out piracy. The problem is especially acute in Indonesia. There were 325 reported pirate attacks worldwide in 2004; nine occurred in Malaysian waters, twenty in Thai waters, eight in Singaporean waters, and the highest at 93 in Indonesian waters.

With Indonesia making it clear that it is not adequately equipped to patrol the Strait, the Indian Navy and Indian Coast Guard finally agreed to join the multinational piracy patrol in the Strait of Malacca in 2006. India is also building a UAV-patrol base in the Andaman and Nicobar Islands to monitor the Andaman Sea adjacent to the Strait of Malacca.

Due to co-operation between these countries, and to some extent with Thailand, piracy in the region has almost been eradicated, with only two attempts in 2008. But according to piracy expert Catherine Zara Raymond,

There seems to be a failure, particularly outside the region, to recognise this change in the frequency of pirate attacks and the scale of the problem. While piracy has certainly been a concern in the waterway in the past, with reported attacks reaching seventy-five in 2000, the number of cases has been falling since 2005.

On 21 April 2011, the Chief of Malaysian Defence Forces Jeneral Tan Sri Dato’ Sri Azizan Ariffin said the Strait of Malacca last year achieved a "close-to-zero incident level" due to the collaboration among the countries in the Malacca Straits Patrol (MSP) — Malaysia, Singapore, Indonesia, and Thailand.

== Prominent pirates in the Strait of Malacca ==
- Chen Zuyi (15th century), whose fleet was destroyed during battle with Ming China
- Abdulla al-Hadj (19th century)

== See also ==
- Piracy in the Sulu and Celebes Seas
- Piracy in the Caribbean – Piracy in the region from the 1500s to the 1830s
  - Piracy in the British Virgin Islands – Piracy in the Caribbean
- Piracy on Falcon Lake – Part of the Mexican drug war
- Piracy in the Gulf of Guinea
- Piracy in Indonesia
- Piracy in the Singapore Strait
- Piracy in Somalia – Hijacking of ships by Somali pirates
- Pirates of the South China Coast – 18th to 19th century Chinese pirates
- Sandokan – Fictional 19th century pirate created by Italian author Emilio Salgari
- Thalassocracy – Sea-based state or society
- Wokou – 13th–17th century pirates in East Asia
