= Piracy on Falcon Lake =

Part of the Mexican drug war

- Part of the Mexican drug war
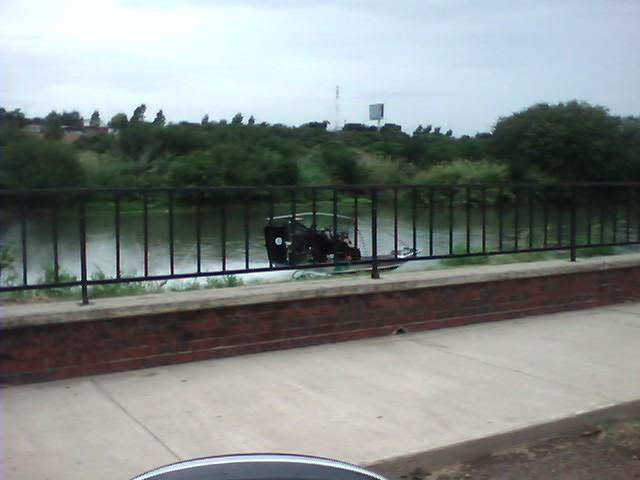
- United States Coast Guardsmen patrolling Falcon Lake, October 2010.
Date	2010 – 2011
Location	Falcon Lake, Rio Grande, Mexico, United States 26.5588°N 99.1647°W
Result	status quo

Belligerents
Mexico; United States	Los Zetas

Commanders and leaders
Unknown	Unknown

Casualties and losses
Mexico: 1 soldier killed and 1 investigator killed	12 killed
- Civilian casualties: 1 killed

Piracy on Falcon Lake refers to an increase in crime at the border between the United States and Mexico on Falcon Lake. The lake is a 60-mile (97 km) long reservoir of the Rio Grande that was constructed in 1954 and is a known drug smuggling route.

A turf war between rival drug cartels for control of the lake began in March 2010 and has led to a series of armed robberies and shooting incidents. All of the attacks were credited to the Los Zetas cartel and occurred primarily on the Mexican side of the reservoir but within sight of the Texas coast. The so-called pirates operated "fleets" of small boats designed to seize fishermen and smuggle drugs.

While the events have been referred to colloquially as piracy, all the waters of Falcon Lake are considered either US or Mexican territorial waters and therefore crime there is not technically piracy under Article 101 of the UN Convention on the Law of the Sea.

== Piracy incidents ==
=== 2010 ===
A turf war between the Los Zetas and the Gulf Cartel began in early 2010 as part of the Mexican drug war. The violence in and around Reynosa in March caused both civilians and Zeta cartel members to leave their homes and take refuge at Falcon Lake. Beginning in May 2010, the Zetas acquired several small skiffs, bass boats and Argos boats which they used to patrol their side of the lake for Gulf Cartel members, though they often commit other crimes such as the robbing of civilian vessels close to the shore.

Some reports suggest that the Zetas commandeered boats belonging to Mexican fishermen and forced their crews to commit crimes. On April 30, 2010, five Americans in two boats were fishing on Falcon Lake at the Old Guerrero church. While there, a boat with four "heavily tattooed" men boarded the boats, demanded money and drugs. Ultimately the pirates received $200 cash before the American boats made an escape. The pirates followed the fishing boats, but the Americans got away when they crossed into United States territory.

==== May ====
On May 6, 2010, three fishermen in a boat off the north side of Salado Island were approached by a boat with two men armed with AR-15s. One of the pirates boarded the boat and searched it for drugs, money or guns. During the incident, one of the pirates chambered a round and told the fishermen that he would shoot if they did not give him money. On May 16, five armed men boarded and robbed another boat also on the American side of the lake. There has been at least three other confirmed incidents in which armed men dressed in black have boarded American boats while they were fishing just inside of Mexican waters.

In late May, a Border Patrol boat chased another boat occupied by men in ski masks but the vessel was faster than the Americans and got away. Fishermen have also reported sighting small boats loaded with Mexicans and machine guns. The pirates speak Spanish and claim to be Mexican Police officers though they have been identified by tattoos of the letter "Z" for Zeta on their arms or necks. Texas Department of Public Safety officials issued a warning for American citizens to stay on the United States side of the water and to be on the lookout for vessels used by Mexican fishermen, boats with a large prow, a small outboard motor without a cowling and no identification numbers on the hull. The warning has prevented many Texas fisherman and tourists from using the lake entirely.

==== August ====
On August 31, United States authorities released a statement saying that pirates aboard a small boat tried to intercept an American fishing boat but the operator outran the attackers and returned to the Texas side of the reservoir. On the side of the pirate boat was the misspelled words "Game Wardin", written with tape. The fisherman noticed this mistake and assumed the approaching vessel to be a pirate.

==== September ====
On September 30, 2010, the most serious incident involving the pirates thus far occurred when McAllen, Texas resident and Colorado native David Hartley went missing while riding through the Mexican side of the lake on a jet ski with his wife Tiffany Hartley. According to Tiffany's report to the Texas police, men in two small boats approached and fired on her and her husband with automatic weapons in an attempt to steal their jet skis. They then chased her back to the American side of the lake. Hartley also said that her husband was shot in the head and the pirates retrieved his body and the jet ski. Mr. Hartley's body remains missing. Both the Mexican and the United States governments launched an investigation in early October. Search and rescue teams searched the lake but no evidence was found.

During the investigation, Mexican homicide detective Rolando Armando Flores Villegas of Tamaulipas was reportedly killed and his head delivered in a suitcase to the Mexican Army. The detective was one of many officers assigned to investigating the Hartley incident and he was allegedly killed only days after delivering a document to a local television station which named two of the suspected pirates. Gary Freeman, a political scientist at the University of Texas, stated that "the beheading has such strong resonance with Islamic fundamentalism that it raises the specter of groups in Mexico being as fanatical and as bloodthirsty as Osama bin Laden and his gang. They seem to be copying some of their techniques, and that might be deliberate." However, Mexican police stated they do not believe the killing to bear any relation to the Hartley case.

=== 2011 ===
On May 8, 2011, Mexican Naval Infantry patrolling the lake discovered a camp of Zetas on an island believed to be used for smuggling marijuana into the United States by speedboat. The marines fired first and a battle began that left twelve cartel members and one marine dead. Twenty small arms were captured including assault rifles.

== See also ==
- Piracy in the Strait of Malacca
- Piracy in Somalia
- Piracy in the Gulf of Guinea
- Piracy in the Caribbean
- River pirate
- Mexican drug war
