= Combined Task Force 151 =

Multinational naval task force

Combined Task Force 151 (CTF-151) is a multinational naval task force, set up in 2009 as a response to piracy attacks in the Gulf of Aden and off the eastern coast of Somalia. Its mission is to disrupt piracy and armed robbery at sea and to engage with regional and other partners to build capacity and improve relevant capabilities in order to protect global maritime commerce and secure freedom of navigation. It operates in conjunction with the EU's Operation Atalanta and NATO's Operation Ocean Shield.

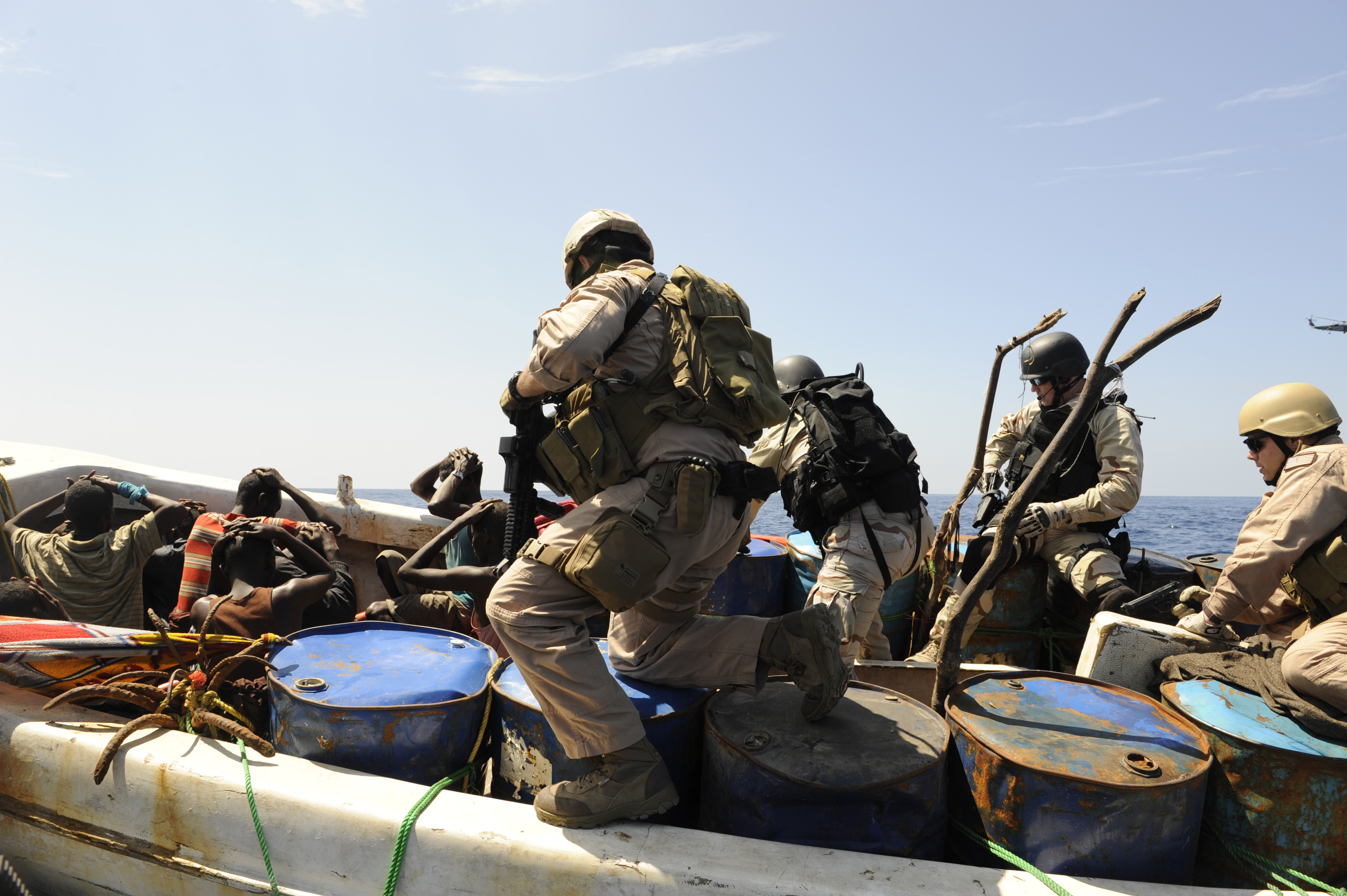
Members of the U.S. Coast Guard Law Enforcement Detachments and Combined Task Force 151's conduct VBSS operations from USS Farragut (DDG-99) board a suspicious boat

As of January 22, 2025, the commander of CTF-151 is Commodore Sohail Ahmed Azmie of the Pakistan Navy.

== History ==
The CTF 151 was established on 12 January 2009 as a response to piracy attacks in Somalia, "with a specific piracy mission-based mandate under the authority of UNSCRs 1816, 1838, 1846, 1851 and 1897". The CTF 150 mainly dealt with maritime security and counter terrorism. Piracy was considered more of a law enforcement mission. CTF were established as a mission-based Task Force. Upon their establishment in 2009, operated under a UNSCR counter-piracy mandate. The CTF is not geographically constrained. Their mandate has been "based upon the range of counter-piracy UNSCRs". In February 2011, a group of pirates hijacked a Panamanian-flagged ship. The Puntland government stated that they did not want captured ships and pirate bases near Bosaso. The pirates forced the ship's crew to the south, to a coastal area that was not as receptive. Admiral Mcknight had a conversation with Jatin Dua and the Navy SEALS rescued two hostages who were being held in an inland camp. The SEALS killed about nine pirates.

In January 2012, six Somali pirates launched an attack on the bulk cargo ship the MV Sunshine about one hundred miles off the coast of Oman. This was referred to as a by-the-book approach; The pirates used AK-47s, a rocket propelled grenade launcher, a grappling hook and attempted to affix a ladder onto the boat. The pirates threw their weapons overboard so the boarding team could not arrest them. They gave the pirates food and water, finally turning them loose. The Somalis did not realize that a helicopter from the USS Mobile Bay was keeping track of their movements. The pirates headed back to the Iranian dhow. The USS Kidd was able to track the Al Mulahi and noticed some Middle Easterners were aboard. The New York Times reported a standoff, afterwards the Somalis were still hidden and the Iranian captain spoke with the Americans.

== Formation ==
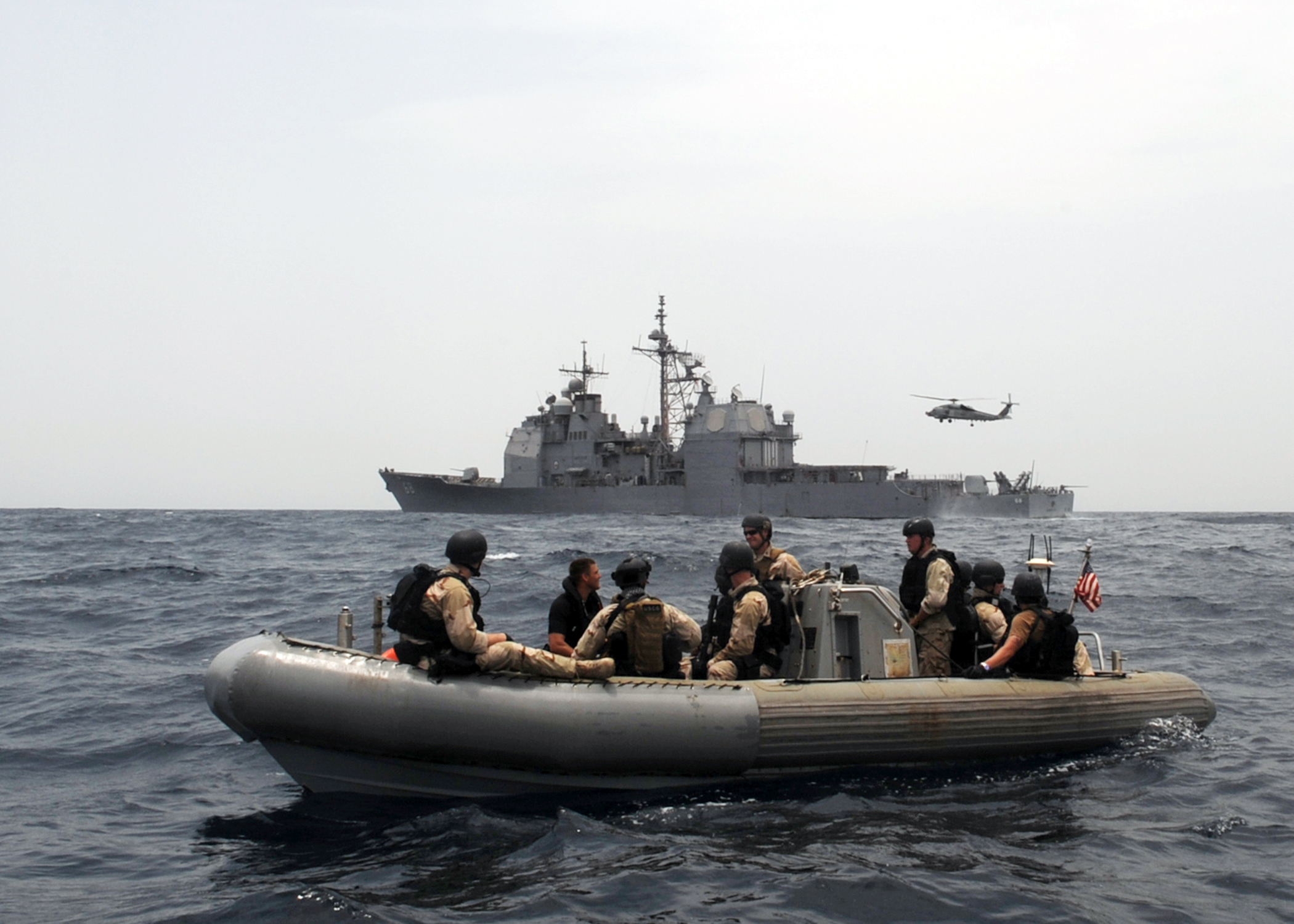
Members of U.S. Coast Guard Maritime Safety and Security Team (MSST) 91104 prepare to investigate a skiff during a maritime security operation

Between 2002 and 2004, a first naval coalition in charge of fighting terrorism in the area was dubbed Task Force 151.

On 8 January 2009, at the United States Fifth Fleet headquarters in Manama, Bahrain, Vice Admiral William E. Gortney, USN, announced the formation of CTF-151 to combat the piracy threat off Somalia, with Rear Admiral Terence E. McKnight in command. The USS San Antonio (LPD-17) was designated as the first flagship of Combined Task Force 151, serving as an afloat forward staging base (AFSB) for the following force elements:

- Fourteen-member U.S. Navy visit, board, search and seizure (VBSS) team.
- United States Coast Guard Deployable Operations Group, comprising around two dozen Maritime Safety and Security Team (MSST) 91104 members and one of the eight-member Law Enforcement Detachments (LEDETs): Law Enforcement Detachment 405.
- Scout Sniper Platoon, 2nd Battalion, 6th Marine Regiment, 26th Marine Expeditionary Unit cross-decked from the USS Iwo Jima (LHD-7).
- 3rd Platoon (Golf Company, 26th MEU), a military police detachment, and intelligence personnel.
- Fleet Surgical Team 8 with level-two surgical capability to deal with trauma, surgical, critical care and medical evacuation needs.
- Approximately 75 Marines with six AH-1 SuperCobra (AH-1Ws) and two UH-1N Huey helicopters from Marine Medium Helicopter Squadron 264 (HMM-264) of the 26th MEU cross-decked from the USS Iwo Jima.
- Three HH-60H helicopters from Helicopter Anti-Submarine Squadron 3 (HS-3) cross-decked from the USS Theodore Roosevelt (CVN-71).

Initially, CTF-151 consisted of the San Antonio, USS Mahan (DDG-72), and HMS Portland (F79), with additional warships expected to join this force. Twenty countries were expected to contribute to the force, including Canada, Denmark, France, Japan, Republic of Korea, the Netherlands, Pakistan, Singapore, Thailand and the United Kingdom, all of which have already pledged participation.

On 5 April 2009, United States Rear Admiral Michelle J. Howard, assumed command of CTF-151 and Expeditionary Strike Group 2. On 29 May, the Australian Government pledged its support, re-tasking the frigate HMAS Warramunga (FFH 152) from duties in the Persian Gulf to the task force, as well as Lockheed P-3 Orion maritime patrol aircraft.

== Task measures ==
The measures carried out by the task force include: Upholding an active 24-hour lookout, the removal of access ladders, reporting apprehensive actions to proper authorities, the use of deck lighting, razor wire, netting, fire hoses, electrical fencing, and surveillance and detection equipment, defending the lowest points of access, engaging in evasive maneuvering and speed through pirate attacks, and joining group transits.

The CMF established the Maritime Security Patrol Area (MSPA) in the Gulf of Aden in August 2008 to provision international efforts to battle piracy. The coalition efforts involved CTF-150 assets patrolling the area with aircraft and ships. However, the charter for CTF-150, which was established at the beginning of Operation Enduring Freedom, was for the conduct of Maritime Security Operations in the Gulf of Oman, Gulf of Aden, the Arabian Sea, the Indian Ocean and the Red Sea. Such operations included the deterrence of threatening activities, such as weapons trafficking and drug smuggling.

== Rescue of Captain Richard Phillips ==
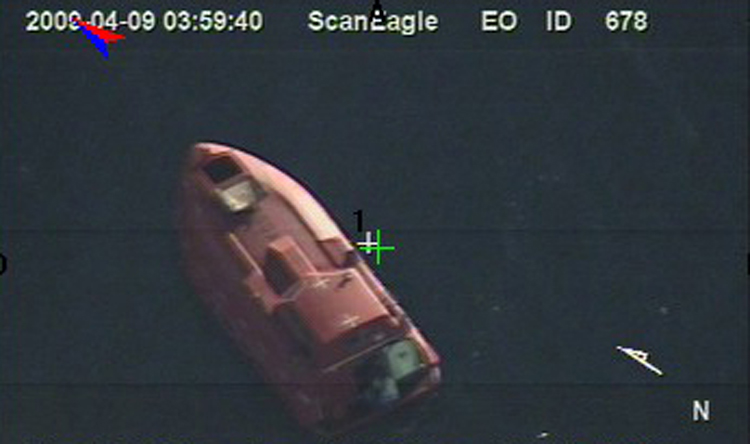
Surveillance photo of Maersk Alabama lifeboat, hijacked by Somali pirates

In 2009, there was a pirate attack on the Maersk Alabama. The rescue personnel included SEAL Team Six. On 7 April 2009 there was an advisory issued by the U.S. Maritime Administration stating that ships stay six hundred miles off the coast of Somalia due to an increase of piracy. The Somali pirates mainly targeted the Gulf of Aden because most vessels traveling towards the Suez Canal were there. However, with CTF 151, the Chinese, Russians, and Operation Atalanta all concentrated in that area, pirates were compelled to look elsewhere. On 1 April 2009 the Maersk Alabama headed toward the Gulf of Aden. Captain Phillips was unaware of the pirates on the way . Captain Phillips and his crew were eventually surrounded by three pirate skiffs with their mother ship in pursuit, eight miles behind. Phillips eventually hit the silent alarm button that signaled a search and rescue team to come. At one point it was reported that there was a standoff between the ship's crew and the pirates. They eventually called for a prisoner exchange and Phillips was among the first to be released onto a lifeboat.

== Success ==
Vice Admiral Bill Gortney stated that because of proactive measures taken by certain merchant mariners, the piracy events in the region have been reduced. He also cautioned that the "efforts of coalition and international navies won't solve the problem of piracy."

== List of Commanders ==
- (Canada) Commodore Roger Girouard, RCN as Task Force 151
- (United States) Rear Admiral Terence E. McKnight, USN
- (United States) Rear Admiral Michelle Howard, USN
- (United States) Rear Admiral Scott Eugene Sanders, USN
- (Turkey) Rear Admiral Caner Bener, TN
- (Singapore) Rear Admiral Bernard Miranda, RSN
- (South Korea) Rear Admiral Lee Beom-rim, ROKN
- (Turkey) Rear Admiral Sinan Ertuğrul, TN
- (Pakistan) Commodore Abdul Aleem, PN
- (Singapore) Rear Admiral Harris Chan Weng Yip, RSN
- (New Zealand) Captain Jim Gilmour, RNZN
- (Pakistan) Rear Admiral Kaleem Shaukat, PN
- (Denmark) Commodore Aage Buur Jensen, Danish Navy
- (Thailand) Rear Admiral Tanin Likitawong, RTN
- (South Korea) Rear Admiral Anho Chung, ROKN
- (Turkey) Rear Admiral Oguz Karaman, TN
- (Pakistan) Commodore Muhammad Hisham, PN
- (Singapore) Rear Admiral Giam Hock Koon, RSN
- (Pakistan) Commodore Muhammad Ihsan Qadir, PN
- (United Kingdom) Commodore Jeremy Blunden LVO, RN
- (Denmark) Commodore Aage Buur Jensen, Danish Navy 2nd Term
- (Pakistan) Commodore Ali Abbas SI(M), PN
- (South Korea) Rear Admiral Cho Young Joo, ROKN
- (New Zealand) Commodore Tony Millar, MNZM, RNZN
- (Thailand) Rear Admiral Pakorn Wanich, RTN
- (Pakistan) Commodore Asif Hameed Siddiqui, PN
- (Japan) Rear Admiral Hiroshi Ito, JMSDF
- (Turkey) Captain Ayhan Bay, TN
- (Pakistan) Rear Admiral Zahid Ilyas, PN
- (Singapore) Rear Admiral Cheong Kwok Chien, RSN
- (South Korea) Rear Admiral Nam Dong Woo, ROKN
- Commodore Muhammad Shuaib SI (M), Pakistan Navy
- (Japan) Rear Admiral Tatsuya Fukuda, JMSDF
- (Turkey) Rear Admiral Emre Sezenler, TN
- (Bahrain) Commodore Yusuf Almannaei, RBNF
- (Japan) Rear Admiral Daisuke Kajimoto, JMSDF
- (Singapore) Rear Admiral Saw Shi Tat, RSN
- Captain Ali Al Rashidi, Kuwait Naval Force
- Captain Alajmi, Kuwait Naval Force
- (South Korea) Rear Admiral Byeong-Ju Yu, ROKN
- Captain Khaled Hasan Al Kandari, Kuwait Naval Force
- (Japan) Rear Admiral Yoshiyasu Ishimaki, JMSDF
- (Turkey) Rear Admiral Nejat Inanir, TN
- Commodore Abdul Munib, Pakistan Navy
- (Brazil) Rear Admiral André Luiz Andrade Felix, Brazilian Navy
- (Kuwait)
- Commodore Ahmed Hussain, Pakistan Navy
- (Brazil)
- (South Korea) Rear Admiral Ko Seung-bum, ROKN
- (Philippines) Capt. Mateo G. Carido, Philippine Navy
- (Brazil) Rear Admiral Antonio Braz de Souza, Brazilian Navy
- (Turkey) Rear Admiral Rüştü Sezer, TN
- Commodore Sohail Ahmed Azmie, Pakistan Navy (Current)

== Command history ==
The Task Force has been headed by different countries participating.

Term of command
Date	Country
11 January 2009	US
5 April 2009	US
3 May 2009	Turkey
13 August 2009	US
20 January 2010	Singapore
21 April 2010	Republic of Korea
1 September 2010	Turkey
29 November 2010	Pakistan
31 March 2011	Singapore
1 July 2011	New Zealand
27 September 2011	Pakistan
13 January 2012	Denmark
29 March 2012	Thailand
18 June 2012	Republic of Korea
19 September 2012	Turkey
13 December 2012	Pakistan
7 March 2013	Singapore
6 June 2013	Pakistan
5 September 2013	UK
12 December 2013	Denmark
27 February 2014	Pakistan
12 June 2014	Republic of Korea
28 August 2014	New Zealand
25 November 2014	Thailand
26 February 2015	Pakistan
31 May 2015	Japan
27 August 2015	Turkey
21 December 2015	Pakistan
31 March 2016	Singapore
30 June 2016	Republic of Korea
27 October 2016	Pakistan
9 March 2017	Japan
29 June 2017	Turkey
2 November 2017	Bahrain
1 March 2018	Japan
28 June 2018	Singapore
27 September 2018	Kuwait
21 February 2019	Kuwait
20 June 2019	Republic of Korea
20 October 2019	Kuwait
20 February 2020	Japan
21 July 2020	Turkey
18 December 2020	Pakistan
10 June 2021	Brazil
18 November 2021	Jordan
14 April 2022	Pakistan
18 August 2022	Brazil
17 February 2023	Republic of Korea
21 August 2023	Philippines
23 January 2024	Brazil
24 July 2024	Turkey
22 January 2025	Pakistan
27 August 2025	Brazil
23 February 2026	UK

Command history
Country	No. of times
Pakistan	11
Turkey	7
Republic of Korea	6
Singapore	5
Japan	4
Brazil	4
Kuwait	3
US	3
Denmark	2
New Zealand	2
Thailand	2
UK	2
Bahrain	1
Jordan	1
Philippines	1

== See also ==
- Operation Atalanta—EU operation in the area
- Operation Ocean Shield—NATO operation in the area
- Combined Task Force 150—similar patrol in the Indian Ocean that deals with counter-terrorism
- Maritime Security Patrol Area
- Maersk Alabama hijacking in April 2009
