= Piracy off the coast of Somalia =

Hijacking of ships by Somali pirates

- Part of the Somali Civil War and piracy around the Horn of Africa
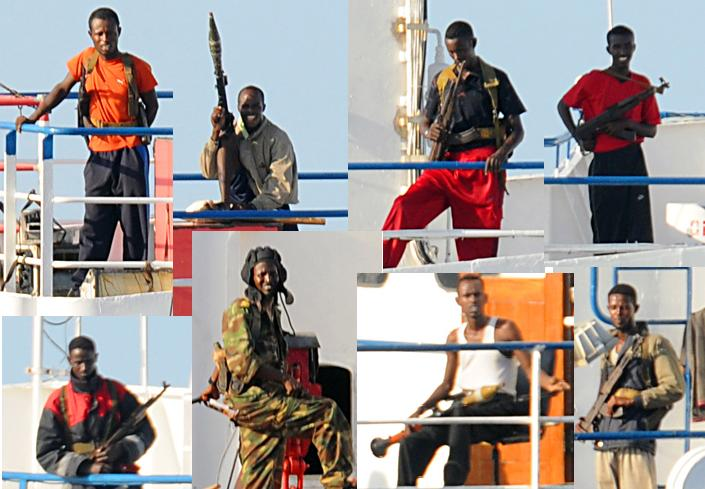
- Photomontage of Somali pirates on the MV Faina.
Date	2000–present
Location	Gulf of Aden, Guardafui Channel, Bab-el-Mandeb, Arabian Sea, Indian Ocean
Status	Ongoing, continued presence of pirates.

Belligerents
Somalia Allies: Kenya; United Kingdom; United States; France; Japan; Russia; India; Bangladesh; Indonesia; Malaysia; Italy; Iran; Germany; Spain; United Arab Emirates; Netherlands; Pakistan; Belgium; Australia; New Zealand; Denmark; Sweden; Finland; Norway; Ukraine; Canada; China; South Africa; Montenegro; Croatia; North Korea; Greece; Turkey; Portugal; South Korea; Puntland	Pirates: (Somalia) Somali pirates; Central Regional Coast Guard; Hobyo-Harardheere network (Salebaan clan); Laasqoray Action Group; Ali Zwahila group; Former: National Volunteer Coast Guard (NVCG); Somali Marines; Marka group; Puntland Group; Al-Qaeda; (Islamic Wilayaat of Somalia) Al-Shabaab; Islamic State; Somalia Province; (Yemen) Yemeni pirates; (Yemen) Houthis

Commanders and leaders
	See list of Somali pirates

Strength
	Local fishermen; Ex-militiamen; Technical experts

Piracy occurs in the Gulf of Aden, Guardafui Channel, and Indian Ocean, in Somali territorial waters and other surrounding places and has a long troubled history with different perspectives from different communities. It was initially a threat to international fishing vessels during the early 2000s, only to rapidly escalate and expand to international shipping during the War in Somalia (2006–2009). The escalation of conflict between local Somali fishermen and foreign vessels occurred in a context where Somalia is estimated to lose approximately $300 million annually since 1991 due to the unauthorized extraction of marine resources using harmful methods, such as dynamite fishing, which is prohibited in a number of other regions.

== Probable causes ==
Coastal Somali communities report that the conflict originated from their need to defend themselves against foreign trawlers that steal fish and restrict access to traditional fishing grounds. They also claim that the dumping of toxic and nuclear waste from Europe into their waters has resulted in severe environmental damage, including the death of children. Although several narratives exist surrounding this phenomenon, the coastal groups refer to themselves as the "people's coastguard", and this self-designation is widely recognized.

Somali waters have high fisheries production potential, but the sustainability of those fisheries is compromised by the presence of foreign fishing vessels, a number of them fishing illegally. The Somali domestic fishing sector is small and poorly developed, whereas foreign vessels have fished in Somali waters for at least seven decades. Some foreign vessels and their crew have been viewed by Somali artisanal fishers as a threat to their traditional livelihoods. Multiple foreign vessels directly compete for fish, reducing fish populations and destroying marine habitat through bottom trawling. Foreign fishing has increased more than twenty-fold since 1981, and the most rapid increase occurred during the 1990s after the collapse of the Federal government under Siad Barre and the ensuing civil war.

The Somali Civil War has been ongoing, with periods of calm at certain times and places, since the late 1980s. The Somali Navy dissolved by ~1991. This vacuum has been exploited by often large foreign fishing boats, further threatening the livelihoods of local Somali fishing communities.

The fishing community responded by forming armed groups to deter what they perceived as invaders. These groups, using small boats such as skiffs and motorized boats, would sometimes hold vessels and crew for ransom. Some pirates have indicated that they would cease their activities if a national Somali coastguard were established that could effectively secure Somali waters. This practice grew into a lucrative trade, where large ransom payments were demanded and often paid.

These groups were then considered to be pirates, especially after they began hijacking non-fishing commercial vessels. With the region badly affected by poverty and government corruption, there was little political motivation at the local level to deal with the crisis. Large numbers of unemployed Somali youth began to see it as a means of making money. International organizations began to express concern over the new wave of piracy due to its high cost to global trade and the incentive to profiteer by insurance companies and others. Some believe that elements within Somalia collaborated with the pirates both to strengthen their political influence as well as for financial gain.

After the 1998 United States embassy bombings, the USS Cole bombing in 2000 in Aden, Yemen, followed by the September 11 attacks in 2001 on the United States, the US Navy decided to step up its activities around the Horn of Africa and the Red Sea, by establishing in stages a multinational anti-piracy coalition known as Combined Task Force 150 (CTF 150), with an Area of Responsibility (AOR) including some of the world's busiest shipping lanes, spanning over two million square miles, covering the Red Sea, Gulf of Aden, Indian Ocean and Gulf of Oman (but not inside the Persian Gulf, which is the responsibility of CTF 152). This area is a vital artery of world trade from the Far East to Europe and the US, with thousands of shipping movements per year including the transportation of over 27 million barrels of oil. The participating nations have included Australia, Canada, Denmark, France, Germany, Italy, Netherlands, New Zealand, Pakistan, Spain, Saudi Arabia, the United Kingdom and the United States. Command of CTF 150 generally rotates between nations on a four month basis.

By 2010, these patrols succeeded in steadily reducing the number of piracy incidents. The details of several tactics employed by CTF 150 and, later, CTF 151 have remained classified, but operations included maritime interdiction, "on the sand" and littoral surveillance, eavesdropping and signals intelligence efforts, and infiltration of pirate networks, including encouraging red-on-red activity among pirate groups. Between 2012 and 2016, as more information became declassified, experts and intelligence personnel who were in Somalia at the time began to publish writings about these tactics and their effectiveness.

In early 2017, a few incidents of piracy were reported as the navies of Asian and European nations began to more actively rescue hijacked ships, including the bulk carrier OS35.

In January 2023, the Indian Ocean High Risk Area (HRA) was lifted by the International Maritime Bureau (IMB) due to a significant absence of Somali pirate attacks in previous years, although Somali pirates still reportedly possess the ability and resources to conduct attacks in the Gulf of Aden region.

As a derivative effect of the escalating Gaza war at the end of 2023, new piracy-related activity rose on the Somalia coast. According to the International Maritime Bureau (IMB) the first successful hijacking of a cargo vessel in the area after six years happened in December 2023. On 17 March 2024 Indian naval commandos led a rescue operation taking back control of the vessel about 500 km off the coast of Somalia, bringing the 35 Somali pirates to prosecution in Mumbai. This resurfacing of piracy in the area is closely linked to the unaltered root causes and the instability that the war creates in the area.

== History ==
In the early 1980s, prior to the outbreak of the civil war in Somalia, the Somali Ministry of Fisheries and the Coastal Development Agency (CDA) launched a development program focusing on the establishment of agricultural and fishery cooperatives for artisanal fishermen. It also received significant foreign investment funds for various fishery development projects, as the Somali fishing industry was considered to have a lot of potential owing to its unexploited marine stocks. The government at this time permitted foreign fishing through official licensing or joint venture agreements, forming two such partnerships in the Iraqi-Somali Siadco and Italian-Somali Somital ventures.

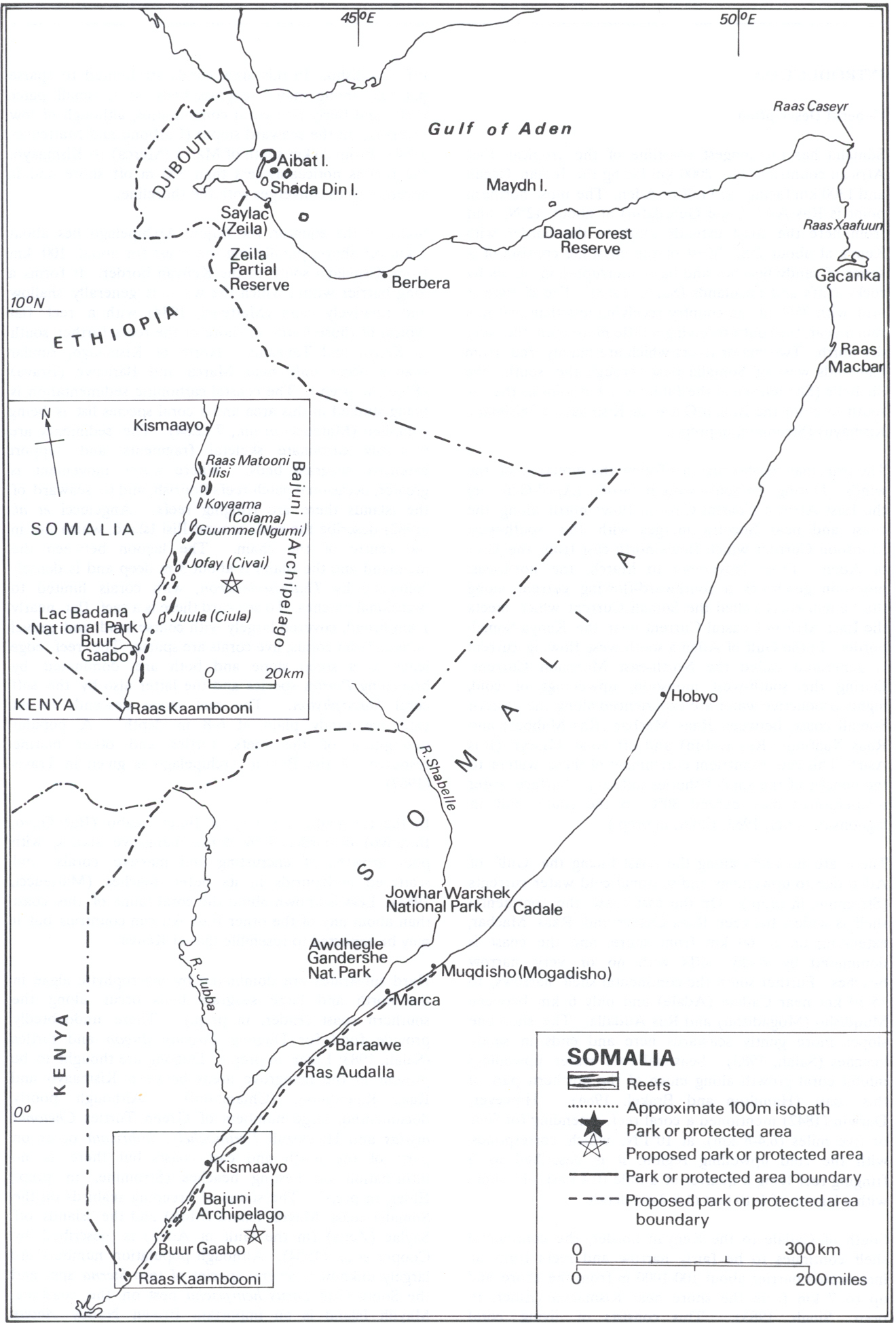
Somalia's coral reefs, ecological parks and protected areas

After the collapse of the central government in the ensuing civil war, the Somali Navy disbanded in 1990–1991. With Somali territorial waters undefended, foreign fishing trawlers began illegally fishing on the Somali seaboard and ships began dumping industrial and other waste off the Somali coast. This led to erosion of the fish stock and local fishermen started to band together to try to protect their resources. An escalation began, leading to weapons being used and tactics such as taking over a foreign ship until their owners paid a ransom.

Pirate activity reportedly began off the coast around 2000, but rapidly escalated during the War in Somalia from 2006 to 2009. During the Islamic Court Union's six-month rule of southern Somalia in the months prior, pirate activity completely ceased due to the extensive anti-piracy operations conducted by the courts. After the organization's collapse in early 2007, piracy sharply increased. Reportedly, elements within the Transitional Federal Government (TFG) were involved in the lucrative piracy business during this early period. Seeing the profitability of ransom payments, some financiers and former militiamen started to fund pirate activities, sharing the profits equally with the pirates. In most of the hijackings, the pirates have not harmed their prisoners.

Combined Task Force 150, a multinational coalition task force, subsequently took on the role of fighting piracy off the coast of Somalia by establishing a Maritime Security Patrol Area (MSPA) within the Gulf of Aden. However, a number of foreign naval vessels chasing pirates were forced to break off when the pirates entered Somali territorial waters. To address this, in June 2008, following a letter from the Somali TFG to the President of the UN Security Council requesting assistance for the TFG's efforts to tackle acts of piracy off the coast of Somalia, the UN Security Council unanimously passed a declaration authorizing nations that have the consent of the Transitional Federal Government to enter Somali territorial waters to deal with pirates. On the advice of lawyers, the Royal Navy and other international naval forces have often released suspected pirates that they have captured because, although the men are frequently armed, they have not been caught engaging in acts of piracy and have thus not technically committed a crime.

Due to improved anti-piracy measures the success of piracy acts on sea decreased dramatically by the end of 2011, with only 4 vessels hijacked in the last quarter versus 17 in the last quarter of the preceding year. In response, pirates resorted to increased hostage taking on land. The government of the autonomous Puntland region has also made progress in combating piracy, evident in interventions by its maritime police force (PMPF).

In part to further curtail piracy activity, the London Somalia Conference was convened in February 2012.

According to the International Maritime Bureau, by October 2012, pirate attacks in the Indian Ocean had dropped to a six-year low. Attempted hijackings fell from 237 in 2011 to 75 the following year, with successful attacks plummeting from 28 in 2011 to 14 in 2012. Additionally, only one ship was attacked in the third quarter of 2012 compared to 36 during the same period in 2011.

=== Summary of events ===
Extent of pirate attacks on shipping vessels in the Indian Ocean between 2005 and 2010.

Somali pirates have attacked hundreds of vessels in the Arabian Sea and Indian Ocean region, though most attacks do not result in a successful hijacking. In 2008, there were 111 attacks, which included 42 successful hijackings. However, this is only a fraction of the up to 30,000 merchant vessels that pass through that area. The rate of attacks in January and February 2009 was about 10 times higher than during the same period in 2008 and "there have been almost daily attacks in March", with 79 attacks, 21 successful, by mid-April. Most of these attacks occurred in the Gulf of Aden but subsequently the pirates increased their range and started attacking ships as far south as off the coast of Kenya in the Indian Ocean. Below are some notable pirate events that have garnered significant media coverage since 2007.

==== 2005 ====
The United States Coast Guard cutter USCGC Munro, working with the British aircraft carrier HMS Invincible and destroyer HMS Nottingham in the Gulf of Aden, intercepted a hijacked vessel at around noon on 17 March. The interception was ordered after Commander, U.S. Naval Forces Central Command (COMUSNAVCENT) received telephone reports from the International Maritime Bureau's Piracy Reporting Center in Kuala Lumpur, Malaysia, concerning the hijacking of the Thai-flagged fishing boat Sirichai Nava 12 by three Somalis on the evening of 16 March, as well as a fax indicating that the hijackers demanded U.S. $800,000 in ransom for the vessel's crew.

Commander, Combined Task Force (CTF) 150 tasked Invincible, Nottingham and Munro to investigate the situation. A Visit, Board, Search and Seizure (VBSS) team from Munro boarded Sirichai Nava, while a boarding team from Nottingham went on to a second fishing vessel, Ekhwat Patana, which was with the Thai vessel. Munro's boarding team detained the Somalis without incident.

One of the crew members of the Thai vessel had a minor flesh wound, which was treated by the Munro boarding team. The Coast Guardsmen also discovered four automatic weapons in the pilothouse, expended ammunition shells on the deck of the vessel, as well as ammunition on the detained suspects. The three suspects were transferred to Munro.

==== 2007 ====
On 28 May 2007, a Chinese sailor was killed by the pirates because the ship's owners failed to meet their ransom demand.

On 3 June 2007, USS Carter Hall, a landing ship dock, engaged pirates attacking the freighter MV Danica White, but failed to repel them.

In October 2007, Somali pirates hijacked a North Korean cargo ship in the Dai Hong Dan incident. Somali pirates took the North Korean sailors hostage, prompting the United States to come to its aid—an uncommon occurrence between both nations at the time. A U.S. Naval vessel, the USS James E. Williams, assisted North Korean sailors in reclaiming their ship. Three Somali pirates and six North Korean sailors were wounded during the operation. The U.S. was thanked by North Korea for its help shortly afterwards.

On 28 October 2007, the destroyer USS Porter, opened fire on pirates who had captured a freighter and, with other vessels, blockaded a port the pirates attempted to take refuge in.

==== 2008 ====
On 5 October 2008, the United Nations Security Council adopted resolution 1838 calling on nations with vessels in the area to apply military force to repress the acts of piracy. At the 101st council of the International Maritime Organization, India called for a United Nations peacekeeping force under unified command to tackle piracy off Somalia. (There has been a general and complete arms embargo against Somalia since 1992.)

In November 2008, Somali pirates began hijacking ships well outside the Gulf of Aden, perhaps targeting ships headed for the port of Mombasa, Kenya. The frequency and sophistication of the attacks also increased around this time, as did the size of vessels being targeted. Large cargo ships, oil and chemical tankers on international voyages became the new targets of choice for the Somali hijackers. This is in stark contrast to the pirate attacks that were once frequent in the Strait of Malacca, another strategically important waterway for international trade, which were, according to maritime security expert Catherine Zara Raymond, generally directed against "smaller, more vulnerable vessels carrying trade across the Straits or employed in the coastal trade on either side of the Straits."

On 19 November 2008, the Indian Navy warship INS Tabar sank a suspected pirate mothership. Later, it was claimed to be a Thai trawler being hijacked by pirates. The Indian Navy later defended its actions by stating that its ship was fired upon first. On 21 November 2008, BBC News reported that the Indian Navy had received United Nations approval to enter Somali waters to combat piracy.

==== 2009 ====
On 8 April 2009, four Somali pirates seized MV Maersk Alabama 240 nautical miles (440 km; 280 mi) southeast of the Somalia port city of Eyl. The ship was carrying 17,000 tonnes of cargo, of which 5,000 tonnes were relief supplies bound for Somalia, Uganda, and Kenya. On 12 April 2009, U.S. Navy SEAL snipers killed the three pirates who were holding Captain Richard Phillips hostage aboard a lifeboat from Maersk Alabama after determining that Captain Phillips' life was in immediate danger. A fourth pirate, Abdul Wali Muse, surrendered and was taken into custody. He pled guilty to hijacking, kidnapping and hostage-taking charges, receiving a sentence of 33 years and 9 months in Federal prison.

On 20 April 2009, United States Secretary of State Hillary Clinton commented on the capture and release of seven Somali pirates by Dutch Naval forces who were on a NATO mission. After an attack on Handytankers Magic, a petroleum tanker, the Dutch frigate De Zeven Provinciën tracked the pirates back to a pirate mothership and captured them. They confiscated the pirates' weapons and freed 20 Yemeni fishermen whom the pirates had kidnapped and who had been forced to sail the pirate mothership. Since the Dutch Naval Forces were part of a NATO exercise, but not on an EU mission, they lacked legal jurisdiction to keep the pirates so they released them. Clinton stated that this action "sends the wrong signal" and that additional coordination was needed among nations.

On 23 April 2009, international donors pledged over $250 million for Somalia, including $134 million to increase the African Union peacekeeping mission from 4,350 troops to 8,000 troops and $34 million for Somali security forces. Secretary-General of the United Nations Ban Ki-moon told delegates at a donors' conference sponsored by the UN that "piracy is a symptom of anarchy and insecurity on the ground" and that "more security on the ground will make less piracy on the seas." Somali President Sharif Ahmed pledged at the conference that he would fight piracy and to loud applause said that "it is our duty to pursue these criminals not only on the high seas, but also on terra firma". The Somali government has not gone after pirates because pirate leaders currently have more power than the government. In 2008 the pirates are estimated to have gained about $80 million through ransom payments.

George Mason University professor Peter Leeson suggested that the international community appropriate Somali territorial waters and sell them, together with the international portion of the Gulf of Aden, to a private company which would then provide security from piracy in exchange for charging tolls to world shipping through the Gulf.

On 2 May 2009, Somali pirates captured MV Ariana with its 24 Ukrainian crew. The ship was released on 10 December 2009 after a ransom of almost US$3,000,000 was paid.

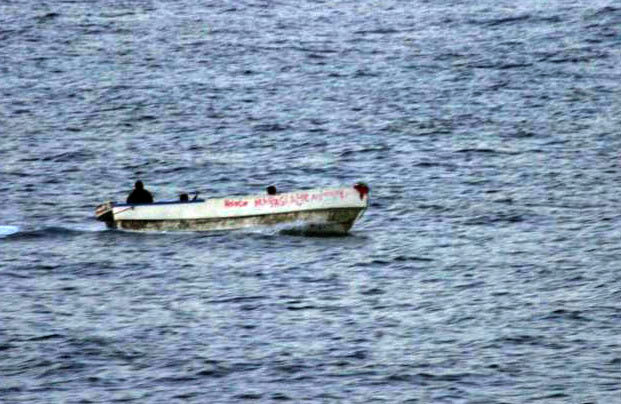
Armed pirates in the Indian Ocean near Somalia. After the picture was taken, the vessel's crew members opened fire on U.S. Navy ships and the ship's crew members returned fire. One suspected pirate was killed and 12 were taken into custody (see engaged pirate vessels).

On 8 November 2009, Somali pirates threatened that a kidnapped British couple, the Chandlers, would be "punished" if a German warship did not release seven pirates. Omer, one of the pirates holding the British couple, claimed the seven men were fishermen, but a European Union Naval Force spokesman stated they were captured as they fired AK-47 assault rifles at a French fishing vessel. The Chandlers were released on 14 November 2010 after 388 days of captivity. At least two ransom payments, reportedly over £500,000, had been made.

==== 2010 ====
In April 2010, the Central Intelligence Agency (CIA) alluded to possible covert and overt action against the pirates. CIA officials had been publicly warning of this potential threat for months. In a Harper's Magazine article, a CIA official said, "We need to deal with this problem from the beach side, in concert with the ocean side, but we don't have an embassy in Somalia and limited, ineffective intelligence operations. We need to work in Somalia and in Lebanon, where a lot of the ransom money has changed hands. But our operations in Lebanon are a joke, and we have no presence at all in Somalia".

In early May 2010, Russian special forces retook a Russian oil tanker that had been hijacked by 11 pirates. One died in the assault, and a week later Russian military officials reported that the remainder were freed due to weaknesses in international law but died before reaching the Somali coast. Russian President Dmitry Medvedev had announced the day the ship was retaken that "we'll have to do what our forefathers did when they met the pirates" until a suitable way of prosecuting them is available.

On 11 May 2010, Somali pirates seized a Bulgarian-flagged ship in the Gulf of Aden. Panega, with 15 Bulgarian crew members aboard, was en route from the Red Sea to India or Pakistan. This was the first such hijacking of a Bulgarian-flagged ship. On 12 May 2010, Athens announced that Somali pirates had seized a Greek vessel in the Gulf of Aden with at least 24 people on board, including two Greek citizens and several Philippine citizens. The vessel, sailing under the Liberian flag, was transporting iron from Ukraine to China.

==== 2011 ====
On 14 January 2011, while speaking to reporters, Commodore Michiel Hijmans of the Royal Netherlands Navy stated that the use of hijacked vessels in more recent hijackings had led to increased range of pirating activities, as well as difficulty to actively thwart future events due to the use of kidnapped sailors as human shields.

On 20 January, Royal Malaysian Navy PASKAL assault teams engaged seven Somali pirates on board the Japanese-Malaysian chemical freighter MT Bunga Laurel, about 300 nautical miles (560 km; 350 mi) east of Oman, near the Gulf of Aden and Arabian Sea. 3 pirates were wounded, 4 pirates captured, and 23 Filipino hostages were freed after gunfighting aboard the vessel.

On 15 January 2011 13 Somali pirates seized Samho Jewelry, a Maltese-flagged chemical carrier operated by Samho Shipping, 650 km southeast of Muscat. The Republic of Korea Navy destroyer Choi Young shadowed Samho Jewelry for several days. In the early morning of 21 January 2011, 25 ROK Navy SEALs on small boats launched from Choi Young boarded Samho Jewelry while Choi Young's Westland Super Lynx provided covering fire. Eight pirates were killed and five captured in the operation; the crew of 21 was freed with the captain suffering a gunshot wound to the stomach. The captain fully recovered later.

On 28 January 2011, an Indian Coast Guard aircraft while responding to a distress call from CMA CGM Verdi, located two skiffs attempting a piracy attack near Lakshadweep. Seeing the aircraft, the skiffs immediately aborted their piracy attempt and dashed towards the mother vessel, MV Prantalay 14 – a hijacked Thai trawler, which hurriedly hoisted the two skiffs on board and moved westward. The Indian Navy deployed INS Cankaraso (T73), which located and engaged the mothership 100 nautical miles (190 km) north of the Minicoy island. Ten pirates were killed while 15 were apprehended and 20 Thai and Burmese fishermen being held aboard the ship as hostages were rescued.

Within a week of its previous success, the Indian Navy captured another hijacked Thai trawler, MV Prantalay 11 and captured 28 pirates aboard in an operation undertaken by INS Tir pursuant to receiving information that a Greek merchant ship had been attacked by pirates on board high-speed boats, although it had managed to avoid capture. When INS Tir ordered the pirate ship to stop and be boarded for inspection, it was fired upon. INS Tir returned fire in which three pirates were injured and caused the pirates to raise a white flag indicating their surrender. INS Tir subsequently was joined by CGS Samar of the Indian Coast Guard. Officials from the Indian Navy reported that a total of 52 men were apprehended, but of that 24 are believed to be Thai fishermen who were hostages of the 28 African pirates.

In late February 2011, piracy targeting smaller yachts and collecting ransom made headlines when four Americans were killed aboard their vessel, Quest, by their captors, while a military ship shadowed them. A federal court in Norfolk, Virginia, sentenced three members of the gang that seized the yacht to life imprisonment. On 24 February 2011 a Danish family on a yacht were captured by pirates.

In March 2011, the Indian Navy intercepted a pirate mother vessel 600 nautical miles (1,100 km) west of the Indian coast in the Arabian Sea and rescued 13 hostages; the names of some of the 13 hostages are: James Blaydes, Thomas Walton, Lucas Pittman, Thomas Strauss, William Dickey, Jett Rice, Jude Coppola, and Rex Reeves; the names of the others were not found. Sixty-one pirates were also caught in the operation carried out by Navy's INS Kalpeni (T75).

In late March 2011, the Indian Navy seized 16 suspected pirates after a three-hour-long battle in the Arabian Sea, The navy also rescued 16 crew members of a hijacked Iranian ship west of the Lakshadweep Islands. The crew included 12 Iranians and four Pakistanis.

On 12 April, HDMS Esbern Snare intercepted a pirate vessel, capturing 34 pirates and freeing 34 hostages. Later that day, HNLMS Tromp opened fire on another pirate vessel, killing 2 pirates.

A hijacked dhow was hailed by USS Bainbridge on 10 May, after which 7 pirates on board immediately surrendered. The ship's 15 crew members claimed they were hijacked six months prior and their ship was used as a mothership for the pirates.

On 16 May, USS Stephen W. Groves exchanged fire with Jih Chun Tsai 68, a known pirate mothership. When a boarding team arrived, they found 3 pirates dead and captured 2 pirates.

The Danish Navy vessel, HDMS Esbern Snare exchanged fire with a hijacked boat, killing 4 pirates on 17 May. A boarding team subsequently captured 24 injured pirates and freed 16 hostages.

On 11 September, a Spanish Navy patrol boat engaged Somali pirates, freeing a French hostage after sinking the pirate skiff and capturing 7 pirates. A woman was taken hostage after pirates killed her husband and left her catamaran off the coast of Yemen.

On 3 October, the Tanzania navy freed a hijacked vessel and apprehended seven pirates, They were handed over to civilian police for further action.

On 11 October, Royal Marines embarked on board RFA Fort Victoria, freed 23 crew members of a hijacked Italian cargo ship after it had been captured by pirates five days earlier. USS DeWert was the first vessel to arrive on scene after gathering intelligence on the whereabouts of the vessel and deploying counter intelligence surveillance units in the area.

On 31 October, the Kenyan military announced that they had captured two pirate skiffs, sunk three, and killed 18 pirates.

In October 2011, Jessica Buchanan and Poul Hagen Thisted, while working on a Danish Refugee Council demining project, were kidnapped in Galkayo. The pair were rescued in January 2012.

==== 2012 ====
On 5 January 2012, an MH-60S Seahawk from the guided-missile destroyer USS Kidd, part of Carrier Strike Group 3 led by the USS John C. Stennis, detected a suspected pirate skiff alongside the Iranian-flagged fishing boat, Al Molai. The master of Al Molai sent a distress call about the same time reporting pirates were holding him captive.

A team from Kidd boarded the dhow, a traditional Arabian sailing vessel, and detained 15 suspected pirates who had been holding a 13-member Iranian crew hostage for several weeks. Al Molai had been hijacked and used as a mothership for pirate operations throughout the Persian Gulf, members of the Iranian vessel's crew reported.

Acting on intelligence, USS Carney boarded the Indian-flagged dhow Al Qashmi on 6 January. By the time the search team boarded, all evidence of potential piracy had been disposed of, though the crew said they were hijacked by the nine pirates on board from a different vessel. The nine suspected pirates were disarmed and given sufficient fuel and provisions to return to Somalia.

The next day, the Danish warship HDMS Absalon intercepted an Iranian-flagged dhow after identifying it as a potential pirate mother ship. Warning shots had to be fired before a search team boarded. In addition to the crew of 5 Iranian and 9 Pakistani nationals, the team seized 25 pirates. The captured pirates were then taken aboard Absalon to determine whether they should be prosecuted.

A third pirate vessel was intercepted on 13 January. RFA Fort Victoria fired off warning shots to stop the vessel and then launched a boarding party. The pirates surrendered without incident and search uncovered several rocket-propelled grenades and automatic weapons. Royal Marines held the pirates for further investigation.

On 21 January 2012, while researching a book on piracy via a Pulitzer Center for Crisis Reporting grant, journalist Michael Scott Moore was abducted in Galkayo by a local gang of pirates. The pirates demanded $20 million. U.S. and German Foreign Ministry officials negotiated with the pirates until Moore was freed on 22 September 2014, after $USD1.6 million dollars ransom was paid, and following 977 days of captivity.

In January 2012, Jessica Buchanan and Poul Hagen Thisted had been held captive approximately twelve miles north of the Somali town of Adado, Galguduud since the previous October. Their captors had been seeking a ransom. On 25 January 2012, U.S. Navy SEALs parachuted from a Lockheed C-130 Hercules, attacked the compound, killed all nine pirates holding them, and rescued both aid workers.

==== 2013 and decline ====
On 11 October, pirates attacked Hong Kong registered tanker Island Splendor and attacked a Spanish fishing vessel three days later. Suspected to have been carried out by the same group of pirates, they were tracked down by RFA Fort Victoria, supported by HMAS Melbourne, ROKS Wang Geon, European Union flagship HNLMS Johan de Witt, and a Seychelles-based maritime patrol aircraft from Luxembourg. The pirate skiffs were tracked by Melbourne's Seahawk helicopter; a boarding team from Melbourne searched the skiffs, they successfully apprehended nine pirates and later destroyed two skiffs and their equipment.

By December 2013, the US Office of Naval Intelligence reported that only nine vessels had been attacked during the year by the pirates, with no successful hijackings. Control Risks attributed this 90% decline in pirate activity during the corresponding period in 2012 to the adoption of best management practices by vessel owners and crews, armed private security on board ships, a significant naval presence, and the development of onshore security forces.

With the increase in illegal fishing off Somalia after the 2013 decline in piracy, fishing vessels became targets in a few incidents in 2015. In March two Iranian vessels and in November one Iranian and a Thai vessel were attacked.

==== 2015 ====
In 2015, a report by the Spanish Office of the Chief of Staff of the Navy stated that the EU Operation Atalanta had been a "success" and that the "periodic reports prepared by intelligence units and sent to the Navy Staff reflect the "practical eradication of suspicious activity" in these waters." After a small rebound in 2017, the European Union has periodically extended Operation Atalanta, and the official position has been that "piracy in Somalia is contained, but not eradicated".

==== 2017 ====
The tanker Aris 13, which had been carrying fuel from Djibouti to Mogadishu, was hijacked off the coast of Somalia on 13 March 2017. This was the first reported hijacking of a large commercial vessel in five years. Two skiffs approached the tanker and boarded the vessel off the northern coast of Somalia. Eight Sri Lankan crew members were aboard at the time. After being captured, Aris 13 was taken to Alula and anchored there before its release without ransom was confirmed by security officials on 16 March 2017.

In 2017, it was revealed that the Islamic State – Somalia Province works closely with Somali pirates, namely Mohamed Garfanje's Hobyo-Haradhere Piracy Network and another unidentified group that is based in Qandala. These pirates do, however, also supply ISS' rival in Puntland, al-Shabaab, with weapons and other materials.

==== 2023 ====
In January 2023, the "Indian Ocean High Risk Area" was removed, following no reported attacks by Somali pirates for several years. Piracy resurged in the region during the early 2020s, with incidents of piracy and hijacking in the Somali basin continuing to increase.

In November 2023, amid the Gaza war, the crew of the USS Mason (DDG-87) thwarted a suspected Somali pirate attack on the Central Park, a Liberian-flagged tanker ship owned by Zodiac Maritime, which is owned by an Israeli.

==== 2024 ====
In the beginning of 2024, piracy seemed to have had a rebound in the region. In March 2024, MV Abdullah was hijacked by pirates and the crew taken hostage. The increase has been attributed to a change of focus, from the Gulf of Aden to the Red Sea, according to the Maritime Policy Initiative at the Observer Research Foundation, a New Delhi think tank.

MV Lila Norfolk, flagged in Liberia, was captured on 5 January. It was successfully recaptured by the Indian navy.

Pirates armed with Kalashnikov-style rifles and rocket-propelled grenades fired upon the Marshall Islands-flagged Chrystal Arctic in an attempted hijacking as it voyaged through the Gulf of Aden on 10 May but subsequently retreated after the vessel's security team returned fire. The vessel continued its voyage with all of its crew members safe. Six suspected Somali pirates were later located and detained by EUNAVFOR naval forces, as part of Operation Atalanta.

In November, Liberian-flagged Central Park was captured off the Yemeni Coast and was recaptured by the United States navy.

The Conversation argue that, in 2024, the risk of piracy off the Somali Coast remains an undertaking of high-risk and low reward, given botched attacks and failed ransoms attempts from 2017–2023. Even if specific ransom demand succeeds, the overall conclusion is not altered. Christian Bueger (expert in maritime security, global ocean politics and critical infrastructure) argues that a new surge of piracy incidents is likely. From an institutional and legal perspective, large gaps have appeared that could encourage the return of the Somali pirates. The Resolution on Somalia: Anti-Piracy, a UN Security Council mandate, expired in March 2022 with no follow-up. Regional institutions, such as Mase (operated by the Indian Ocean Commission), lack strong links to the international community and do not have the diplomatic or operational capability to respond to a resurgence of piracy. International bodies, such as the Contact Group on Piracy off the Coast of Somalia, have seen a steady decline in participation. Furthermore, increased activities by the Houthis serve to divert political and naval attention.

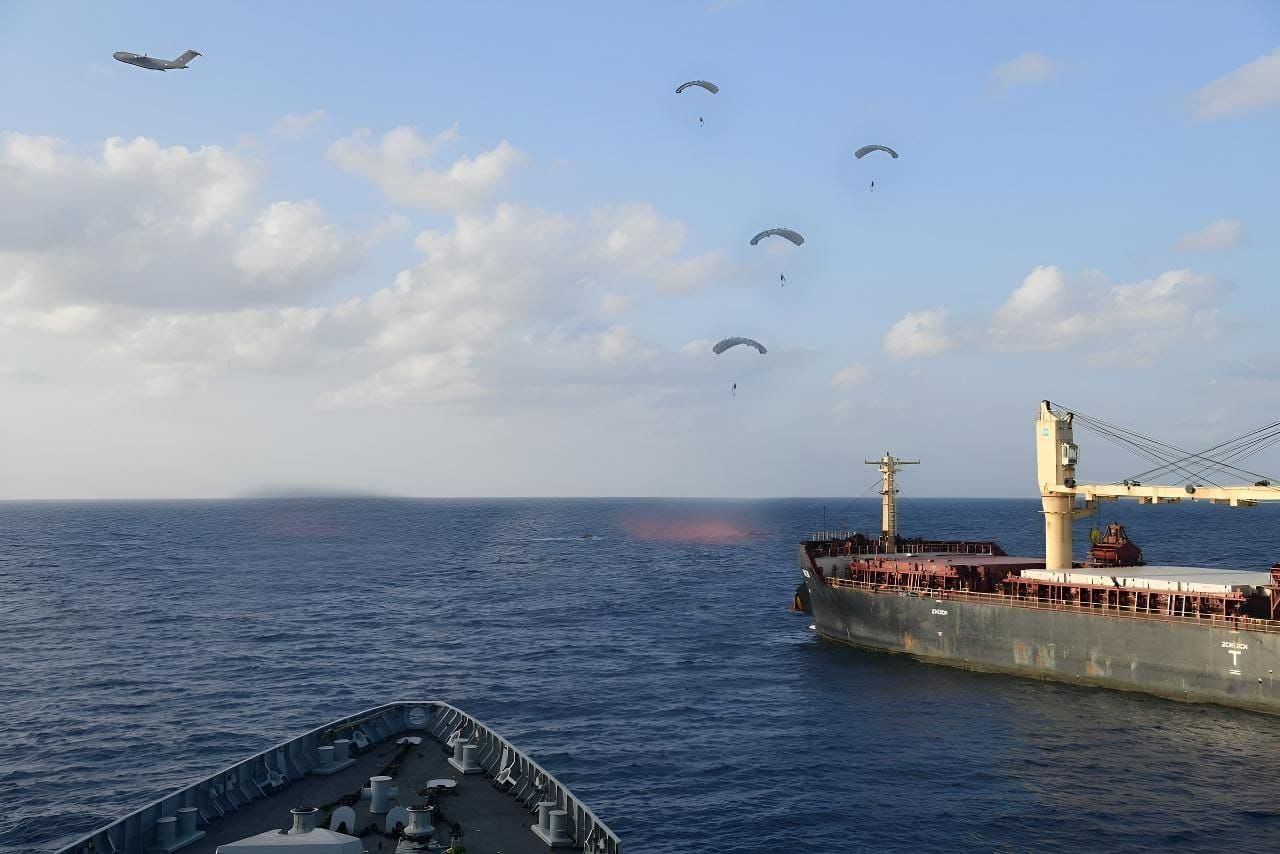
MARCOS commando units of the Indian Navy intervening on a pirate-flagged vessel as a part of Operation Sankalp

The Indian Navy has now emerged as an important player in the western Indian Ocean and has repeatedly carried out operations against pirates. In March 2024, 35 Somali pirates captured from the hijacked bulk carrier MV Reun were sent to Mumbai to be tried. The Indian Navy had carried out a major long-range operation to free the ship.

==== 2025 ====
Somali pirate activity in 2025 does not signal a broader resurgence of piracy. But the rise of new criminal networks and creation of opportunity gaps serve as fertile soil for piracy’s return. Soldiers in Puntland have their attention drawn on supporting a coup in Somaliland while fending off branches of militant groups like the Al-Shabaab and the Islamic State, on top with managing a tense election cycle that concluded in 2024.

In September 2025, Puntland authorities seized several fishing vessels accused of illegal fishing. Many pirate groups responded, claiming that their actions are justified to protect their humble livelihoods, given limited fishing opportunities. As the practice is on the rise, locals fault the government for distributing more licences while not increasing enforcement of regulations to ensure government regulations are complied with.

There is a growing relationship between the al-Shabaab and Houthis. The former has pledged to escalate piracy off Somalia in exchange for more advanced weapons and training. The United Nations reported physical meetings occurring between the two militant groups in February 2025. Al-Shabaab is speculated to be exploiting the political and naval diversion of major naval powers, to broker deals for ransom proceeds and loot cuts in exchange for protection.

On 3 November 2025, the Cayman Islands-flagged chemical tanker Stolt Sagaland was attacked near the coast of Mogadishu. The armed attackers were repelled, with no injuries to crew, nor damage to the ship. Three days later, Maltese-flagged tanker Hellas Aphrodite was boarded by pirates off the Somali coast, while carrying a cargo of petrol from India to South Africa, after attacking with machine guns and rocket-propelled grenades. The following day, Spanish warship, ESPS Victoria, operating under EU anti-piracy mission Operation Atalanta, arrived, prompting the pirates to abandon ship, and rescued the 24 crew unharmed.

==== 2026 ====
On 22 April 2026, the oil tanker Honour 25 was hijacked by pirates off the Somali coast, about 30 nautical miles offshore. The ship, carrying 17 crew members of mixed nationalities and around 18,500 barrels of oil, was later anchored near the Puntland coast between Xaafun and Bander Beyla. It had sailed from Berbera and previously operated near the Strait of Hormuz before heading toward Mogadishu. Reports said more armed men joined the hijackers after the takeover. As of 27 August 2026, around 67 crew members belonging to 4 ships are currently in the capture of pirates.

25 September, Puntland Maritime Police Force freed the oil tanker Sibu 1 after a multi-day counter-piracy operation near Garacad, Mudug, Puntland. Somali pirates had seized the vessel in August. 29 September, The PMPF freed another hijacked oil tanker, MT Honour 25, near Bayla, Karkaar, Puntland. Pirates had seized it on 21 April, about 30 nautical miles off Puntland's coast, while it was carrying 17 crew members. Before the rescue, the pirates killed five crew members and injured four others. The dead were three Pakistani citizens, one Indian and one Myanmar national. It was the first time in over a decade that pirates had killed hostages. Following a coordinated military push by the Puntland Maritime Police Force, the pirates abandoned the ship and fled inland. The entire crew including eight Egyptian sailors and several Indian nationals was safely rescued, while the PMPF was conducting a week-long counter-piracy operation, a fourth ship was shifting toward southern Somalia coastal area between Harardhere and Warsheikh.

== Pirates ==
=== Profile ===
Most Somali pirates are young. An official list issued in 2010 by the Somali government of 40 apprehended pirate suspects noted that 80% (32/40) were born in Somalia's southern conflict zones, while only 20% (8/40) came from the more stable northern regions. As of 2012, the pirates primarily operated from the Galmudug region in the central section of the country. In previous years, they largely ventured to sea from ports located in the northeastern province of Puntland until the regional administration launched a major anti-piracy campaign and operation and established a maritime police force (PMPF).

According to a 2008 BBC report, the pirates can be divided into three main categories:

- Local fishermen, considered the brains of the pirates' operations due to their skill and knowledge of the sea.
- Ex-militiamen, who previously fought for the local clan warlords, or ex-military from the former Barre government used as the muscle.
- Technical experts, who operate equipment such as GPS devices.

The closest Somali term for 'pirate' is burcad badeed, which means "ocean robber". However, the pirates themselves prefer to be called badaadinta badah or "saviours of the sea" (often translated as "coast guard").

=== Methodology ===
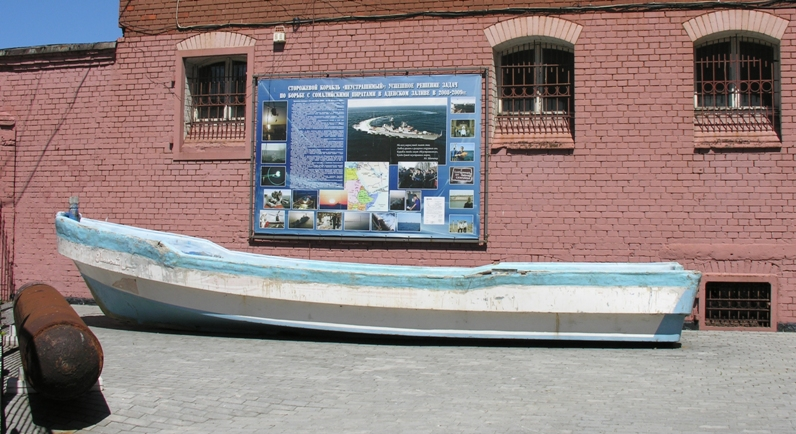
A pirate skiff in Baltiysk, Russia — captured by the Russian Navy

The methods used in a typical pirate attack have been analyzed. They show that while attacks can be expected at any time, most occur during the day, often in the early hours. They may involve two or more skiffs that can reach speeds of up to 25 knots. With the help of motherships that include captured fishing and merchant vessels, the operating range of the skiffs has been increased far into the Indian Ocean. An attacked vessel is approached from quarter or stern; RPGs and small arms are used to intimidate the operator to slow down and allow boarding. Light ladders are brought along to climb aboard. Pirates then will try to get control of the bridge to take operational control of the vessel. When pirates take control of the bridge, they do not seek to steal from the ship or to impose violence on any of the crew. Instead, they attempt to get into communications with the ship's bank via radio and telephone. Once they have reached communications with the bank, they hand the operation over to their negotiator, who is on land somewhere in or around Somalia. The negotiator often has a strong command of the English language and an understanding of finance. It is their job to win a large amount of ransom money for the pirates from the ship's bank. While these negotiations go on, the pirates hold the crew hostage, maintaining as much order as possible. Oftentimes, these negotiations can take multiple hours and even several days. Once an agreement is reached between the negotiator and the ship's bank, a helicopter hovers over the ship and drops a package full of cash onto the ship's deck. When the pirates have retrieved their ransom money, they call back their mother ship to come pick them up. Once picked up from the ship, they flee the scene as quickly as possible, returning to the shores of Somalia.

According to Sky News, pirates often jettison their equipment in the sea before arrest, as this lowers the likelihood of a successful prosecution.

The weather serves as an important determinant of piracy activity. The southwest and northeast monsoons serve as a deterrent as stronger winds and rougher seas make close approaches using skiffs more difficult for the Somali pirates. Piracy is expected to temper in the months from late November to early February.

=== Weaponry and funding ===
The pirates obtain most of their weapons from Yemen, but a significant number are sourced from Mogadishu, Somalia's capital. Weapons dealers in the capital receive a deposit from a hawala dealer on behalf of the pirates and the weapons are then driven to Puntland, where the pirates pay the balance. Various photographs of pirates in situ indicate that their weapons are predominantly AK-47, AKM, Type 56, RPK, PKM, RPG-7, and Tokarev pistols. Additionally, given the particular origin of their weaponry, they are likely to have hand grenades such as the RGD-5 or F1.

The funding of piracy operations is now structured in a stock exchange, with investors buying and selling shares in upcoming attacks in a bourse in Harardhere. Pirates say ransom money is paid in large-denomination US dollar bills. It is delivered to them in burlap sacks, which are either dropped from helicopters or cased in waterproof suitcases loaded onto tiny skiffs. To authenticate the banknotes, pirates use currency-counting machines, the same technology used at foreign exchange bureaus worldwide. According to one pirate, these machines are, in turn, purchased from business connections in Dubai, Djibouti, and other areas. Hostages seized by the pirates usually have to wait 45 days or more for the ships' owners to pay the ransom and secure their release.

In 2008, there were also allegations that the pirates received assistance from some members of the Somali diaspora. Somali expatriates, including some members of the Somali community in Canada, reportedly offered funds, equipment and information.

According to the head of the UN's counter-piracy division, Colonel John Steed, the Al-Shabaab group in 2011 increasingly sought to cooperate with the pirate gangs in the face of dwindling funds and resources for their own activities. Steed, however, acknowledged that he had no definite proof of operational ties between the pirates and the Islamist militants. Detained pirates also indicated to UNODC officials that some measure of cooperation with Al-Shabaab militants was necessary, as they have increasingly launched maritime raids from areas in southern Somalia controlled by the insurgent outfit. Al-Shabaab members have also extorted the pirates, demanding protection money from them and forcing seized pirate gang leaders in Harardhere to hand over 20% of future ransom proceeds. It has been suggested that al-Qaeda have received funding from pirate operations. A maritime intelligence source told CBS News that it was "'inconceivable' to Western intelligence agencies that al Qaeda would not be getting some financial reward from the successful hijackings". They go on to express concern about this funding link being able to keep the group satisfied, as piracy gains more publicity and higher ransoms.

By 2025, new pirates have emerged with satellite phones and heavy weapons, based on evidence of increased arms sales between the al-Shabaab and Houthis. The fundamental Somali piracy model remains unchanged. They still lack onshore abilities to offload cargo held by maritime vessels, preferring to capture crew for ransom.

=== List ===
This is a list of Somali pirates, including those associated with local sea robber gangs, privateer-like freelance groups affiliated with armed private militias and Islamist militant groups, alongside Red Sea and Indian Ocean pirates and others involved in piracy off the coast of Somalia. This list includes both captains and prominent crew members.

Name	Life	Years active	Notes	Ref
Mohamed Abdi Hassan		2005–2016	Pirate kingpin and leader of most powerful pirate organizations, the Hobyo-Harardheere network (Salebaan clan).	
Isse Mohamoud Yusuf	1966	2006–2015	alias Somali: Ciise Yulux used to lead the Somali Piracy Network, but publicly renounced piracy in 2015.	
Abshir Boyah	1968	2000–2010	Imprisoned by Puntland in 2010	
Asad 'Booyah' Abdulahi	1966–	1998–	Somali pirate boss, active in capturing ships in the Gulf of Aden and Indian Ocean for ransoms.	
Bileh		2000s	Pirate spokesperson	
Mohamed Aden Tiiceey	1972	2000–2015	Pirate collaborator and former President of Himan and Heeb	
Mohamed Garfanje		2000s	Pirate kingpin, assisted al-Shabaab/ISIS in smuggling weapons and ammunition into Somalia.	
Abdul Hassan	1969–	2005–	Somali pirate nicknamed "the one who never sleeps". Leader of the 350-men strong group "Central Regional Coast Guard", active in capturing ships for ransoms.	
Abduwali Muse	1990–	2008–2009	Sole survivor of four pirates who hijacked the MV Maersk Alabama in April 2009 and then held Captain Richard Phillips for ransom. On 16 February 2011, Muse was convicted and sentenced to 33 years and 9 months in U.S. federal prison. Muse was portrayed by Somali-American actor Barkhad Abdi in the 2013 film Captain Phillips, a dramatization of the hijacking.	
Isse Mohamoud Yusuf	1966–	2006–2015	Operated in the Alula district before renouncing piracy in 2015. He is believed to still be operating militias in the region, trading in fuel and arms for the benefit of ISIS-Somalia. He has been sanctioned by the United States.	

== Root causes ==
A combination of root causes can be attributed to the pervasive presence of piracy off the coast of Somalia including; geography, weak law enforcement and corruption as well as economic factors. Most of these drivers display considerable overlap just like they can be viewed as derivative effects of land based problems. The following section breaks down some of the identified root causes for the pervasiveness of piracy in the region.

=== Geography ===
One of the most vital shipping routes of the world takes international trade across the Western Indian Ocean through the Bab el-Mandeb strait connecting the Red Sea with the Gulf of Aden making it the perfect strategic place for pirates to operate. Generally, pirate activities thrive in areas with high value maritime traffic. Thus, geography plays a significant role in making the coast of Somalia a lucrative place for pirates to hijack vessels.

In this context, the Gulf of Aden is one of the most lucrative places for piracy in the world, because of its close proximity to the main merchant shipping route. More than 20% of global trade passes through the Gulf of Aden. The region is characterized by a diverse geography including one of the world's most important maritime chokepoints, the Bab-el Mandeb strait as well as wide-open ocean off the coast of Somalia. The area had earlier been designated as a high risk area in 2010 during the peak of pirate attacks but this designation was removed again from 2023 as the level of attacks declined.

=== Economic factors ===
Given that the piracy in the area is a fundamentally profit-driven activity, economic factors also play a huge role in explaining the root causes. This is due to myriad factors such as: socioeconomic, unemployment, a lack of viable economic alternatives to piracy, overfishing and illegal fishing practices, as well as the emission of toxic waste by foreign companies, causing the fishing industry as a source of income to crumble. In general, the economy of Somalia is classified as the least developed country, being dependent on agriculture and livestock, which is challenged by the harsh climate and poor soil. Furthermore, as a result of civil unrest, the Somali economy has been destroyed.

Piracy is often linked to insecurity on land and caused by lack of other opportunities to make a living. This has also been the case in Somalia, where, especially, incomes from fishing have drastically declined. Therefore, piracy creates an alternative economic opportunity to improve the living conditions due to the possibility of striking a good ransom deal. In essence, elements of poverty, lack of education and unemployment are viewed as main drivers. The combination of high unemployment and the decline in the possibility of making a living from fishing creates the incentives to make a profit from piracy, which is often associated with large sums of money. In a country where poverty is rampant, piracy offers an alternative way to make a living, which attracts young Somali men.

=== Weak law enforcement and corruption ===
Somalia was ranked the most corrupt country in the world in 2023. Corrupt actors can help facilitate the piracy activities by turning a blind eye to or providing means for the pirates to operate and thereby also taking share in the multimillion-dollar business. This occurs as a result of Somalia being a failed state leading to weak law enforcement and an ineffective government. The access to information regarding the level of security on board the vessels, as well as the general ship information, is of high value to the pirates making bribery of port and government officials essential. Furthermore, according to Bueger & Edmunds, studies of piracy operations in Somalia show that laundering of profits, protection from other criminals and supplying and recruitment are among the elements pirates depend on. The weak law enforcement occurs as a result of the last decades of instability and civil unrest. Moreover, the general lawlessness that has pervaded the region can be seen as a result of the absence of a central authority. The inability to control the maritime territory and perform security tasks left the 3,330 km coastline of Somalia unpatrolled, giving rise to several forms of blue crimes. Furthermore, the lack of patrolling and thereby control over the Somali territorial waters enabled the illegal fishing and plundering of Somali fish stocks by foreign fishing ships. The insufficient and absent response from the authorities to both illegal fishing by foreign ships and the dumping of toxic waste forced the Somali fishermen to take up arms against the foreign ships. From here piracy evolved from charging smaller amounts from illegal trawlers as a way of concealing their illegal activities to more extensive piracy including hostage taking.

=== Cultural acceptability and legitimation ===
The continuation of the actions from the local coastal communities and fishermen against the illegal fishing by foreign fishers, the element of cultural acceptability, and legitimation also plays a significant role. In 2009, the UN estimated that $300 million worth of seafood from Somalia is illegally fished by foreign actors each year. The cultural acceptability of piracy in Somali coastal communities stems from the perception of the actions taken against the external actors in the Somali water as legitimate. Since the illegal fishing and pollution crimes by foreign ships has increased the economic hardship and destroyed the livelihood of fishermen, this justifies the actions against the foreign ships committed by the local fishermen.

While grievances over illegal fishing and poverty might have caused the emergence of Somali piracy, piracy is, today, a highly organised enterprise led by wealthy and powerful individuals. Some businessmen provide necessities (like fuel and food) to the pirates, with the expectation that they will be compensated after a successful ransom attempt.

Omar Mahmood, Senior Analyst of Crisis Group asserts that, in 2024, many countries like Iran, India, Pakistan and Thailand, remain disrespectful of the Somali government’s regulations pertaining to trawling. While locals remain distasteful of piracy, there is a strong sentiment that foreign navies and the government are the cause of piracy.

Initially, piracy drew much of the locals' support. Many perceived piracy as serving the community as they fought against foreign ship intrusions, thereby protecting livelihoods. However, the pirate’s pursuit of financial gain and hedonistic lifestyles was disapproved by the local community, especially those with religious beliefs, such as the devout Muslim mores in Eyl. The locals were critical of the pirates who used their relative wealth to marry young women and quickly divorced them. The greater their profits, the more disrespectful of the masses they became. Community leaders are concerned that young boys are looking up to such deviant behaviours and question the point of education, given the profits that could be made through piracy.

Some religious leaders have asserted that piracy was haram (which means it is forbidden by Islam). A former Puntland leader has also tapped on clan elders to convince their members to not permit the marriage of their daughters to pirates. Such measures have proven effective in deterring pirates in Eyl. However, the pirates did not disband but instead relocated to other coastal regions such as the Mudug region.

== Effects and perceptions ==
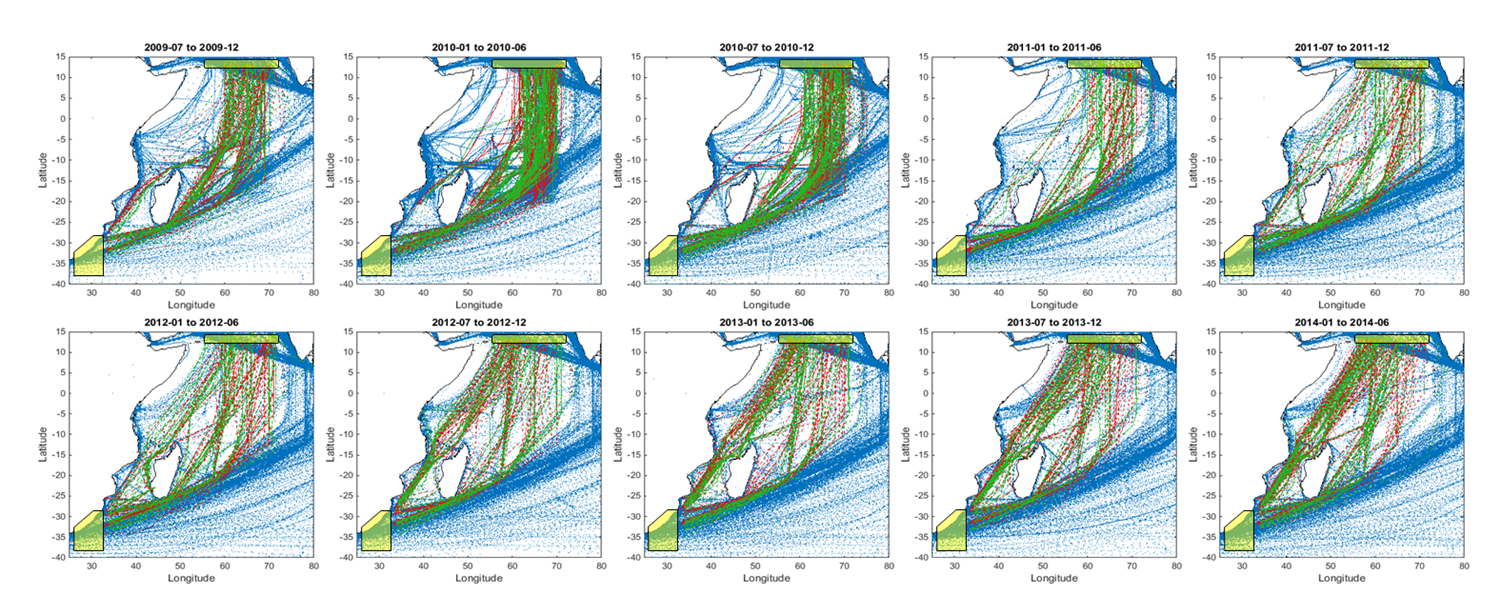
Time series of maritime traffic crossing the Indian Ocean showing the effect of piracy and its progressive decline in re-routing ships. Each sub-plot shows 6-month colour-coded trips, red southbound and green northbound, using Long Range Identification and Tracking (LRIT) historical data. Operational authorities requested an increase of LRIT reporting frequency from ships in 2009 and 2010 in order to better track them remotely in the High Risk Area. The increase of tracking points can be erroneously perceived as an apparently higher volume of traffic with respect to other periods.

=== Costs ===
Significant negative effects of piracy have been reported. In 2005, a liquefied petroleum tanker, MS Feisty Gas, was hijacked and ransomed for $315,000 after being held for about two weeks. In 2009, pirate income derived from ransoms was estimated at 42.1 million euros (about $58 million), rising to $238 million in 2010. The average ransom had risen to $5.4 million in 2010, up from around $150,000 in 2005. However, by 2011, pirate ransom income dropped to $160 million, a downward trend that has been attributed to intensified counter-piracy efforts.

Besides the actual cost of paying ransoms, various attempts have been made at gauging indirect costs stemming from the piracy; especially those reportedly incurred over the course of anti-piracy initiatives.

During the height of the piracy phenomenon in 2008, local residents complained that the presence of so many armed men made them feel insecure and that their free spending ways caused wild fluctuations in the local exchange rate. Others faulted them for excessive consumption of alcoholic beverages and khat.

A 2010 report suggested that piracy off the coast of Somalia led to a decrease of revenue for Egypt as fewer ships use the Suez Canal (estimated loss of about $642 million), impeded trade with neighboring countries, and negatively impacted tourism and fishing in the Seychelles. According to Sky News, around 50% of the world's containers passed through the Horn of Africa coastline as of 2012. The European Union Naval Force (EU NAVFOR) has a yearly budget of over 8 million Euros earmarked for patrolling the 8.3 million square kilometres (3,200,000 square miles).

A 2011 report by Oceans Beyond Piracy (OBP) suggested that the indirect costs of piracy were much higher and estimated to be between $6.6 to $6.9 billion, as they also included insurance, naval support, legal proceedings, re-routing of slower ships, and individual protective steps taken by ship-owners.

Another report from 2011 published by the consultancy firm Geopolicity Inc. investigated the causes and consequences of international piracy, with a particular focus on such activity off the coast of Somalia. The paper asserted that what began as an attempt in the mid-1990s by Somali fishermen to protect their territorial waters has extended far beyond their seaboard and grown into an emerging market in its own right. Due to potentially substantial financial rewards, the report hypothesized that the number of new pirates could swell by 400 persons annually, that pirate ransom income could in turn rise to $400 million per year by 2015, and that piracy costs as a whole could increase to $15 billion over the same period.

In 2011 alone, it has been estimated that MAERSK, the world's largest shipping company, incurred costs upwards of $200 million. To help combat this, the company introduced a 'piracy risk surcharge', ranging from $110–$170 per 40 ft equivalent unit.

According to a 2012 investigative piece by the Somalia Report, the OBP paper and other similar reports that attempt to calibrate the global cost of piracy produce inaccurate estimates based on a variety of factors. Most saliently, instead of comparing the actual costs of piracy with the considerable benefits derived from the phenomenon by the maritime industry and local parties capitalizing on capacity-building initiatives, the OBP paper conflated the alleged piracy costs with the large premiums made by insurance companies and lumped them together with governmental and societal costs. The report also exaggerated the impact that piracy has had on the shipping sector, an industry that has grown steadily in size from 25,000 billion tonnes/miles to 35,000 billion tonnes/miles since the rise of Indian Ocean piracy in 2005. Moreover, the global costs of piracy reportedly represent a small fraction of total maritime shipping expenses and are significantly lower than more routine costs, such as those brought on by port theft, bad weather conditions or fuel-related issues. In the United States alone, the National Cargo Security Council estimated that between $10–$15 billion were stolen from ports in 2003, a figure several times higher than the projected global cost of piracy. Additionally, while the OBP paper alleged that pirate activity has had a significantly negative impact on regional economies, particularly the Kenyan tourism industry, tourist-derived revenue in Kenya rose by 32% in 2011. According to the Somalia Report investigation, the OBP paper also did not factor into its calculations the overall decline in successful pirate attacks beginning in the second half of 2011, a downward trend largely brought about by the increasing use of armed guards. According to Admiral Terence E. McKnight, ransom demands and payments have risen exponentially and the financers and pirates decided they are willing to wait as long as it takes to receive "high seven-figure payouts".

=== Benefits ===
Some benefits from the piracy have also been noted. In the earlier years of the phenomenon in 2008, it was reported that some local residents in pirate hubs such as Harardhere appreciated the rejuvenating effect that the pirates' on-shore spending and restocking had on their small towns, a presence that often provided jobs and opportunity when there were comparatively fewer. Entire hamlets were in the process reportedly transformed into boomtowns, with local shop owners and other residents using their gains to purchase items such as generators for uninterrupted electricity. However, the election of a new administration in 2009 in the northeastern Puntland region saw a sharp decrease in pirate operations, as the provincial authorities launched a comprehensive anti-piracy campaign and established an official maritime police force (PMPF). Since 2010, pirates have mainly operated from the Galmudug region to the south. According to the Somalia Report, the significant infrastructural development evident in Puntland's urban centers has also mainly come from a combination of government development programs, internal investment by local residents returning to their home regions following the civil war in the south, and especially remittance funds sent by the sizable Somali diaspora. The latter contributions have been estimated at $1.3–$2 billion a year, exponentially dwarfing pirate ransom proceeds, which total only a few million dollars annually and are difficult to track in terms of spending.

Additionally, impoverished fishermen in Kenya's Malindi area in the southeastern African Great Lakes region have reported their largest catches in 40 years, catching hundreds of kilos of fish and earning 50 times the average daily wage as a result. They attribute the recent abundance and variety of marine stock to the pirates scaring away foreign fishing trawlers, which have for decades deprived local dhows of a livelihood. According to marine biologists, indicators are that the local fishery is recovering because of the lack of commercial-scale fishing.

Piracy off the coast of Somalia also appears to have a positive impact on the problem of overfishing in Somali waters by foreign vessels. A comparison has been made with the situation in Tanzania further to the south, which is also affected by fishing by foreign ships and generally lacks the means to effectively protect and regulate its territorial waters. There, catches have dropped to dramatically low levels, whereas in Somalia they have risen back to more acceptable levels since before the beginning of the piracy.

=== Casualties ===
Of the 4,185 seafarers whose ships had been attacked by the pirates and the 1,090 who were held hostage in 2010, a third were reportedly abused. Some captives have also indicated that they were used as human shields for pirate attacks while being held hostage.

According to Reuters, of the 3,500 captured during a four-year period, 62 died. The causes of death included suicide and malnutrition, with 25 of the deaths attributed to murder according to Intercargo. In some cases, the captives have also reported being tortured. Multiple seafarers are left traumatized after release.

According to multiple interviewed maritime security firms, ship owner groups, lawyers and insurance companies, fear of pirate attacks has increased the likelihood of violent encounters at sea, as untrained or overeager vessel guards have resorted to shooting indiscriminately without first properly assessing the actual threat level. In the process, they have killed both pirates and sometimes innocent fishermen, as well as jeopardizing the reputation of private maritime security firms with their reckless gun use. Since some of the new maritime security companies that have emerged often also enlist the services of off-duty policemen and former soldiers who saw combat in Iraq and Afghanistan, worries of a "Blackwater out in the Indian Ocean" have only intensified.

=== Profiteers ===
According to the German Institute for Economic Research (DIW), a veritable industry of profiteers has also risen around the piracy. Insurance companies, in particular, have profited from the pirate attacks, as insurance premiums have increased significantly. DIW reports that, in order to keep premiums high, insurance firms have not demanded that ship owners take security precautions that would make hijackings more difficult. For their part, shipping companies often ignore naval guidelines on how best to prevent pirate attacks in order to cut down on costs. In addition, security contractors and the arms industry have profited from the phenomenon.

When a successful hijacking occurs, regional brokers who serve as intermediaries between the pirates and the shipping and insurance companies will emerge to serve as negotiators on the pirate’s behalf.

The Global Initiative against Transnational Organised Crime, through their publication Fishy Business: Illegal fishing in Somalia and the capture of state institutions, reveals a network of actors that allegedly financially benefits from the distribution of permits. These actors include key Somali officials (who benefit from bribes), local clans and families, foreign actors and private entities.

== Sovereignty and environmental protection ==
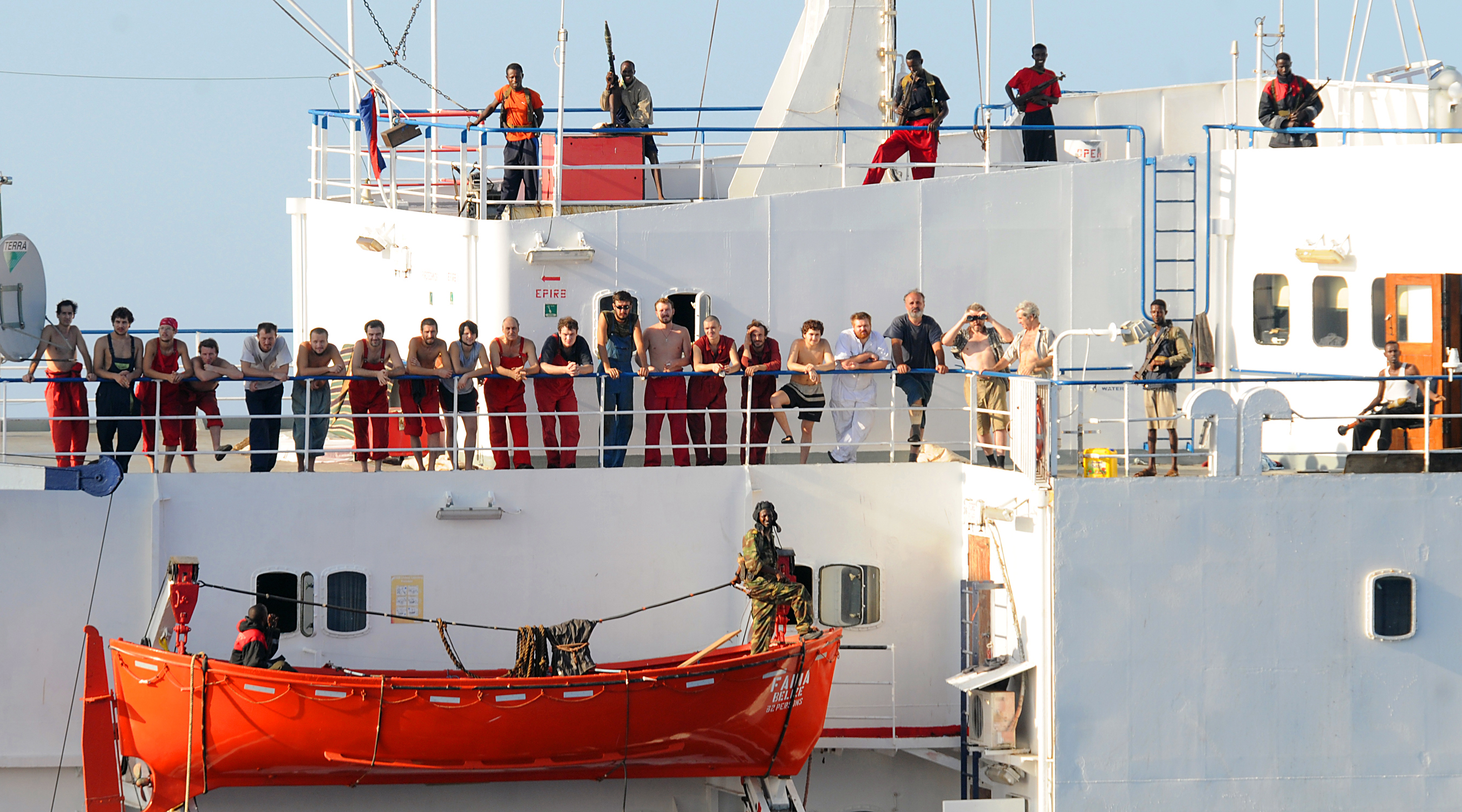
The crew of the merchant vessel Faina stand on the deck after a U.S. Navy request to check on their health and welfare. The Belize-flagged cargo ship owned and operated by Kaalbye Shipping, Ukraine, was seized by pirates 25 September 2008 and forced to proceed to anchorage off the Somali coast. The ship was carrying a cargo of Ukrainian T-72 tanks and related military equipment.

The former UN envoy for Somalia, Ahmedou Ould-Abdallah, has stated that "because there is no (effective) government, there is ... much irregular fishing from European and Asian countries," and that the UN has reliable information that European and Asian companies are dumping toxic and nuclear waste off the Somali coastline. However, he stresses that "no government has endorsed this act, and that private companies and individuals acting alone are responsible". In addition, Ould-Abdallah told the press that he approached several international NGOs, such as Global Witness, to trace the illicit fishing and waste-dumping. He added that he believes the toxic waste dumping is "a disaster off the Somali coast, a disaster (for) the Somali environment, the Somali population", and that what he terms "this illegal fishing, illegal dumping of waste" helps fuel the civil war in Somalia since the illegal foreign fishermen pay off corrupt local officials or warlords for protection or to secure counterfeit licenses. Ould-Abdallah noted that piracy will not prevent waste dumping:

I am convinced there is dumping of solid waste, chemicals and probably nuclear (waste).... There is no government (control) and there are few people with high moral ground[...] The intentions of these pirates are not concerned with protecting their environment. What is ultimately needed is a functioning, effective government that will get its act together and take control of its affairs.

— Ahmedou Ould-Abdallah, the UN envoy for Somalia

Somali pirates that captured MV Faina, a Ukrainian ship carrying tanks and military hardware, accused European firms of dumping toxic waste off the Somali coast and declared that the $8m ransom for the return of the ship will go towards cleaning up the waste. The ransom demand is a means of "reacting to the toxic waste that has been continually dumped on the shores of our country for nearly 20 years", Januna Ali Jama, a spokesman for the pirates said. "The Somali coastline has been destroyed, and we believe this money is nothing compared to the devastation that we have seen on the seas."

Former African Union chairman and Libyan president Muammar al-Gaddafi argued that piracy; "[is] a response to greedy Western nations, who invade and exploit Somalia's water resources illegally...[it] is not a piracy, it is self defence."

Pirate leader Sugule Ali said their motive was "to stop illegal fishing and dumping in our waters ... We don't consider ourselves sea bandits. We consider sea bandits [to be] those who illegally fish and dump in our seas and dump waste in our seas and carry weapons in our seas." According to Johann Hari, the independent Somali news-site WardherNews found that 70 percent "strongly supported the piracy as a form of national defence of the country's territorial waters".

Continued frustration over perceived illegal fishing by foreign ships generates local Somali resentment, which could strengthen the networks pirates use for anchorage, logistics and intelligence. In 2024, the Puntland Maritime Police Force, tasked with protecting its coastal waters, released a foreign vessel that had intruded into its jurisdiction. However, officials in Garowe later authorised the release of the Iranian crew, signalling that they did not wish to antagonise such a powerful external actor. Such incidents deprive the locals of hope that the government is capable of stemming foreign trawling. Omar Mahmood, Senior Analyst of Crisis Group calls a warning from the Federal Ministry of Fisheries and Blue Economy against Trawling a good start to gain political legitimacy.

=== Waste dumping ===
Following the Indian Ocean tsunami of December 2004, allegations have emerged that after the outbreak of the Somali Civil War in late 1991, Somalia's long, remote shoreline was used as a dump site for the disposal of toxic waste. The huge waves that battered northern Somalia after the tsunami are believed to have stirred up tonnes of nuclear and toxic waste that was illegally dumped in Somali waters by several European firms – front companies created by the Italian mafia. The European Green Party followed up these revelations by presenting before the press and the European Parliament in Strasbourg copies of contracts signed by two European companies—the Italian Swiss firm, Achair Partners, and an Italian waste broker, Progresso—and representatives of the warlords then in power, to accept 10 million tonnes of toxic waste in exchange for $80 million (then about £60 million). According to a report by the United Nations Environment Programme (UNEP) assessment mission, there are far higher than normal cases of respiratory infections, mouth ulcers and bleeding, abdominal hemorrhages and unusual skin infections among a number of inhabitants of the areas around the northeastern towns of Hobbio and Benadir on the Indian Ocean coast. UNEP continues that the current situation along the Somali coastline poses a serious environmental hazard not only in Somalia but also in the eastern Africa sub-region.

In 1992, reports ran in the European press of "unnamed European firms" contracting with local warlords to dump toxic waste both in Somalia and off Somalia's shores. The United Nations Environment Program was called in to investigate, and the Italian parliament issued a report later in the decade. Several European "firms" — really front companies created by the Italian mafia — contracted with local Somali warlords to ship hundreds of thousands of tons of toxic industrial waste from Europe to Somalia.

— Troy S. Thomas, Warlords rising: confronting violent non-state actors

Under Article 9(1)(d) of the Basel Convention on the Control of Transboundary Movements of Hazardous Wastes and Their Disposal, it is illegal for "any transboundary movement of hazardous wastes or other wastes: that results in deliberate disposal (e.g. dumping) of hazardous wastes or other wastes in contravention of this Convention and of general principles of international law".

According to Nick Nuttall of the United Nations Environmental Programme, "Somalia has been used as a dumping ground for hazardous waste starting in the early 1990s, and continuing through the civil war there", and "European companies found it to be very cheap to get rid of the waste, costing as little as $2.50 a tonne, where waste disposal costs in Europe are closer to $1000 per tonne."

=== Illegal fishing ===
At the same time, foreign trawlers began illegally fishing Somalia's seas, with an estimated $300 million of tuna, shrimp, and lobster being taken each year, depleting stocks previously available to local fishermen. Through interception with speedboats, Somali fishermen tried to either dissuade the dumpers and trawlers or levy a "tax" on them as compensation, as Segule Ali's previously mentioned quote notes. Peter Lehr, a Somalia piracy expert at the University of St. Andrews, says "It's almost like a resource swap", Somalis collect up to $100 million a year from pirate ransoms off their coasts and the Europeans and Asians poach around $300 million a year in fish from Somali waters. The UK's Department for International Development (DFID) issued a report in 2005 stating that, between 2003 and 2004, Somalia lost about $100 million in revenue due to illegal tuna and shrimp fishing in the country's exclusive economic zone by foreign trawlers.

In an effort to curb illegal fishing the Federal Government of Somalia introduced new legislation in December 2014, which banned bottom trawling by domestic and foreign vessels, made all prior licenses null and void, and reserved the first 24 nm of Somali waters for Somali fishers. Foreign fishing vessels caught an estimate 92,500 mt of fish in 2014, almost twice that caught by the Somali domestic fleet. Iran (48%) and Yemen (31%) accounted for the vast majority of foreign fish catch in the most recent year of analysis.

According to Roger Middleton of Chatham House, "The problem of overfishing and illegal fishing in Somali waters is a very serious one, and does affect the livelihoods of people inside Somalia [...] the dumping of toxic waste on Somalia's shores is a very serious issue, which will continue to affect people in Somalia long after the war has ended, and piracy is resolved". To lure fish to their traps, foreign trawlers reportedly also use fishing equipment under prohibition, such as nets with small mesh sizes and sophisticated underwater lighting systems.

Under Article 56(1)(b)(iii) of the Law of the Sea Convention:

"In the exclusive economic zone, the coastal State has jurisdiction as provided for in the relevant provisions of this Convention with regard to the protection and preservation of the marine environment".

Article 57 of the Convention in turn outlines the limit of that jurisdiction:

"The exclusive economic zone shall not extend beyond 200 nautical miles from the baselines from which the breadth of the territorial sea is measured".

According to Amedeo Policante, a researcher from Goldsmiths College, University of London: "The devastating effect of these types of corporate-led form of capital accumulation cannot be overstated in a region where, according to the most recent reports of the UNEP, over 30 million people are dependent on maritime and coastal resources for their daily livelihoods. Nevertheless, there was little or no international will to insist on the implementation of the United Nations Conventions on the Law of the Sea, which banish both over-fishing and toxic dumping in oceanic waters. This form of illegality – despite the environmental disruption and the high cost in human life it implied – was not perceived as an existential threat by states and it was therefore left unchecked. Only when piracy appeared in the region, the lack of effective sovereign control over the Gulf of Aden was problematized".

== Anti-piracy measures ==
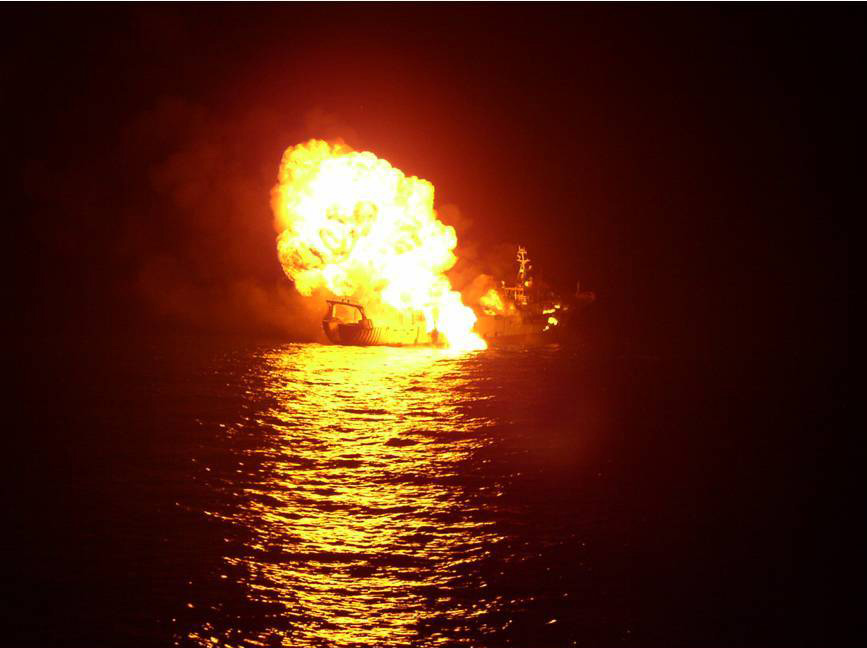
Anti piracy operations by Indian Navy's INS Tabar, in the Gulf of Aden on 18 November 2008

As of 2013, four international naval task forces operated in the region, with multiple national vessels and task forces entering and leaving the region, engaging in counter-piracy operations for various lengths of time. The three international task forces that compose the bulk of counter-piracy operations are Combined Task Force 150 (whose overarching mission is Operation Enduring Freedom), Combined Task Force 151 (which was set up in 2009 specifically to run counter-piracy operations), the EU naval task force operating under Operation Atalanta and the SADC naval task force operating under Operation Copper. All counter-piracy operations are coordinated through a monthly planning conference called Shared Awareness and Deconfliction (SHADE). Originally having representatives only from NATO, the EU, and the Combined Maritime Forces (CMF) HQ in Bahrain, it now regularly attracts representatives from over 20 countries.

Between 2009 and 2010, the government of the autonomous Puntland region in northeastern Somalia enacted a number of reforms and pre-emptive measures as a part of its officially declared anti-piracy campaign. In May 2010, construction also began on a new naval base in the town of Bandar Siyada, located 25 km west of Bosaso, the commercial capital of Puntland. These security measures appear to have borne fruit, as a number of pirates were apprehended in 2010, including a prominent leader. Puntland's security forces also reportedly managed to force out the pirate gangs from their traditional safe havens such as Eyl and Gar'ad, with the pirates now primarily operating from Hobyo, El Danaan and Harardhere in the neighboring Galmudug region.

Government officials from the Galmudug administration in the north-central Hobyo district have also reportedly attempted to use pirate gangs as a bulwark against Islamist insurgents from southern Somalia's conflict zones; other pirates are alleged to have reached agreements of their own with the Islamist groups, although a senior commander from the Hizbul Islam militia vowed to eradicate piracy by imposing sharia law when his group briefly took control of Harardhere in May 2010 and drove out the local pirates.

By the first half of 2010, these increased policing efforts by Somali government authorities on land along with international naval vessels at sea reportedly contributed to a drop in pirate attacks in the Gulf of Aden from 86 a year prior to 33, forcing pirates to shift attention to other areas such as the Somali Basin and the wider Indian Ocean.

The government of Somaliland has adopted stringent anti-piracy measures, arresting and imprisoning pirates forced to make port in Berbera.

In addition to naval patrolling and marine capacity building, the shipping industry implemented Best Management Practices (BMP) in the Piracy High Risk Area (HRA), a maritime area bounded by the Suez and the Strait of Hormuz.

The Chinese People's Liberation Army Navy began participation in anti-piracy operations in the Gulf of Aden/Horn of Africa, off the Somalia coast, in December 2008; this was the first time that the modern Chinese navy was deployed to an operational mission outside of China's claimed territorial waters. In 2017, China officially opened its first overseas military base in Djibouti; the base is used for anti-piracy operations, as well as unrelated Chinese efforts aimed at "intelligence collection, non-combat evacuation operations, peacekeeping operation support, and counterterrorism."

While NATO has terminated its anti-piracy mission in 2016, the European Union and the United States-led coalition still seeks to suppress piracy in the territorial waters of Somalia. Additionally, China also deploys warships to perform patrols.

In February 2024, Somalia signed a Memorandum of Understanding with Turkey that grants the latter control of a hydrocarbons deal, alongside 30% of the revenue in Somalia’s Exclusive Economic Zone. In exchange, Somalia will receive naval training and equipment to fight illegal fishing in its waterways. Given geopolitical diversions of larger naval powers to other regions such as the Red Sea, small and middle powers are stepping up to recalibrate the balance of power.

In recent years, the Indian navy have played an increased role in anti-piracy efforts in the region, including several instances of recapturing seized ships from pirates.

Industry and navies maintain piracy monitoring and sharing systems, such as the Mercury Chat system, facilitated by the European Union’s Maritime Security Centre Indian Ocean, which facilitates coordination between military and maritime law enforcement organisations.

== Trials ==
In May 2010, a Yemeni court sentenced six Somali pirates to death and jailed six others for 10 years each, for hijacking a Yemeni oil tanker, killing one cabin crew member and leaving another missing in April 2009.

In May 2010, another Somali, Abduwali Muse, pleaded guilty in a New York federal court to seizing a United States-flagged ship Maersk Alabama and kidnapping its captain, an event that was later dramatized in the film Captain Phillips. Muse was sentenced to 33 years imprisonment.

The first European trial of alleged Somali pirates opened in the Netherlands in May 2010. They were arrested in the Gulf of Aden in January 2009, when their high-speed boat was intercepted by a Danish frigate while allegedly preparing to board the cargo ship Samanyolu, which was registered in the Dutch Antilles. The pirates were sentenced to five years in prison, which was less than the maximum possible sentence. It is unlikely the men will be returned to Somalia after their sentence, as Somalia is considered too dangerous for deportation. One of the five has already applied for asylum in the Netherlands. Consequently, there are concerns that trials in European courts would encourage, rather than deter, pirates. However, trials are continuing in Europe. More recently in Paris, November 2011, five men were sentenced to between four and eight years; one man was acquitted. A trial was also held in Hamburg for ten Somali pirates who had hijacked the freighter Taipan in 2010. They were found guilty in 2012 and sentenced to 6–7 years in prison with reduced time for the juveniles among them. After release, five left Germany, the others filed for asylum. In Italy, nine Somali pirates had been tried and sentenced to prison terms of 16 and 19 years. They had been found guilty of attempted kidnapping for extortion and illegal possession of firearms, in connection with 10 October 2011 attack and seizure of an Italian-owned cargo vessel, the Montecristo.

On 1 April 2010, USS Nicholas was on patrol off the Somali coast when it took fire from men in a small skiff. After chasing down the skiff and its mothership, US military captured five Somalis. Judge Raymond A. Jackson, a Federal District Court judge in Norfolk, Virginia threw out the piracy charge, which dates from enactment in 1819 when piracy was defined only as robbery at sea. The penalty for piracy is mandatory life in prison. The U.S. government appealed the ruling. In March 2011 the five Somalis were sentenced to life for piracy to run consecutively with the 80-year term. In the same month 13 Somalis and one Yemeni suspected of hijacking and killing four Americans aboard a yacht made their first appearance in federal court in Norfolk.

On 28 January 2011, pursuant to the naval engagement of the pirate mother vessel MV Prantalay (a hijacked Thai trawler) by Car Nicobar-class fast attack craft INS Cankarso, the Indian Navy and the Indian Coast Guard killed 10 pirates and apprehended 15, while rescuing 20 Thai and Burmese fishermen that were held aboard the ship as hostages. The rescued fishermen were sent to Kochi while the 15 pirates, of Somali, Ethiopian and Kenyan origin, were taken to Mumbai. The Mumbai Police confirmed that they registered a case against the pirates for attempt to murder and various other provisions under the Indian Penal Code and the Passports Act for entering the Indian waters without permission.

In May 2012, a U.S. federal appeals court upheld the convictions of five pirates, a decision that prosecutors described as the first United States-based piracy convictions in 190 years.

In October 2013, Mohamed Abdi Hassan ("Afweyne") was arrested in Belgium for having allegedly masterminded the 2009 hijacking of the Belgian dredge vessel Pompei, abducted its crew, and participated in a criminal organization. According to federal prosecutor Johan Delmulle, Hassan was responsible for the hijacking of dozens of commercial ships from 2008 to 2013. In March 2016, Hassan was tried in Bruges and sentenced to twenty years imprisonment for leading the 2009 hijacking of the Pompei.

In 2024, India was to prosecute the 35 Somali pirates that its navy captured off a hijacked ship.

== See also ==
- August 2009 Egyptian hostage escape
- April 2009 raid off Somalia
- 2012 Italian Navy Marines shooting incident in the Laccadive Sea
- Basel Convention on the Control of Transboundary Movements of Hazardous Wastes and Their Disposal
- CIA's Special Activities Division
- Drone strikes in Somalia
- Combined Task Force 150 and Combined Task Force 151 coalition force counter-piracy operations in the region.
- Contact Group on Piracy off the Coast of Somalia
- International Maritime Bureau
- International Maritime Organization
- Operation Atalanta
- Operation Enduring Freedom – Horn of Africa
- Operation Prosperity Guardian
- Red Sea crisis
- People's Armed Forces Maritime Militia
- Piracy around the Horn of Africa
- Piracy in the Gulf of Guinea
- Piracy in the Strait of Malacca
- Piracy on Falcon Lake
- Pirate Round
- Ship Security Alert System
