= Terence E. McKnight =

United States admiral

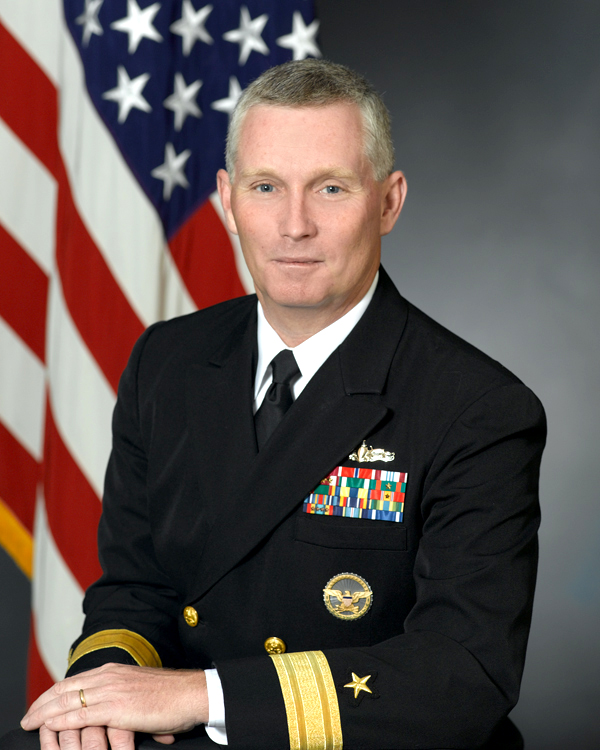
- RDML Terence E. McKnight
- Born: February 12, 1956 (age 70); Norfolk, Virginia
- Military career
- Allegiance: United States of America
- Service years: 1978–2009
- Rank: Rear Admiral (lower half)
- Commands: USS Whidbey Island; USS Kearsarge; Task Force 151
- Awards: Legion of Merit; Bronze Star; Defense Meritorious Service Medal

Rear Admiral Terence Edward "Terry" McKnight, United States Navy, is a former American naval officer who commanded a multi-national naval force tasked to confront piracy activities off the coast of Somalia.

== Educational background ==
Rear Admiral Terence E. McKnight, is from Norfolk, Virginia. He graduated from the Virginia Military Institute in May 1978. In May 1998, he completed his master's degree in International Relations at Salve Regina University. He also graduated from the U.S. Army War College in 1994 and attended the National Security Seminar at Syracuse University in 2001.

== Sea duty ==
Among Admiral Mcknight's early sea duty assignments were, the USS El Paso (LKA-117), USS John L. Hall (FFG-32), USS Shreveport (LPD-12) and executive officer of the USS Cayuga (LST-1186). He commanded the USS Whidbey Island (LSD-41) from January 1995 until November 1996 and the USS Kearsarge (LHD-3) from July 2002 until December 2003.

== Shore duty ==
A number of his duties ashore included, serving as Assistant Lieutenant Commander Detailer at the Bureau of Naval Personnel (BUPERS), an Aide and Administrative Assistant to the Chief of Naval Personnel, Surface Warfare Officers School, Command Training Department as Head Expeditionary Warfare Instructor, the Office of the Secretary of Defense (OSD), Executive Assistant to the Assistant Secretary of the Navy (Manpower & Reserve Affairs), the Office of Chief of Naval Operations N6/N7, and Executive Assistant to the Under Secretary of the Navy.

McKnight eventually served as the 85th Commandant of Naval District Washington (which is the oldest continuously operated Navy installation in the nation), and the Deputy Commander of the Joint Force Headquarters National Capital Region.

== Last assignment ==
In September 2007, he began his final assignment as Commander, Expeditionary Strike Group 2.

Admiral McKnight commanded a new multi-national naval force to confront piracy off the coast of Somalia. This new anti-piracy force was designated Combined Task Force 151 (CTF-151), a multinational task force of the Combined Maritime Forces (CMF).

In the summer of 2009, Admiral McKnight retired from the Navy.

== Postmilitary career ==
In October 2012, he authored a book on maritime piracy entitled Pirate Alley: Commanding Task Force 151 in the Gulf of Aden which was published by the Naval Institute Press.

McKnight is currently employed by Cobham plc, a British defense contracting company as vice president for government relations at its subsidiary, Cobham's Defense System Division.

== Honors and awards ==
McKnight's personal decorations include the Navy Distinguished Service Medal, Legion of Merit, Bronze Star, Defense Meritorious Service Medal, Meritorious Service Medal, Navy Commendation Medal, Navy Achievement Medal, as well as various other unit awards and decorations.

Surface Warfare insignia

Office of the Secretary of Defense Identification Badge

| | Legion of Merit (with 3 award stars) |
| | Bronze Star |
| | Defense Meritorious Service Medal |
| | Meritorious Service Medal (with 3 award star) |
| | Navy and Marine Corps Commendation Medal |
| | Navy and Marine Corps Achievement Medal (with 1 award stars) |
| | Navy Unit Commendation |
| | Navy Expeditionary Medal |
| | National Defense Service Medal (with 1 service star) |
| | Global War on Terrorism Expeditionary Medal |
| | Global War on Terrorism Service Medal |
| | Armed Forces Service Medal |
| | Navy Sea Service Deployment Ribbon (with 4 service stars) |
| | Special Operations Service Ribbon |
| [[Image:|60px|alt=]] | NATO Medal |

== See also ==
Combined Task Force 151
