= Catherine Zara Raymond =

Catherine Zara Raymond is an international maritime security expert. She is an Associate at the Corbett Centre for Maritime Policy Studies, based at the Joint Services Command and Staff College, Defence Academy of the United Kingdom.

== Career ==
Raymond is also a PhD student at King's College London, where she is writing her thesis on political Islam. Raymond worked as an analyst for the security consultancy, Control Risks, and as an associate research fellow at the S. Rajaratnam School of International Studies at Nanyang Technological University in Singapore.

She is a coeditor and contributing author of the volume "Best of Times, Worst of Times: Maritime Security in the Asia-Pacific", and the policy paper titled "Safety and Security in the Malacca and Singapore Straits". Her articles have been published in the Harvard Asia Quarterly, the Maritime Studies Journal, Jamestown Foundation's Terrorism Monitor, the Journal of the Australian Naval Institute, The Straits Times, and a number of other publications. Her latest papers were published in the Journal of Terrorism and Political Violence, in an edited volume produced by Routledge titled "Maritime Security in Southeast Asia" and in an edited volume entitled, "Lloyd's MIU Handbook of Maritime Security". Recently she was interviewed by CNBC regarding security in the Strait of Malacca, and was consulted by The Economist on piracy off the coast of Somalia.

== Publications ==
- "Countering piracy and armed robbery at sea in Asia and Africa: Can lessons learnt fighting piracy in the Straits of Malacca be applied to the case of Somalia?," in Emerging Naval Powers, Robert Ross, Peter Dutton and Øystein Tunsjø (Eds.), Routledge, 2012.
- "Al Muhajiroun and Islam4UK: The group behind the ban," Developments in Radicalisation and Political Violence Papers, International Centre for the Study of Radicalisation and Political Violence, King’s College London, May 2010.
- Piracy and Maritime Crime: Africa, Asia, and Southeast Asia, edited by Bruce Elleman and S.C.M. Paine (US Naval War College, 2009)
- "Security in the Maritime Domain and Its Evolution Since 9/11" in Lloyd's MIU Handbook of Maritime Security, S. Bateman, R. Herbert-Burns and P. Lehr (Eds.), Taylor and Francis, 2008.
- "Piracy in Southeast Asia; The Threat and the Response," in Maritime Security in Southeast Asia, John Skogen and Kwa C. Guan (Eds.), Routledge, 2007.
- "Maritime Terrorism in Southeast Asia: A Risk Assessment," Journal of Terrorism and Political Violence, Spring 2006.
- "Maritime Terrorism in Southeast Asia: Potential Scenarios," Terrorism Monitor, Jamestown Foundation, April 2006.
- "The Threat of Maritime Terrorism in the Malacca Straits," Terrorism Monitor, Jamestown Foundation, February 2006.
- Best of Times, The Worst of Times; Maritime Security in the Asia-Pacific, Catherine Zara Raymond & Joshua Ho (Eds.), World Scientific, 2005.
- "Maritime Terrorism a Risk Assessment: The Australian Example," in Best of Times, The Worst of Times; Maritime Security in the Asia-Pacific, Catherine Zara Raymond & Joshua Ho (Eds.), World Scientific, 2005.
- "Storm Over the Malacca Strait," Asia Times, August 2005.
- "Peril in the Straits of Malacca," The Hong Kong Standard, August 2005.
- "How Real is the Threat of Maritime Terrorism?" Power & Interest News Report, August 2005.
- "Piracy in Southeast Asia; New Trends Issues and Responses," Harvard Asia Quarterly, Autumn 2005.
- "Australia's New Maritime Strategy," Journal of the Australian Naval Institute, Summer 2005.
- "The Challenge of Improving Maritime Security," Journal of the Australian Naval Institute, Summer 2005.
- "Does the Maritime Security Code Work?" Straits Times, December 2004.
- "Going All Out to Keep Australia Watertight," Straits Times, November 2004.
- "Report of the Conference on the Straits of Malacca," Maritime Studies Journal, September/October 2004.
