= List of ships attacked by Somali pirates in 2009 =

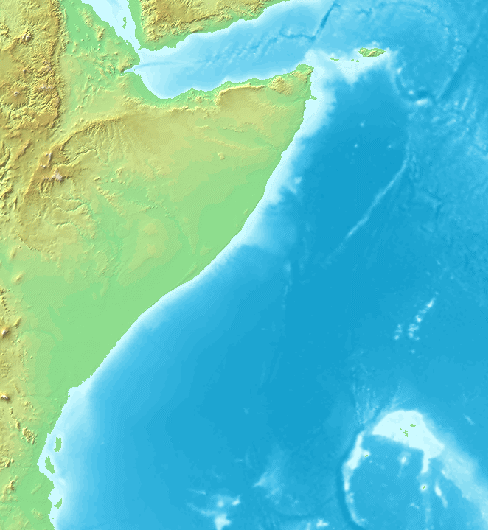
General area off the coast of Somalia where the pirates operate

Piracy off the Somali coast has threatened international shipping since the beginning of Somalia's civil war in the early 1990s. This list documents those ships attacked in 2009: for other years, see List of ships attacked by Somali pirates.

== January ==
Image	Flag (owner)	Name (class)	Crew (cargo)	Status	Date of attack	Coordinates
Image	Flag (owner)	Name (class)	Crew (cargo)	Status	Date of release	Ransom demanded
	Panama	MV S Venus (cargo ship)	(Grain)	Capture failed	2009-01-01	13°5′0″N 47°3′0″E
	Panama	MV S Venus (cargo ship)	(Grain)	Capture failed	Capture failed	
About 50 miles (80 km) off the coast of Yemen, the cargo ship S Venus was moving through the Gulf of Aden when a small boat with several pirates started to pursue it. The ship sent a distress call to a nearby French D'Estienne d'Orves-class aviso Premier-Maître L'Her that was part of an international task group sent to Somalia to help stop and deter piracy. The approaching frigate scared off the pirates, but several hours later they tried again to approach the ship. That time, the French frigate captured and boarded the boat. French forces then arrested eight men. They also found a rocket launcher, assault rifles and several boarding ladders on the pirates' vessel. According to a French spokesperson, the eight men captured would be taken to Somalia for their trial.
	Saint Kitts and Nevis (Egypt)	MV Blue Star (cargo ship)	28 (6,000 tons of Fertilizer)	Released after ransom	2009-01-01	13°55′0″N 47°58′0″E
	Saint Kitts and Nevis (Egypt)	MV Blue Star (cargo ship)	28 (6,000 tons of Fertilizer)	Released after ransom	2009-03-05	US$1,000,000
Somali pirates hijacked the Egyptian cargo ship Blue Star and its 28 crewmembers right after the ship exited the Red Sea and went into the Gulf of Aden. According to the Associated Press, there were fifteen armed pirates on board and the cargo is 6,000 tons of fertilizer. According to Egyptian Deputy Foreign minister, Ahmed Rizq, company contacts were trying to negotiate a ransom. The ship was released with all of its crew on 5 March. Afterwards the ship was en route to Kenya for refueling and then return to the Egyptian port of Alexandria.
	India	MV Abul Kalam Azad (tanker)	30 (unknown)	Capture failed	2009-01-02	13°42′0″N 50°39′0″E
	India	MV Abul Kalam Azad (tanker)	30 (unknown)	Capture failed	Capture failed	
An Indian tanker, MT Abul Kalam Azad, managed to repel two pirate skiffs with the help of the two helicopters dispatched from the Malaysian warship KD Sri Indera Sakti and an unnamed Saudi Arabian warship. It was then given a frigate escort.
	Greece	MV Kriti Episkopi (cargo ship)	29 (Oil)	Capture failed	2009-01-02	13°11′0″N 47°32′32″E
	Greece	MV Kriti Episkopi (cargo ship)	29 (Oil)	Capture failed	Capture failed	
The captain of Kriti Episkopi saw the pirates and took evasive action. When this did not work, he hailed a nearby European Union (EU) ship. Pirates in three speedboats approached Kriti Episkopi twice with machine guns and rocket-propelled grenades (RPGs) and tried to board. However, the pirates were driven away the crew, who aimed high pressure fire hoses and sprayed them. While the crew was fighting off the pirates, EU aircraft took off from the nearby Taskforce 150 and arrived to help. The air support remained by the cargo ship and scared off the pirates while a frigate came to escort the ship.
	Panama (Kenya)	MV Sea Princess II (tanker)	8 (unknown)	Released	2009-01-03	unknown
	Panama (Kenya)	MV Sea Princess II (tanker)	8 (unknown)	Released	2009-04-26	unknown
An oil tanker, registered in Panama, was hijacked on 2 or 3 January. The ship had a crew of eight Indian sailors. On 26 April 2009, Ecoterra International announced that the ship had been released.
	Netherlands Antilles	MV Samanyolu ()	()		2009-01-02	unknown
	Netherlands Antilles	MV Samanyolu ()	()			'
The Dutch Antilles-flagged ship Samanyolu was attacked by pirates but fired a flare at them, setting the pirate boat on fire. The Danish HDMS Absalon intervened and arrested five pirates. They were to be tried in Rotterdam.
	Kenya	FV Victoria IV (fishing vessel)	7 (unknown)	3 Crew Members Kidnapped	2009-01-08	unknown
	Kenya	FV Victoria IV (fishing vessel)	7 (unknown)	3 Crew Members Kidnapped	3 Crew Members Kidnapped	unknown
A small fishing vessel was attacked off the Somali coast, with a crew of four Kenyans and three Indian sailors. The pirates attacked the vessel which was anchored at the Kenyan harbor of Kiunga, 18 km (11 mi) from the Somali border. Three people of Somali origin came in a fast skiff during the night and boarded the ship, kidnapping the three Indian crew members and mysteriously leaving the Kenyan crew unharmed. The pirates also left the ship unharmed and did not remove it from its anchorage. The ship belongs to a Kenyan company known as the Southern Engineering Company, which is part of the Alpha Group, known to be fishing illegally in Somali waters. It is possible that the kidnapping was a revenge attack targeting the company and its fishermen, also possibly involving the Kenyan sailors who may have been working with the kidnappers.
	Liberia (Netherlands)	(freighter)	()		2009-1-14	unknown
Rescued in the Gulf of Aden by a Russian warship. Two motor boats attacked the Dutch ship, but were chased off by the Russians after firing two rocket-propelled grenades at it and the Russians.
	Bahamas (Germany)	MV Longchamp (tanker)	13 (liquefied petroleum gas)	Released after ransom	2009-01-29	unknown
	Bahamas (Germany)	MV Longchamp (tanker)	13 (liquefied petroleum gas)	Released after ransom	2009-03-28	Not yet demanded
The oil tanker MV Longchamp and its crew of 12 Filipinos and one Indonesian was captured when the ship was at a distance from patrolling ships. The crew is believed to be safe, even though a gunshot was heard over the ship's radio.

== February ==
Image	Flag (owner)	Name (class)	Crew (cargo)	Status	Date of attack	Coordinates
Image	Flag (owner)	Name (class)	Crew (cargo)	Status	Date of release	Ransom demanded
	Malta (Greece)	MV Saldanha (cargo ship)	22 (19 Filipinos) (Coal)	Released	2009-02-22	unknown
	Malta (Greece)	MV Saldanha (cargo ship)	22 (19 Filipinos) (Coal)	Released	2009-04-25	unknown
A Russian-owned (chartered from a Greek firm) cargo ship, with a crew of 22, was hijacked while sailing to Slovenia loaded with a cargo of coal. The previous day the ship issued a distress call to HMS Northumberland. Helicopters from HMS Northumberland and USS Vella Gulf were despatched with the US Navy declaring no threat. After the ship was captured, the Royal Navy seized a skiff believed to have been used in the attack. RPG munitions were offloaded into the sea along with cans of petrol and the skiff destroyed. Its hijacking was partially documented in the Sky TV programme Ross Kemp in Search of Pirates.

== March ==
Image	Flag (owner)	Name (class)	Crew (cargo)	Status	Date of attack	Coordinates
Image	Flag (owner)	Name (class)	Crew (cargo)	Status	Date of release	Ransom demanded
	Antigua and Barbuda (Germany)	MV Courier (container ship)	unknown (unknown)	Capture failed	2009-03-03	unknown
	Antigua and Barbuda (Germany)	MV Courier (container ship)	unknown (unknown)	Capture failed	Capture failed	
The Action of 3 March 2009. At 7:12 local time the 14,969-ton Antigua and Barbuda-registered container ship Courier, owned by a Bremen-based shipping company and manned by a Filipino crew, sent a distress message reporting the attack of pirates on board a small vessel. The assailants fired rocket propelled grenades and automatic rifles at the freighter. The emergency call was received by the German frigate Rheinland-Pfalz, 50 nautical miles (93 km; 58 mi) away. The German warship dispatched her Westland Lynx helicopter to the scene, which fired warning shots at the hostile launch. The Sea Lynx was joined by a Sikorsky SH-60 Seahawk from the US guided-missile cruiser USS Monterey. Some hours later, the pirate skiff was intercepted by the German frigate and seized by German marines, who captured nine suspects. The German boarding party found a cache of one rocket launcher, three AK-47 rifles, a Tokarev pistol, a carbine and an automatic rifle. This was the first time that the German Navy seized a hostile vessel and her crew at sea since the Second World War.
	Vietnam	MV Diamond Falcon (cargo ship)	unknown (unknown)	Capture failed	2009-03-14	unknown
	Vietnam	MV Diamond Falcon (cargo ship)	unknown (unknown)	Capture failed	Capture failed	
The 22,500-ton Vietnamese cargo ship MV Diamond Falcon was attacked by pirates who used two small boats, in the area about 57 miles (92 km) from the Yemeni port of Mukalla. This was the first time the Turkish frigate TCG Giresun joined the anti-piracy forces. The destroyer joined international naval forces at the Gulf of Aden two weeks previous. Giresun and the Danish warship HDMS Absalon immediately responded after receiving the emergency from the Vietnamese cargo ship. Helicopters from the Turkish and Danish warships prevented the pirates from taking over the Vietnamese ship.
	Iran	FV Safari (fishing vessel)	14 (unknown)	Captured	2009-03-16	unknown
	Iran	FV Safari (fishing vessel)	14 (unknown)	Captured	Captured	
An Iranian factory fishing ship was captured by pirates off the coast of Puntland in an apparent vigilante action. These pirates seem to be local villagers from the area that captured the ship without the authority of the Puntland government. The reasons for the capture seem to be based on illegal fishing activities and the destruction of local fishermen's nets and equipment. Later, the Iranian authorities condemned the Somali pirates.
	Saint Vincent and the Grenadines (Greece)	MV Titan (cargo ship)	24 (Steel)	Released	2009-03-19	unknown
	Saint Vincent and the Grenadines (Greece)	MV Titan (cargo ship)	24 (Steel)	Released	2009-04-16	unknown
A cargo ship belonging to the Greek Albamare City shipping company was seized in the Gulf of Aden as it was transporting steel from the Black Sea to South Korea, along with its crew of 24. Three of the crew members are Greek, including the captain. The remaining crew consist of 1 Ukrainian, 3 Romanians, and 17 Filipinos.
	Turkey	MV Ulusoy 8 (cargo ship)	unknown (unknown)	Capture failed	2009-03-19	unknown
	Turkey	MV Ulusoy 8 (cargo ship)	unknown (unknown)	Capture failed	Capture failed	
On 19 March an attack occurred on a Turkish cargo vessel in the Gulf of Aden. Ulusoy 8 reported that it was under attack by two fast moving skiffs. The Turkish General Staff stated that the frigate TCG Giresun rebuffed the pirates and prevented the attack by sending a helicopter to intercept them.
	India	MV Al Rafiquei (cargo ship)	16 (Rice, Refined oil, Wheat, and General cargo)	Released	2009-03-21	unknown
	India	MV Al Rafiquei (cargo ship)	16 (Rice, Refined oil, Wheat, and General cargo)	Released	2009-03-21	none
Around 05:00 (UTC) on 21 March pirates captured a cargo vessel with a 16-man Indian crew. The pirates beat the crew, stole their mobile phones, and removed 5 barrels (0.79 m^{3}) of petrol and 20 barrels (3.2 m^{3}) of diesel. The ship was on its way from Dubai, United Arab Emirates, to Mogadishu, Somalia, when it was intercepted by the pirates. Eventually they released the ship at 13:00 (UTC) on the same day.
	Philippines (Japan)	MV Jasmine Ace (cargo ship)	18 (Automobiles)	Capture failed	2009-03-22	unknown
	Philippines (Japan)	MV Jasmine Ace (cargo ship)	18 (Automobiles)	Capture failed	Capture failed	
Pirates attacked a Japanese cargo ship in the Gulf of Aden that was able to escape by zigzagging away from the pirates. The pirates were in two small vessels and fired off automatic weapons and rocket-propelled grenades before escaping. The 18-man Filipino crew were unharmed in the attack. The ship was heading to the Kenyan port of Mombasa when the attack occurred.
	Panama (Greece)	MV Nipayia (Tanker)	19 (Chemicals)	Released	2009-03-25	unknown
	Panama (Greece)	MV Nipayia (Tanker)	19 (Chemicals)	Released	2009-05-09	Not yet demanded.
On the afternoon of 25 March, pirates attacked the Greek tanker Nipayia approximately 450 miles (720 km) off the coast of Somalia. The crew consisted of 18 Filipinos, a Russian captain and is managed by Athens-based Lotus Shipping.
	Seychelles	MV Serenity (yacht)	2 (private vessel)	Missing, presumed captured	2009-03-25	unknown
	Seychelles	MV Serenity (yacht)	2 (private vessel)	Missing, presumed captured	2009-06-21	
On this date, the Seychelles state broadcaster reported the yacht had vanished after departing for Madagascar on 28 February, and is presumed to have been captured on an unknown date. The crew were released on 21 June 2009 and the boat was torched and sunk of the Somali coast due to the full ransom of US$1 million not being paid, the ransom paid was US$450,000.
	[[|]]	MV Explorer III MV Ocean Explorer (cargo ship)	unknown (unknown)	Capture failed	2009-03-25	unknown
The two ships were traveling together when two small boats began chasing. The ships sped up and outran them.
	[[|]]	MV FD Gennaro Aurilia (cargo ship)	unknown (unknown)	Capture failed	2009-03-25	unknown
The ship noticed a suspicious fishing boat and radioed nearby naval vessels while increasing speed. The other boat switched off its light and left the area.
	Bahamas (Norway)	MV Bow Asir (Tanker)	23 (Unknown)	Released	2009-03-26	unknown
	Bahamas (Norway)	MV Bow Asir (Tanker)	23 (Unknown)	Released	2009-04-10	Unspecified
On the morning of 26 March 2009, a group of 16–18 pirates attacked the Norwegian tanker Bow Asir approximately 250 miles (400 km) off the coast of Somalia. The crew reportedly numbered 27 with a Russian captain, however the U.S. Navy's 5th fleet reported that the total crew was 23. Her owners, Salhus Shipping AS received a security alert message from Bow Asir at 0729(UTC) saying the ship was being chased by two small boats with suspected pirates on board. At 7.45am her captain reported that pirates had boarded the vessel. Approximately three hours later Salhus Shipping reported receiving an email from the vessel confirming that 16 to 18 pirates armed with machine guns had gained control of the ship. According to Norwegian press, Bow Asir was released in exchange for an unspecified ransom on 10 April 2009.
FGS Spessart (A1442)	Germany	German tanker Spessart (Replenishment tanker)	52 (Fuel)	Capture failed, pirates detained	2009-03-30	unknown
FGS Spessart (A1442)	Germany	German tanker Spessart (Replenishment tanker)	52 (Fuel)	Capture failed, pirates detained	Capture failed	
Early in the morning of 30 March 2009, a group of Somali pirates approached the German naval replenishment tanker Spessart, opened fire upon it and attempted to board the vessel. The attack was averted by the on-board security detachment, who opened fire on the pirates. A chase then ensued, ending with the pirates being stopped and detained by the German frigate Rheinland-Pfalz.

== April ==
Image	Flag (owner)	Name (class)	Crew (cargo)	Status	Date of attack	Coordinates
Image	Flag (owner)	Name (class)	Crew (cargo)	Status	Date of release	Ransom demanded
	Germany	MV Hansa Stavanger (cargo ship)	25 (Containers)	Released after ransom paid	2009-04-04	unknown
	Germany	MV Hansa Stavanger (cargo ship)	25 (Containers)	Released after ransom paid	Released after ransom paid	two million dollars
The German-owned Hansa Stavanger was captured by pirates on 4 April 2009. Around 1 May 2009, USS Boxer assisted around 200 members of the German special operations unit GSG-9 get close to the hijacked German container ship Hansa Stavanger. During the last phase of the operation, the U.S. president's security advisor James Jones withheld final approval for the operation out of concern for the safety of the 25 sailors aboard the vessel. This led the German department of defense to abort the planned attack on the freighter for now and the GSG-9 unit returned to their base of operations at the airport of Mombassa, Kenya. Among the captured sailors held hostage were eleven Tuvaluans and one Fijian. A ransom of US$15 million was demanded. The government of Tuvalu indicated that it was incapable of paying, and expressed concern for its citizens. In August 2009, the ship was released after a ransom of two million dollars, according to the pirates on the ship, was paid.
	Israel	MV Africa Star (cargo ship)	25 (Containers)	Capture failed	2009-04-04	unknown
	Israel	MV Africa Star (cargo ship)	25 (Containers)	Capture failed	Capture failed	
The Israeli-owned MV Africa Star was attacked by nine pirates on 4 April 2009. They were unable to board the ship because the crew of the ship had hung coils of barbed wire around the hull. They abandoned the attempt to hijack the ship after a British patrol aircraft was sent to the area. A second attempt took place later that week, when two pirate boats approached the ship and opened fire, but were driven off when Israeli security guards on board returned fire.
	Singapore	MV Pacific Opal (chemical tanker)	unknown (unknown)	Capture failed	2011-04-05	unknown
	Singapore	MV Pacific Opal (chemical tanker)	unknown (unknown)	Capture failed	Capture failed	
The Canadian frigate HMCS Winnipeg was escorting another vessel when it received a distress from Pacific Opal, an Indian-crewed vessel. Two skiffs were approaching it. HMCS Winnipeg sent a Sea King helicopter to investigate, and the three skiffs retreated.
	France	Tanit (Yacht)	5 ()	Rescued	2009-04-04	unknown
	France	Tanit (Yacht)	5 ()	Rescued	2009-04-10	
The French yacht was captured by pirates on 4 April 2009, taking hostage a couple, their 3-year-old child, and two friends of the family who joined them in Aden. They were supposed to join Mayotte, and left Vannes on 26 July. The French forces stormed the yacht on 10 April while the pirates refused French offers to free the hostages. One hostage, Florent Lemaçon, 28, was killed, and the four other freed, including the child. Two pirates were killed and three others captured.
	Yemen	(Tug)	()	Captured	2009-04-05	unknown
	Yemen	(Tug)	()	Captured	Captured	
A Yemeni tug was captured by pirates on 5 April 2009.
	Panama (United Kingdom)	MV Malaspina Castle (cargo ship)	24 (Iron ore)	Released	2009-04-06	unknown
	Panama (United Kingdom)	MV Malaspina Castle (cargo ship)	24 (Iron ore)	Released	2009-05-09	
The British-owned, Panamanian-flagged Malaspina Castle was boarded by pirates in the Gulf of Aden and captured on 6 April 2009.
	Taiwan	Win Far 161 (Fishing vessel)	30 (Tuna)	Released	2009-04-06	unknown
	Taiwan	Win Far 161 (Fishing vessel)	30 (Tuna)	Released	2010-02-11	
Taiwanese fishing vessel FV Win Far 161 was captured by pirates on 6 April 2009. The ship was released on 11 February 2010 after a ransom was paid. Three of the 30 crew had died during their time held hostage. It was used as the mothership for the Maersk Alabama hijacking.
	United States (Denmark)	MV Maersk Alabama (cargo ship)	21 (UN food aid)	Crew regained control	2009-04-08	unknown
	United States (Denmark)	MV Maersk Alabama (cargo ship)	21 (UN food aid)	Crew regained control	2009-04-08	
Main article: Maersk Alabama hijacking The Danish-owned Maersk Alabama was captured by pirates on 8 April 2009 some 400 miles (640 km) east of Mogadishu. The 21 American crew were taken hostage, but were later able to retake the ship. On 12 April 2009, a team of United States Navy SEALs snipers killed the three pirates holding Captain Richard Phillips hostage aboard a lifeboat from Maersk Alabama, rescuing the captain; one pirate was captured alive that was already on board USS Bainbridge according to US Navy Vice Admiral William E. Gortney. USS Boxer was also participating in the operation. This was later made into a movie.
	[[|]]	unknown (unknown)	('unknown')	Capture failed	2009-04-10	unknown
	[[|]]	unknown (unknown)	('unknown')	Capture failed	capture failed	
The Canadian frigate HMCS Winnipeg intervened to rescue a civilian ship under fire by a pirate skiff. A boarding team was sent to conduct a weapons inspection, but the would-be pirates "threw items overboard". A Spanish ship also participated in the rescue.
	Italy	Buccaneer (tugboat)	16 (empty barges)	Released	2009-04-11	unknown
	Italy	Buccaneer (tugboat)	16 (empty barges)	Released	2009-08-09	
The Italian-owned MV Buccaneer commercial tugboat with 16 crew members, 10 of which are Italians, was captured by pirates on 11 April.
	Panama	unknown (unknown)	(unknown)	Capture failed	2009-04-11	unknown
	Panama	unknown (unknown)	(unknown)	Capture failed	Capture failed	
A Panamanian cargo ship was attacked by Somali pirates. The attack was repulsed by water hoses. A rocket-propelled grenade failed to explode when it landed in the captain's cabin.
	Malta (Greece)	MV Panamax Anna (cargo vessel)	(unknown)	Capture failed	2009-04-13	unknown
	Malta (Greece)	MV Panamax Anna (cargo vessel)	(unknown)	Capture failed	Capture failed	
The 64,000-tonne Maltese-flagged Panamax Anna was attacked by six pirates in a boat, 177 kilometres (110 mi) north of Bosasso, Puntland, but managed to escape. The ship has the same owner as MV Irene, captured the following day.
	Saint Vincent and the Grenadines (Greece)	Irene (Cargo ship)	22 (unknown)	Released after ransom paid	2009-04-14	unknown
	Saint Vincent and the Grenadines (Greece)	Irene (Cargo ship)	22 (unknown)	Released after ransom paid	2009-09-14	$2 million
Pirates captured the Greek freighter Irene. HMCS Winnipeg tried to intervene but was too far to reach the freighter in time. Exactly five months later, the ship was released following payment of a $2 million ransom.
	Egypt	Mumtaz 1 and Samara Ahmed (Fishing vessels)	33 (unknown)	Released	2009-04-14	unknown
	Egypt	Mumtaz 1 and Samara Ahmed (Fishing vessels)	33 (unknown)	Released	2009-08-13	
Main article: August 2009 Egyptian hostage escape Pirates captured two Egyptian fishing boats in April. In August, the captive fishermen overpowered their captors, killing and wounding several and capturing others. The unharmed crew then sailed the ship to Yemen.
	Togo (Lebanon)	Sea Horse (Cargo ship)	unknown (unknown)	Released	2009-04-14	unknown
	Togo (Lebanon)	Sea Horse (Cargo ship)	unknown (unknown)	Released	2009-04-20	$100 000 'ransom'
Pirates captured the Lebanese freighter MV Sea Horse. According to a Somali elder, once the pirates learned that the ship was going to India to pick up food aid to bring back to Somalia, they freed the vessel.
	United States	MV Liberty Sun (Cargo ship)	20 (US food aid)	Capture failed	2009-04-14	unknown
	United States	MV Liberty Sun (Cargo ship)	20 (US food aid)	Capture failed	Capture failed	
The pirates attacked the ship, but failed to get aboard. The ship sustained damage to the bulkhead and was escorted to Mombasa, Kenya, by USS Bainbridge.
	Liberia	MV Safmarine Asia (Cargo ship)	unknown (unknown)	Capture failed	2009-04-15	unknown
	Liberia	MV Safmarine Asia (Cargo ship)	unknown (unknown)	Capture failed	Capture failed	
Pirates tried to capture the Liberian-registered Safmarine Asia. The French frigate Nivôse intervened and thwarted the attack with its helicopter. Nivôse tracked the pirates overnight and at dawn apprehended 11 pirates and intercepted a "pirate mother ship", which turned out to be a 10-metre (33 ft)-long boat with fuel supply.
	Denmark	MV Puma (Cargo ship)	12 (generator)	Capture failed	2009-04-16	unknown
	Denmark	MV Puma (Cargo ship)	12 (generator)	Capture failed	Capture failed	
The South Korean destroyer ROKS Munmu the Great responded to a distress call from MV Puma, which was being chased by a boat with five pirates, about 110 kilometres (68 mi) off the coast of Yemen. The Danish ship zig-zaged to avoid the pirates and launched a flare at them to delay them. The Korean ship sent its Lynx helicopter and the pirates turned back when it threatened to fire. Puma was traveling from Singapore to Germany.
	Denmark	MT Handytankers Magic (tanker)	(petroleum)	Capture failed	2009-04-18	unknown
	Denmark	MT Handytankers Magic (tanker)	(petroleum)	Capture failed	Capture failed	
The Dutch frigate HNLMS De Zeven Provinciën repulsed an attack by seven pirates on the petroleum tanker Handytankers Magic. The frigate tracked the pirates back to a "mother ship", which turned out to be a kidnapped Yemeni dhow and freed 20 captive fishermen. The seven pirates were captured without a fight, but released as the Dutch did not have the legal authority to detain them. This release came under serious criticism, and the Dutch Navy admitted it has made a mistake, and that procedures could be changed.
	Belgium	Pompei (rock dumper)	10 ()	Released after ransom	2009-04-18	unknown
	Belgium	Pompei (rock dumper)	10 ()	Released after ransom	2009-06-27	EUR 2.8 million
The Belgian rock dumper Pompei was captured by pirates (allegedly under the orders of piracy kingpin Mohamed Abdi Hassan) 600 km (370 mi) off the Somali coast en route to the Seychelles. A pirate source claimed she was being taken to the port of Harardhere The ship and her crew were released after 71 days on 28 June 2009.
	Norway	MV Front Ardenne (Tanker)	unknown (unknown)	Capture failed	2009-04-18	unknown
	Norway	MV Front Ardenne (Tanker)	unknown (unknown)	Capture failed	Capture failed	
An attack on the 80,000-ton Norwegian tanker MV Front Ardenne failed after the Royal Fleet Auxiliary ship RFA Wave Knight intervened. The Canadian frigate HMCS Winnipeg and the American frigate USS Halyburton gave pursuit, as the pirate skiff fled toward the Somalia port of Bosaso. Winnipeg shut its lights and was able to outmaneuver the pirates. Several warning shots were fired, the pirates stopped, were boarded and disarmed. Even though a rocket-propelled grenade was found on board, the pirates were let go as the Canadians did not have legal authority to detain them.
	Malta	MV Atlantica (cargo)	unknown (unknown)	Capture failed	2009-04-20	unknown
	Malta	MV Atlantica (cargo)	unknown (unknown)	Capture failed	Capture failed	
Two pirate boats pursued Atlantica 50 km (31 mi) off the coast of Yemen. The vessel engaged in evasive manoeuvres and escaped unharmed.
	Panama (China)	MV New Legend Honor (cargo)	unknown (unknown)	Capture failed	2009-04-20	unknown
	Panama (China)	MV New Legend Honor (cargo)	unknown (unknown)	Capture failed	Capture failed	
Pirates fired upon New Legend of Honor. The Canadian frigate HMCS Winnipeg and the British frigate HMS Portland stopped the attack with the help of their helicopters. The pirates escaped.
MSC Melody	Panama (Italy)	MSC Melody (cruise ship)	490 (1000 passengers)	Capture failed	2009-04-25	unknown
MSC Melody	Panama (Italy)	MSC Melody (cruise ship)	490 (1000 passengers)	Capture failed	Capture failed	
Pirates fired at the cruise ship MSC Melody with an automatic rifle and attempted to board at around 11:35 pm local time. After all passengers were escorted to their cabins, the ship's crew, which included a small Israeli security detail, attempted to fend off the pirates using a fire hose and, after that failed, by pistols. The pistol fire was successful in forcing off the pirates, although they continued to fire at the ship for ten minutes before leaving the area. The ship was approximately 325 km north of the Seychelles when attacked. The Spanish auxiliary military vessel Marques de la Ensenada escorted MSC Melody through the Gulf of Aden.
	Turkey	Ariva 3 ()	6 ()	Capture failed	2009-04-26	unknown
	Turkey	Ariva 3 ()	6 ()	Capture failed	Capture failed	
Pirates fired upon the cruise vessel Ariva 3 near the Yemeni island of Jabal Zuqar, but broke off the attack after 15 minutes for unknown reasons. The ship had no passengers and was on its way to Aden to fix an engine.
	Yemen	MV Qana (Tanker)	unknown (empty)	Rescued	2009-04-26	unknown
	Yemen	MV Qana (Tanker)	unknown (empty)	Rescued	Rescued	Pirates fined and sentenced to death
The empty oil tanker Qana was heading to Aden when it was captured by pirates. Special forces from Yemen stormed the ship using helicopters and recaptured it. Seven pirates were captured and three were killed. Four more were captured the following day. During the firefight, five Indian crew members were injured. The ship was 10 nautical miles (19 km; 12 mi) from the Yemeni coast when it was captured.

== May ==
Image	Flag (owner)	Name (class)	Crew (cargo)	Status	Date of attack	Coordinates
Image	Flag (owner)	Name (class)	Crew (cargo)	Status	Date of release	Ransom demanded
	Panama	MV Almezaan (Cargo ship)	18 (wheat and used vehicles)	Released as a Somali trader	2009-05-01	unknown
	Panama	MV Almezaan (Cargo ship)	18 (wheat and used vehicles)	Released as a Somali trader	2009-05-09	none
Said to be carrying wheat and vehicles to Mogadishu, the vessel was released without a ransom being paid.
	Malta (Greece)	MV Ariana (Cargo ship)	24 (Soya)	Released after ransom	2009-05-03	unknown
	Malta (Greece)	MV Ariana (Cargo ship)	24 (Soya)	Released after ransom	2009-12-10	$3 million
Somali pirates captured Ariana on 2 May with its 24 Ukrainian crew in the Indian Ocean en route from Brazil to the Middle East. In November, with the release of Spanish ship Alakrana, that was in contact during captivity with Ariana to give fuel, was known that within this vessel were two women and a 12-year-old girl that had been kidnapped. One of the abducted women, Larisa Salinska, a 39-year-old ship's cook, was raped by pirates. She had a miscarriage (it is unknown if she became pregnant as a result of the rape or not) with a large hemorrhage, heavy infection, and serious health problems. Alakrana's captain tried to convey Ariana's medicine to help Salinska, but Adan Jama, one of the pirates who had hijacked the Spanish ship, threw them overboard Also, according to the testimony from an Alakrana crew member, on board were two women, one of whom had given birth during the hijacking of the ship, having the baby about four months; they also said the 12-year-old girl was raped by a pirate. The ship was released on 10 December 2009 after a ransom of almost $3,000,000 was paid.
Frigate Nivôse	France	Nivôse (Floréal-class frigate)	86 (none)	Attack repelled	2009-05-03	unknown
Frigate Nivôse	France	Nivôse (Floréal-class frigate)	86 (none)	Attack repelled	Attack repelled	None
On 3 May 2009, 900 km (560 mi) off Somalia, the crew managed to lure pirates to attack the ship: mistaken for a merchant ship, Nivôse sailed into the sun to avoid being identified; as the pirates closed in, she turned about, launching her on-boarded helicopter and fast outboard vessels. 11 pirates were captured.
	Netherlands Antilles (Netherlands)	MV Marathon (cargo ship)	(coke)	Hijacked and released	2009-05-07	unknown
	Netherlands Antilles (Netherlands)	MV Marathon (cargo ship)	(coke)	Hijacked and released	2009-06-23	unknown
captured with 2,000 tons of coke between Yemen and Puntland, with 8 Ukrainian crew.
	Panama (United Arab Emirates)	MV Dubai Princess (merchant vessel)	Unknown. (Unknown)	Capture failed. Rescue successful.	2009-05-17	unknown
	Panama (United Arab Emirates)	MV Dubai Princess (merchant vessel)	Unknown. (Unknown)	Capture failed. Rescue successful.	Capture failed. Rescue successful.	None
On 17 May, the Royal Australian Navy frigates HMAS Sydney and HMAS Ballarat responded to a distress call from Dubai Princess, which reported that they were under attack from RPG-armed pirates attempting to board their vessel. Another vessel, MV MSC Stella, was also being harassed. The pirates fled the area after the two frigates and a Sea Hawk helicopter from Sydney appeared. The action occurred in international waters about 170 kilometres (92 nmi) south of Yemen. Sydney and Ballarat were on a six-month international deployment and were passing through the Gulf of Aden at the time of the incident.

== June–September ==
Image	Flag (owner)	Name (class)	Crew (cargo)	Status	Date of attack	Coordinates
Image	Flag (owner)	Name (class)	Crew (cargo)	Status	Date of release	Ransom demanded
	Antigua and Barbuda (Germany)	MV Charelle (Cargo ship)	9 ()	Released after ransom	2009-06-12	unknown
	Antigua and Barbuda (Germany)	MV Charelle (Cargo ship)	9 ()	Released after ransom	2009-12-03	
On 12 June, the German-registered Charelle was hijacked 60 nautical miles off Sur, Oman. At the time this was the farthest Somali pirates had ventured from the coast of Somalia. Charelle was released on 3 December 2009, after a ransom was paid.
	Turkey	MV Horizon-1 (Cargo ship)	23 (Dry sulfur)	Released after ransom	2009-07-08	13°14′00″N 50°40′00″E
	Turkey	MV Horizon-1 (Cargo ship)	23 (Dry sulfur)	Released after ransom	2009-10-05	US$2,750,000
On 8 July, the Turkish-owned cargo ship MV Horizon-1 carrying dry sulfur from Saudi Arabia to Jordan was hijacked at 08:29 EEST (05:29 UTC) by five armed Somali pirates in the Gulf of Aden. The ship was brought first to the Somali port Hordio along with her 23-member crew including a female third officer. On 10 July, Horizon-1 left Hordio and sailed to the so-called pirate haven of Eyl in 60 nmi (110 km; 69 mi) distance southwards, cruising at low speed for unknown reason. The vessel was harassed on 19 March as she was on its way from Ukraine to China witnessing the hijacking of the Greek vessel MV Titan. The attack had failed due to appearance of naval forces at the site. On 5 October 2009, the vessel was released with its crew against a ransom of US$2,750,000 paid by a British mediator.
	Somalia	MV Barwaqo (Cargo ship)	(Merchandise)	Rescued	2009-09-24	unknown
	Somalia	MV Barwaqo (Cargo ship)	(Merchandise)	Rescued	2009-09-24	
Pirates attacked the vessel near Mogadishu harbor. During the hijacking attempt, the Syrian captain was killed and several crewmen wounded. Somali police and African Union peacekeepers rescued the ship.

== October ==
Image	Flag (owner)	Name (class)	Crew (cargo)	Status	Date of attack	Coordinates
Image	Flag (owner)	Name (class)	Crew (cargo)	Status	Date of release	Ransom demanded
	Spain	FV Alakrana (Fishing seiner)	36 (none)	Released after ransom	2009-10-02	1°32′00″S 054°52′00″E
	Spain	FV Alakrana (Fishing seiner)	36 (none)	Released after ransom	2009-11-17	Euro2,300,000
At the moment of the attack, the vessel was out of the area protected by Operation Atalanta. Two pirates were seized and brought to Spain. Pirates demanded both a four million Euro ransom and for the two pirates to be released. On 7 November thousands gathered in Bermeo (from where most of the crew came) asking for the release of the pirates. The crew was freed without the pirates being released. The two pirates where judged in Spain in a very controversial process as it was difficult to ascertain whether one of the pirates was a minor or not. The incident made the Spanish Government change its law to allow security guards to carry guns up to 12.7 mm (0.50 in) in vessels with Spanish flag. Spanish journals published pirates' families were given $50,000.
French oiler Somme	France	Somme (Durance-class tanker)	169 (Fuel)	Attack repelled	2009-10-07	unknown
French oiler Somme	France	Somme (Durance-class tanker)	169 (Fuel)	Attack repelled	Attack repelled	None
On 7 October 2009, Somme, an 18,000-tonne Durance-class command vessel, fuel tanker, and flagship of the French Navy, was mistaken for a cargo vessel and attacked at night in the Indian Ocean by lightly armed Somali pirates from two armed skiffs. The pirates opened fire on the ship with small arms and launchers. The ship returned fire and headed towards the pirates. The pirates attempted to flee after realizing that the ship was a military vessel. Somme intercepted one of the boats and gave chase. After an hour-long chase, the pirates surrendered and were detained aboard the ship. Other warships arrived and began searching for the escaped skiff. Somme had been operating 310 miles (500 km) off the coast of Somalia, on its way to refuel frigates patrolling shipping lanes.
	Singapore	MV Kota Wajar (Container ship)	21 (Unknown)	Released after ransom	2009-10-15	unknown
	Singapore	MV Kota Wajar (Container ship)	21 (Unknown)	Released after ransom	2009-12-28	$4 million
Captured 300 nautical miles (560 km; 350 mi) north of the Seychelles. Heading to Mombasa, Kenya. The ship was released on 28 December, with China claiming to have rescued the crew. A Canadian warship provided logistical and medical assistance to the ship.
	China	De Xin Hai (Bulk carrier)	25 (Coal)	Released after ransom	2009-10-19	unknown
	China	De Xin Hai (Bulk carrier)	25 (Coal)	Released after ransom	2009-12-28	$4 million
On 19 October 2009, the Chinese bulk carrier, owned by COSCO Qingdaq, was captured 700 miles (1,100 km) east of the Somali coastline in the Indian Ocean. Two skiffs were utilized in the capture. This was the farthest afield that the Somali pirates had ever struck, and the attack occurred with three Chinese naval vessels in the Red Sea and Indian Ocean.
	Panama (India)	MV Al-Khaliq (Bulk Carrier)	26 (Wheat [35,000 tonne])	Released after ransom paid	2009-10-22	unknown
	Panama (India)	MV Al-Khaliq (Bulk Carrier)	26 (Wheat [35,000 tonne])	Released after ransom paid	2010-02-09	$3.1 million
On 22 October 2009, this ship was hijacked as it traveled from Novorossiysk, Russia to Mombasa, Kenya. It was captured about 330 km (210 mi) off the Seychelles. At least six pirates and two skiffs were involved in the apprehension.
	United Kingdom	Lynn Rival (Yacht)	2 (None)	Released	2009-10-23	unknown
	United Kingdom	Lynn Rival (Yacht)	2 (None)	Released	2010-11-13	US$750,000
The yacht Lynn Rival was on a voyage from the Seychelles to Tanzania when she was attacked by Somali pirates. A distress call was sent. The yacht was found on 29 October following a multi-agency search but the two crew, Paul and Rachel Chandler, were not on board. It was later revealed that they were being held on board the container ship MV Kota Wajah moored off Ceel Huur, Somalia. It was later reported that Royal Navy personnel on board RFA Wave Knight witnessed the transfer of the two crew from Lynn Rival, but did not intervene for fear of causing casualties among the kidnapped couple. A ransom of US$7,000,000 (£4,300,000) had been demanded. The couple were reported to have been transferred from Koto Wajah to another vessel and then to shore. The Foreign Office had stated that no ransom would be paid and the Somali community in the United Kingdom appealed for the crew to be released on humanitarian grounds, citing the fact that the yacht was not involved in the dumping of toxic waste or illegal fishing and was in international waters. Lynn Rival was returned to the United Kingdom on RFA Wave Knight, arriving at Portland, Dorset, on 26 November 2009. The Chandlers were released over a year later on 14 November 2010 after a ransom of US$750,000 was paid.
	Thailand	Thai Union 3 (Trawler)	27 (23 Russians; 2 Filipinos; 2 Ghanians) (Fish)	Released after ransom paid.	2009-10-29	unknown
	Thailand	Thai Union 3 (Trawler)	27 (23 Russians; 2 Filipinos; 2 Ghanians) (Fish)	Released after ransom paid.	2010-07-03	$3 million
On 29 October 2009, this vessel was hijacked 200 miles (320 km) north of the Seychelles by a pair of skiffs. The ship and crew were later released after a $3 million ransom was paid.
	Yemen	Unknown (Fishing vessel)	Unknown (Unknown)	Captured	2009-10-31	unknown
	Yemen	Unknown (Fishing vessel)	Unknown (Unknown)	Captured	Captured	Unknown
On 31 October 2009, this vessel was hijacked near Eyl, with one of the pirates being killed by the armed crew during the effort.
	France	Avel Vad (Trawler)	Unknown (Unknown)	Attack repelled	2009-10-31	unknown
	France	Avel Vad (Trawler)	Unknown (Unknown)	Attack repelled	Attack repelled	None
On 31 October 2009, this vessel was attacked early in the morning between the Somali coast and the Seychelles. The crew repelled the attempted hijacking by firing flares.

== November ==
Image	Flag (owner)	Name (class)	Crew (cargo)	Status	Date of attack	Coordinates
Image	Flag (owner)	Name (class)	Crew (cargo)	Status	Date of release	Ransom demanded
	Panama (Saint Vincent and the Grenadines)	Almezaan (Cargo ship)	18 (armoured vehicles)	Released after ransom	2009-11-07	unknown
	Panama (Saint Vincent and the Grenadines)	Almezaan (Cargo ship)	18 (armoured vehicles)	Released after ransom	2009-11-20	
Almezaan was captured a second time on 7 November. It was claimed that it was carrying weapons but this was denied by her owners. A$3,000,000-dollar ransom was demanded, but a lower amount was paid and the ship was released.
	Marshall Islands (Greece)	MV Delvina (Bulk carrier)	21 (Wheat)	Released after ransom paid	2009-11-05	unknown
	Marshall Islands (Greece)	MV Delvina (Bulk carrier)	21 (Wheat)	Released after ransom paid	2009-12-17	Unknown
On 5 November 2009, this vessel was attacked and captured 280 nautical miles (520 km; 320 mi) east of Tanzania, on its way to Mombasa, Kenya.
	Singapore (British Virgin Islands)	MV Theresa VIII (Chemical tanker)	28 (Unknown)	Released	2009-11-05	unknown
	Singapore (British Virgin Islands)	MV Theresa VIII (Chemical tanker)	28 (Unknown)	Released	2010-03-16	None
On 17 November 2009, this vessel was attacked and captured 180 nautical miles (330 km; 210 mi) northwest of the Seychelles, on its way to Mombasa, Kenya. The crew of the vessel was composed entirely of North Koreans. It was later released.
	Hong Kong	MV BW Lion (Tanker)	Unknown (Unknown)	Attack repelled	2009-11-07	unknown
	Hong Kong	MV BW Lion (Tanker)	Unknown (Unknown)	Attack repelled	Attack repelled	None
Somali pirates attacked BW Lion when she was 400 nautical miles (740 km; 460 mi) northeast of the Seychelles and 1,000 nautical miles (1,900 km; 1,200 mi) off the coast of Somalia. The ship's crew managed to evade the attack.
	Marshall Islands (Greece)	MV Filitsa (Bulk carrier)	22 (Unknown)	Released	2009-11-17	unknown
	Marshall Islands (Greece)	MV Filitsa (Bulk carrier)	22 (Unknown)	Released	2010-2-1	unknown
Somali pirates captured Filitsa some 36 nautical miles (67 km) off Balhaf, Yemen. The vessel was released on 1 February 2010, after the ship's owner, Order Shipping, paid an undisclosed amount of ransom money.
	United States (Denmark)	MV Maersk Alabama (cargo ship)	21 (food)	Attack repelled	2009-11-18	unknown
	United States (Denmark)	MV Maersk Alabama (cargo ship)	21 (food)	Attack repelled	Attack repelled	None
Somali pirates attacked Maersk Alabama some 350 nautical miles (650 km; 400 mi) east of Somalia. The attack was repelled when the crew returned fire at the pirates.
	Greece	MV Maran Centaurus (tanker)	28 (oil)	Released	2009-11-30	unknown
	Greece	MV Maran Centaurus (tanker)	28 (oil)	Released	2010-01-19	US$5,500,000 to $7,000,000
Somali pirates captured Maran Centaurus some 800 nautical miles (1,500 km; 920 mi) east of Somalia. The ship was carrying US$140 million in crude oil at the time of its capture. The ship was released on 19 January after a ransom of between US$5,500,000 and $7,000,000 was paid.
	Panama (Greece)	MV Theoforos 1 (Tanker)	25 (Grain)	Ship Boarded, Attack repelled	2009-11-02	unknown
	Panama (Greece)	MV Theoforos 1 (Tanker)	25 (Grain)	Ship Boarded, Attack repelled	2009-11-02	
On November 2nd 0901UTC The Turkish Naval Ship 'Gediz' intervened upon a distress call to prevent the hijacking of the Greek-owned MV Theoforos (Athens News Agency-Macedonian News Agency, November 6; Montena Informativna Agencija, November 5; Today's Zaman, November 6). The Gediz fired warning shots at the pirates before deploying a helicopter in support. The action resulted in the capture of five pirates (Hurriyet, November 5). Nov 5 (Reuters) - Turkish navy commandos detained five pirates trying to hijack a Greek ship in the Gulf of Aden, the Turkish military said on Thursday. The Greek boat was travelling 70 miles from the coast in a security corridor when pirates in a motor boat fired on the vessel with small arms and rockets. "The (Turkish naval ship) TCG Gediz prevented the ship hijacking with warning shots and helicopter backup ... The TCG Gediz reacted to the call for help issued by the M/V Theoforos and detained the five bandits on board the motor boat," the military said in a statement.

== December ==
Image	Flag (owner)	Name (class)	Crew (cargo)	Status	Date of attack	Coordinates
Image	Flag (owner)	Name (class)	Crew (cargo)	Status	Date of release	Ransom demanded
	Pakistan	MV Shahzaib (Fishing vessel)	29 ()	Released	2009-12-6	unknown
	Pakistan	MV Shahzaib (Fishing vessel)	29 ()	Released	2010-1-2	
The ship was captured 300 nautical miles (560 km; 350 mi) east of Socotra Island near the Gulf of Aden, and later used to hijack MV Asian Glory, a UK-owned car carrier.
	Yemen	MV Al Mahmoud 2 (cargo ship)	15 (unknown)	Captured	2009-12-28	unknown
	Yemen	MV Al Mahmoud 2 (cargo ship)	15 (unknown)	Captured	Captured	
The ship was reported to have been captured on 28 December.
	United Kingdom	MV St James Park (chemical tanker)	26 (Chemicals)	Released after ransom	2009-12-28	unknown
	United Kingdom	MV St James Park (chemical tanker)	26 (Chemicals)	Released after ransom	Released after ransom	
The ship was reported to have been captured on 28 December while on a voyage from Thailand to Spain. The ship was later released after a ransom was paid.
	Panama (Greece)	MV Navios Apollon (cargo ship)	19 (Unknown)	Released after ransom paid	2009-12-28	unknown
	Panama (Greece)	MV Navios Apollon (cargo ship)	19 (Unknown)	Released after ransom paid	2010-02-28	Unknown
The ship was reported to have been captured north of the Seychelles on 28 December while on a voyage from Florida to India.
