= Operation Ocean Shield =

NATO operation in the Horn of Africa

- Part of Operation Enduring Freedom – Horn of Africa
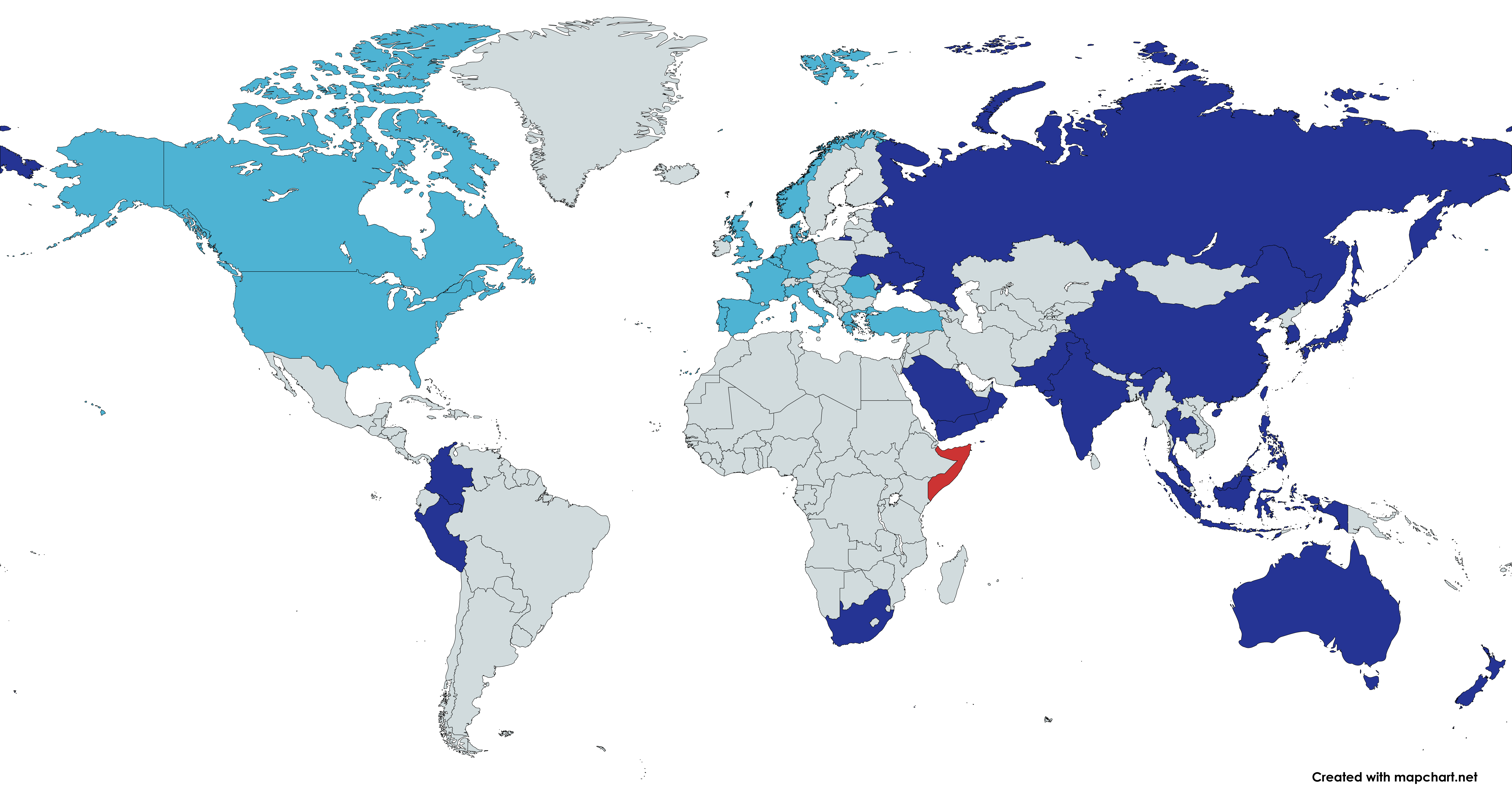
- Map of all the countries involved, including NATO countries (Cyan), Non-NATO countries (Dark Blue), and Somalia (Red), where the majority of pirates were from
Date	17 August 2009 – 24 November 2016
Location	Indian Ocean, Gulf of Aden, Guardafui Channel, Arabian Sea, Red Sea
Result	Allied victory

Belligerents
NATO; Denmark; United Kingdom; United States; France; Netherlands; Spain; Greece; Romania; Germany; Belgium; Canada; Italy; Portugal; Turkey; Norway; Non-NATO: Australia; China; Colombia; India; Indonesia; Japan; Malaysia; New Zealand; Oman; Pakistan; Peru; Philippines; Russia; Saudi Arabia; Seychelles; Singapore; South Africa; South Korea; Taiwan; Thailand; Ukraine; Yemen	Somali pirates (Somalia): Local fishermen; Ex-militiamen; Technical experts; Central Regional Coast Guard

Operation Ocean Shield was NATO's anti-Piracy in Somalia initiative in the Indian Ocean, Guardafui Channel, Gulf of Aden and Arabian Sea. It follows the earlier Operation Allied Protector. Naval operations began on 17 August 2009 after being approved by the North Atlantic Council, and were terminated on 15 December 2016 by NATO. Operation Ocean Shield focused on protecting the ships of Operation Allied Provider, which transported relief supplies as part of the World Food Programme's mission in the region. The initiative also helped strengthen the navies and coast guards of regional states to assist in countering pirate attacks. Notably, the Italian Military Support Base in Djibouti contributed, utilizing naval vessels such as the Italian Francesco Mimbelli and San Marco in the Gulf of Aden, Indian Ocean, and off the coast of Somalia. Additionally, China, Japan, and South Korea sent warships to participate in these activities.

The United States Navy was the largest contributor of ships, followed by the Indian Navy. The taskforce was composed of ships from the contributing navies, led by a designated leadship. The role of leadship was rotated among the various countries involved.

== Allies and other organizations ==
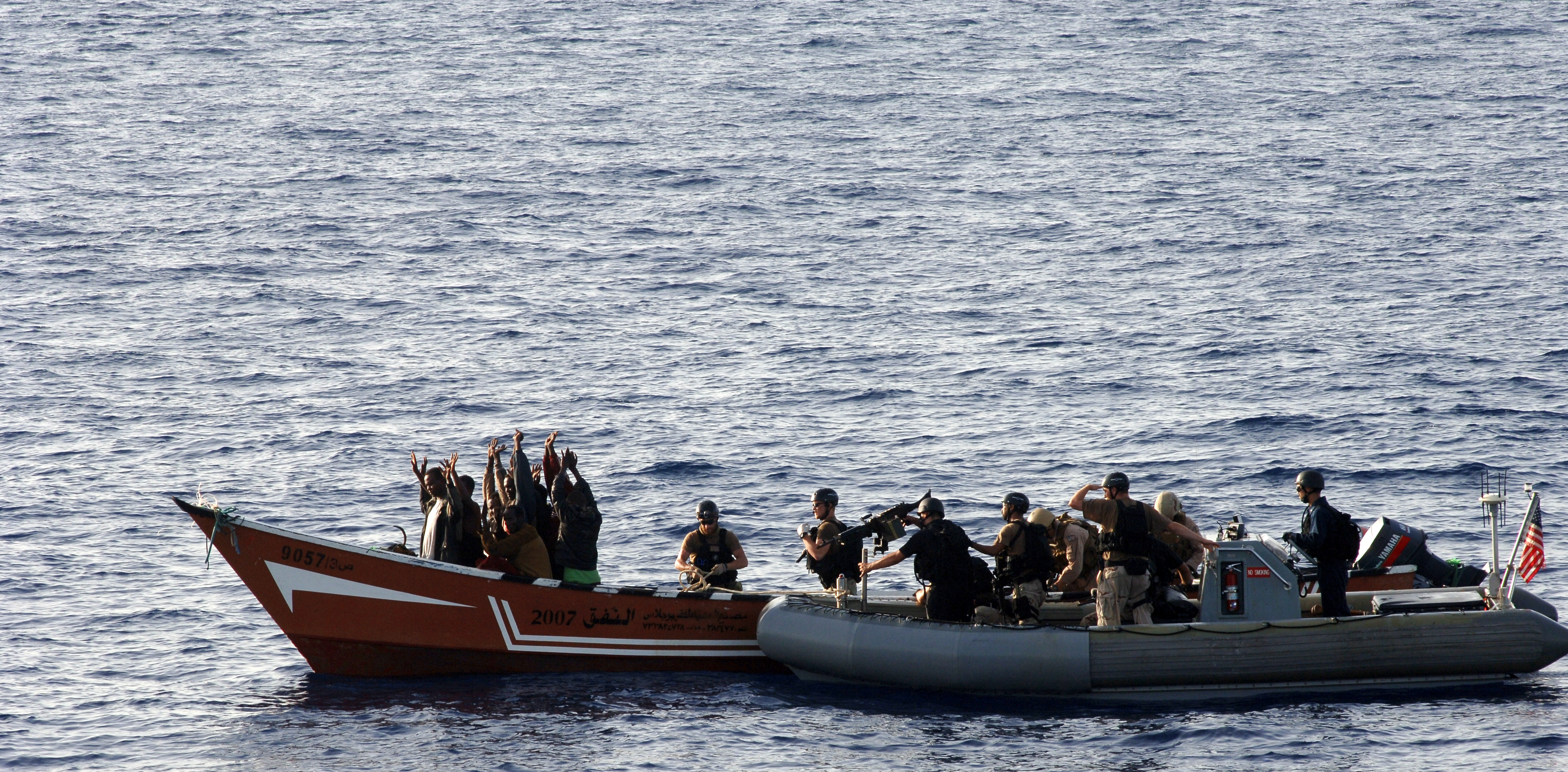
U.S. Coast Guard Tactical Law Enforcement, Detachment 406, and the visit, board, search and seizure team embarked aboard the guided-missile cruiser USS San Jacinto (CG 56) prepare to board and inspect a skiff suspected of participating in recent pirate activity. The USCG Deployable Operations Group was part of Combined Task Force 151

Pirate attacks off the vast coastline of Somalia declined from 236 in 2011 to two reportedly unsuccessful attacks in 2014, thanks to international counter-piracy cooperation efforts as well as armed guards now stationed on most large ships that traverse the region's waters. NATO has indicated that while it will be ending its mission in the Indian Ocean, the organization "will remain engaged in the fight against piracy by maintaining maritime situational awareness and continuing close links with other international organization's counter-piracy actors." NATO has been supporting international efforts to combat piracy in the Indian Ocean, as well as in the Gulf of Aden and off the Horn of Africa since 2008, at the request of the United Nations. It had been working alongside other missions including the European's Union's Operation Atalanta, the US-led Combined Task Force 151 and other individual countries such as China, Japan, and South Korea."

NATO's success in the area was due in part to the co-operation of other foreign states with interests in the region. A lot of these informal connections took place at SHADE (Shared Awareness and Deconfliction) meetings. These meetings allowed for shared tactics among a large number of international entities, including China, Japan, Russia, India and South Korea but is definitely not limited to them. With NATO promoting co-operation amongst these foreign entities, Operation Ocean Shield could effectively protect the area. They also utilized EUNAVFOR’s innovative electronic network called Mercury which shared anti-piracy tactics with other task forces and operations. Since this was an informal system, it wasn't weighed down with bureaucracy and could be spread amongst other coalitions and governmental organisations and could effectively help anyone that needed precise information in the area.

== Anti-piracy operations ==
On 10 January 2010, Admiral Pereira da Cunha, of the Portuguese Navy held a meeting regarding piracy with the Puntland coast guard. It was held aboard the frigate NRP Álvares Cabral near Bosaso, Somalia and focused on human intelligence gathering, capacity building and counter piracy co-operation between NATO and Puntland authorities.

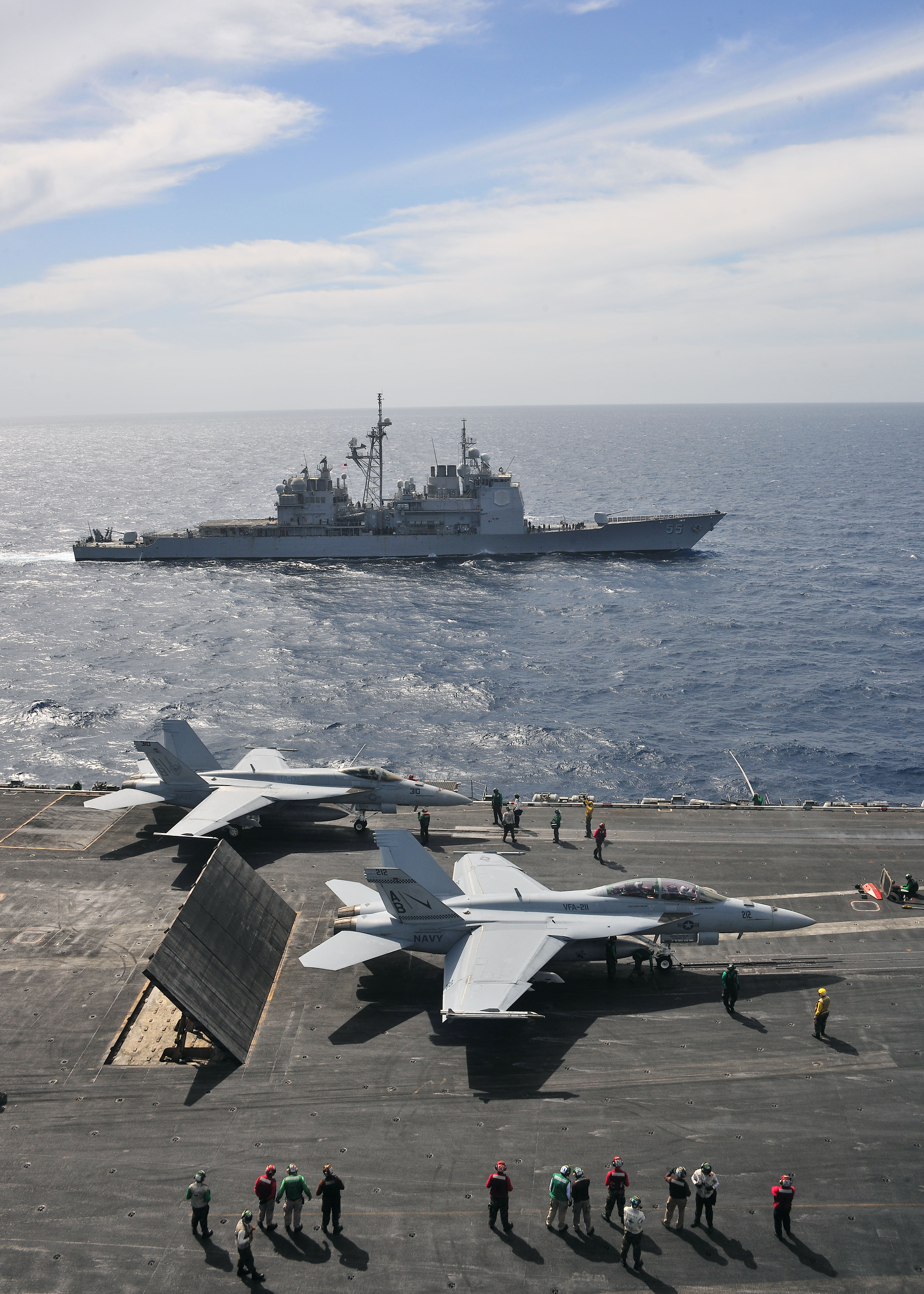
USS Leyte Gulf alongside USS Enterprise in the Red Sea in March 2011

Pirates attacked the Panamanian flagged merchantman MV Almezaan on 25 March. One pirate was killed by Almezaan's crew during the boarding, and shortly afterwards the Spanish Navy frigate Navarra arrived and launched a helicopter. Warning shots were then fired and the pirates surrendered without further conflict. Six pirates were taken prisoner for a short time before being released in two skiffs; the mother ship was sunk by gunfire.

The small Seychelles Coast Guard patrol boat Topaz engaged in another battle with pirates five days later on 30 March. While patrolling just off the coast of Somalia, Topaz encountered a captured dhow. After warning shots were fired, the dhow seemed to ignore the patrol boat and its occupants eventually opened up with rocket-propelled grenades and small arms fire. The Seychellois then engaged and after shooting off 10,000 rounds of machine gun fire, the dhow was burning and eventually sank. Twenty-seven members of the dhow's crew were rescued and the Topaz was returning to base when she was attacked by a trawler and two skiffs. Again the Seychellois responded with counter battery and the trawler exploded. One of the skiffs was sunk as well. Pirate casualties are unknown and one member of the dhow's crew was wounded.

The frigate USS Nicholas was attacked by small arms from a pirate skiff while steaming off the coast of Kenya and the islands of Seychelles. Nicholas returned fire with a 50-caliber deck gun and disabled the vessel and three pirates surrendered. Commander Mark Kesselring ordered the skiff sunk and proceeded to attack the nearby pirate mother ship from which the skiff was operating. After a chase the mothership was captured and two more pirates were taken into United States Navy custody. The pirate mothership was likely a small steam powered vessel fitted out as a naval trawler which are regularly used by Somali pirates. The ship was confiscated by the Americans according to news reports and pirates were put in Nicholas' brig, to await court either in Kenya or the United States.

That same day, the destroyer USS Farragut, as flagship of Combined Task Force 151, was involved in a pirate attack on a Sierra Leone-flagged tanker, MV Evita. The incident also occurred in waters north-west of the Seychelles. Evita was fired on by three skiffs but was able to escape and increase speed and due to her crew who shot flares at the rifle and rocket-propelled grenade-armed pirates. The attack was reported to the nearby USS Farragut which arrived in the battle area and began operations. The vessels were boarded by American personnel and a SH-60B Seahawk covered the mission from the air. The pirate mother skiff was sunk later on by gunfire or explosives and after the pirates were stripped of their means to commit piracy, they were loaded onto the other two skiffs and freed. Eleven pirates were captured in total. Several fuel drums and grappling hooks were found aboard the boats. The pirate weapons, ammunition and other equipment such as ladders were seen thrown overboard by the Americans before the pirates were captured. Nobody is believed to have been injured during the engagements.

The captured pirates from the first incident were detained by the United States Navy until it was determined that they would be transferred to the United States to stand trial for piracy. After capture, the pirates were identified as Mohammed Modin Hasan, Gabul Abdullahi Ali, Abdi Wali Dire, Abdi Mohammed Gurewardher, and Abdi Mohammed Umar. The five pirates, were put in the custody of the United States Marshal Service and charged with a variety of piracy and weapons related charges. The pirates were charged and tried in the United States District Court for the Eastern District of Virginia in Norfolk, Virginia where they were convicted and sentenced to serve in prison for life.

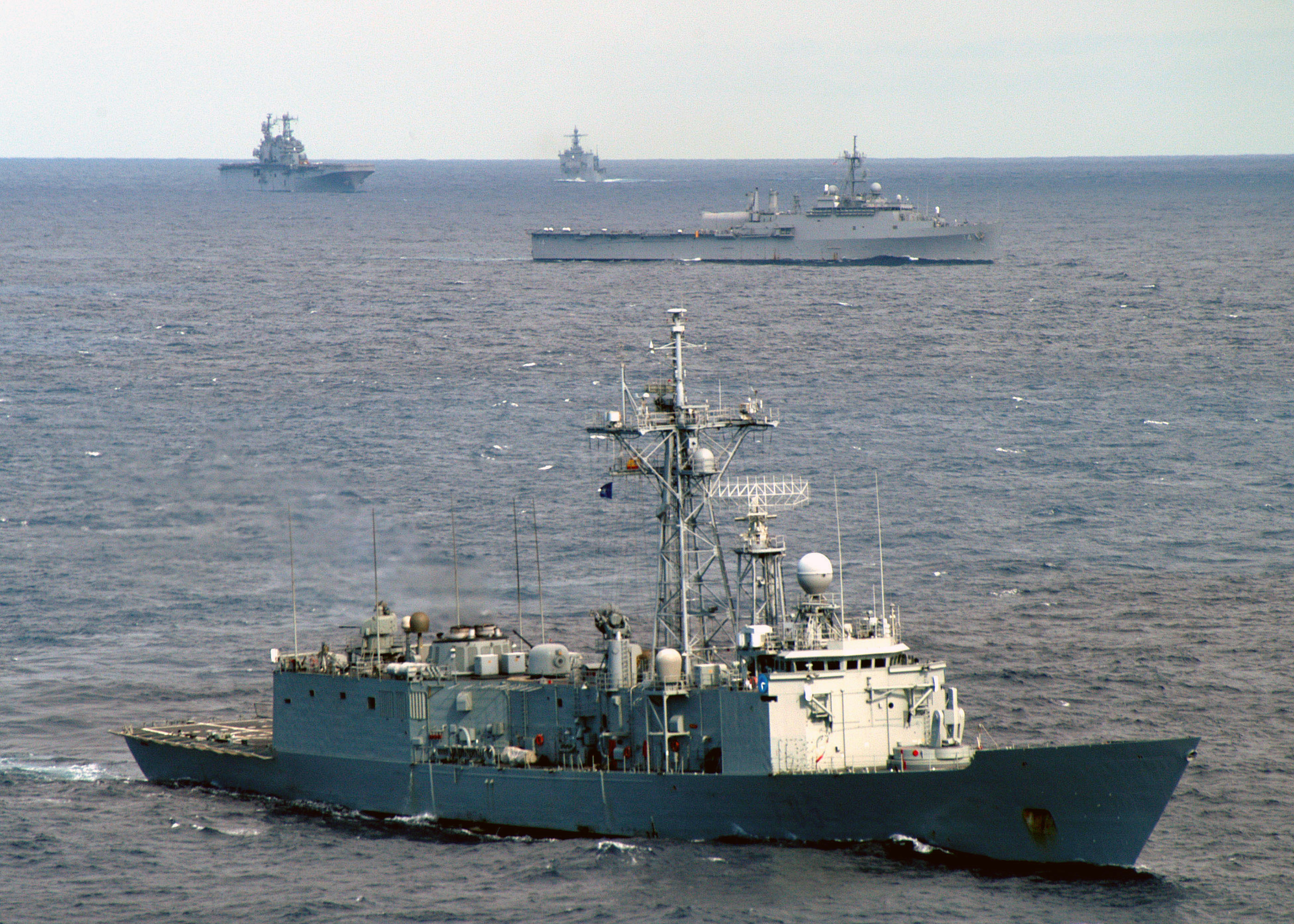
The Spanish frigate Navarra

Operation Dawn of Gulf of Aden was launched by Republic of Korea Navy Special Warfare Brigade commandos with support from Oman and the United States in January 2011. Following the capture of the Norwegian owned chemical tanker MV Samho Jewelry on 15 January off Muscat with its crew of twenty-one, a failed boarding action was carried out on 18 January which resulted in the wounding of three commandos. A second attempt on 21 January succeeded in freeing the ship and the captives while eight pirates were killed altogether.

A failed rescue operation was carried out by the Danish frigate HDMS Esbern Snare and a Seychellois Coast Guard patrol boat on 26 January. MV Beluga Nomination was taken over four days before, and the attackers cut into the freighter's citadel with a blow torch to get at the crew. The Seychelles patrol boat and Esbern Snare were dispatched and when they found the pirates, an engagement began. Boarding teams from the patrol boat were repulsed but the Seychellois were able to kill one or two of the pirates. Two of Beluga Nomination's crew managed to escape in a lifeboat and were rescued by the Danish though four others were killed either by drowning or the pirates. Ultimately the operation was aborted and the pirates sailed away with the tanker and seven remaining hostages.

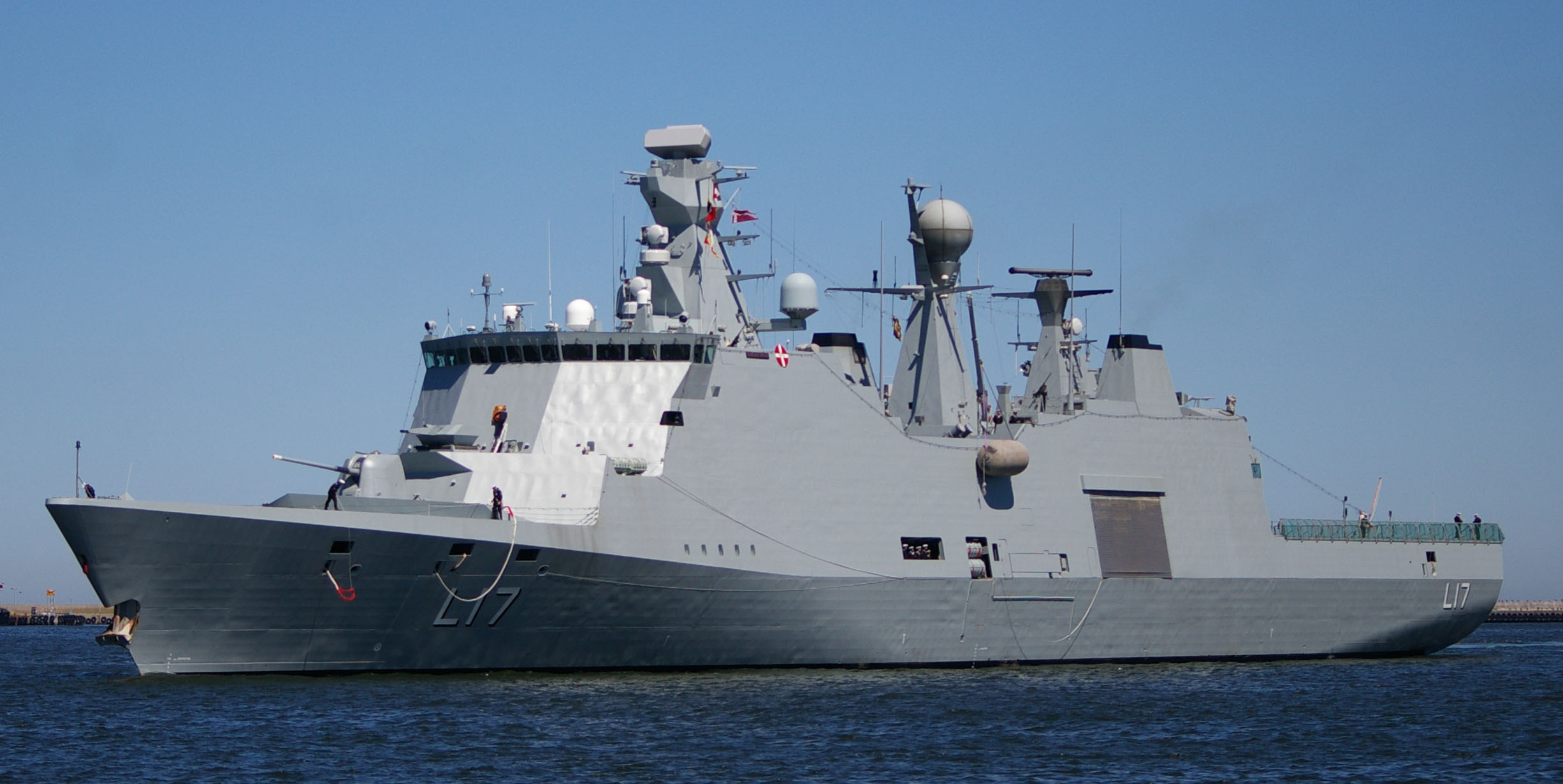
HDMS Esbern Snare

The Quest incident occurred in February 2011. In the first attack on an American private ship since the Maersk Alabama hijacking in 2009, the yacht SV Quest was taken over by nineteen pirates on 4 February. The United States Navy responded by dispatching the aircraft carrier USS Enterprise, the guided missile cruiser USS Leyte Gulf and the guided missile destroyers USS Bulkeley and USS Sterett to release the four captives. The ships found Quest on or about 21 February off the coast of Oman and negotiations to free the hostages began. However, on the following day, the pirates opened fire on USS Sterret with rocket-propelled grenades and shortly thereafter small arms fire was heard. The American commander then ordered a team to board the yacht and after doing so, all four of the prisoners were found to have been killed by the pirates. Fifteen pirates were taken into custody and two of them were killed in the boarding action. The bodies of two other pirates were also found, but American officials have no explanation for the cause of their deaths.

On 5 May 2011, as part of Operation Ocean Shield, the aircraft carrier USS Carl Vinson, the guided-missile cruiser USS Bunker Hill, and the Turkish frigate TCG Giresun responded to a distress call from the Panamanian-flagged, Chinese-owned bulk carrier MV Full City. An Indian Navy Tu-142 maritime patrol aircraft located Full City, and while TCG Giresun boarded the merchant vessel, USS Bunker Hill and its embarked helicopters intercepted a dhow believed to be the mother ship for the pirate attack. Bunker Hill's VBSS boarding party seized weapons and other equipment commonly used in piracy, and the boarding party also sank a small skiff being towed by the dhow. Giresun's boarding party found Full City's Chinese crew safe and in control of their ship.

== Piracy during the operation ==
NATO's vehicles have a specific mandate to provide protection and deterrence of piracy in its territorial waters. All members of NATO help make the operation a success via funding or through ships. NATO Allies provide ships and maritime patrol aircraft to NATO Standing Maritime Groups, which in turn assigns a number of ships, on a rotational basis, to Ocean Shield. "In January 2013, there were no attacks, approaches or disruptions in the area. In comparison, in January 2012, there were four pirate attacks in which all were unsuccessful. Additionally, out of 80 suspected pirates captured by counter piracy forces, 59 were captured by NATO ships. In January 2011, there were 29 attacks and six ships were captured." Arguably the operation has succeeded in decreasing piracy in the region while the task force was in power.

== Conclusion of Operation Ocean Shield ==
The conclusion of Operation Ocean Shield occurred on 16 December 2016. The final operation was led by Danish pilots in an attempt to map the Somali coastline and the gulf of Aden. The Danes' task was to map the inlets, camps and large cities of the coast for an intelligence report. "The detachment covered 1,800 km of coastline in which intelligence specialists reviewed and disseminated photographs and video files to produce the intelligence picture."

NATO is reallocating resources to the Mediterranean to deal with the immigrant crisis and human smuggling but believes that the efforts put into the Gulf of Aden will help stem the tide of returning piracy or prevent it altogether. As with the change in the political environment and world new problems have arisen where NATO has had to allocate resources. Therefore, it justifies the funding of the Mediterranean operation.

== Business sector regrowth ==
Through the use of the NATO shipping centre and the private sector, the Ocean Shield task force could effectively reduce the response time of counterattacks and spent less time having to warn businesses about potential threats in their shipping lanes. Through this coordination, the impact to the shipping industry was lessened; for instance, ships were not required to take indirect routes through other less safe international waters.

== Piracy attacks since the ending of Operation Ocean Shield ==
Piracy attacks have occurred since Operation Ocean Shield has ended. Gunmen hijacked the Aris 13, a small oil tanker, on 13 March 2017 and have demanded a ransom for the crew. Industrial shipping companies are trying to determine if there has been a resurgence in piracy activity in the region, or if it will be a rare occurrence, as this was the first case of Somali piracy in half a decade. More attempts to steal cargo via piracy occurred in 2017.

== Vessels deployed ==
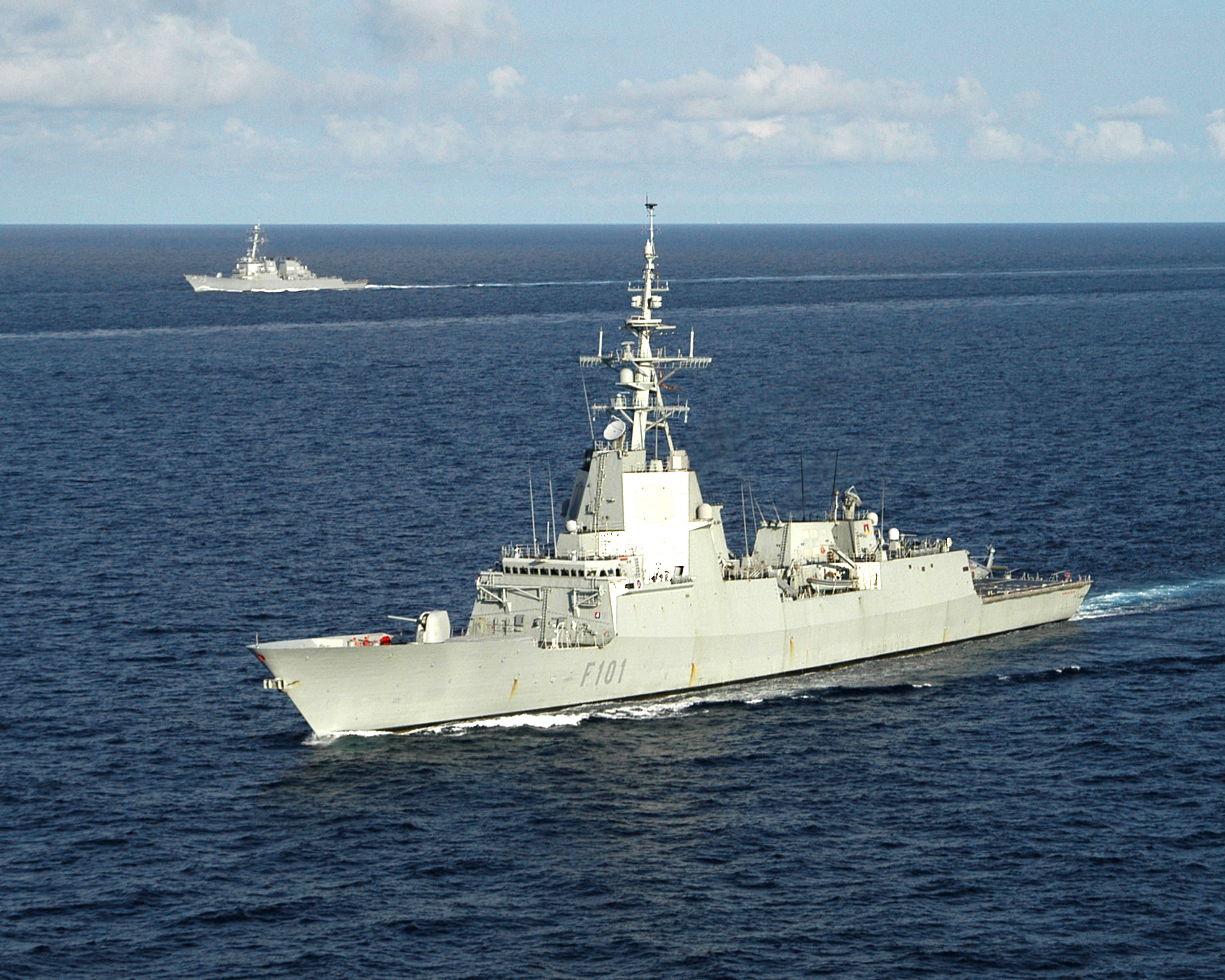
The Spanish frigate Álvaro de Bazán

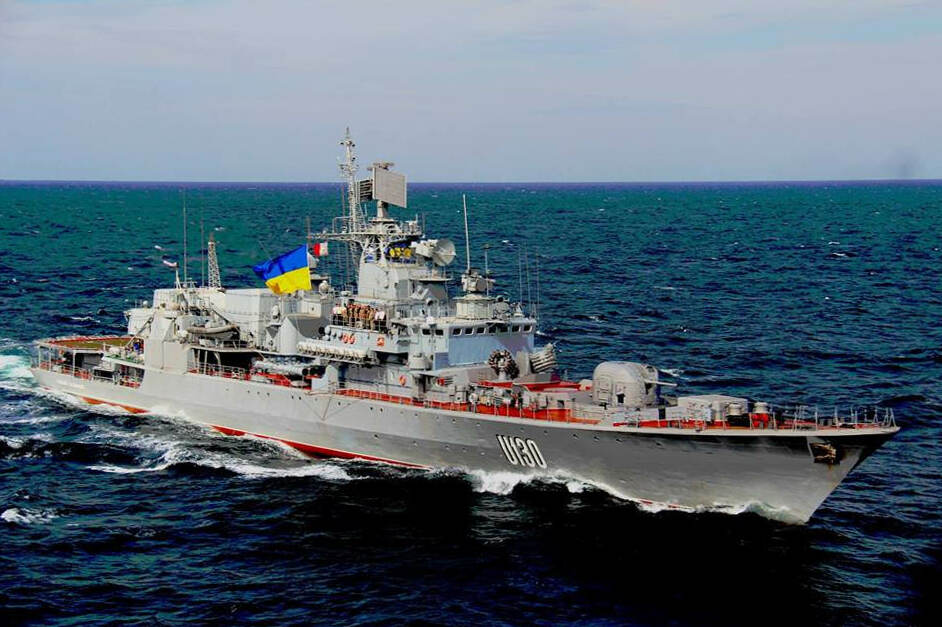
Ukrainian frigate Hetman Sahaydachniy

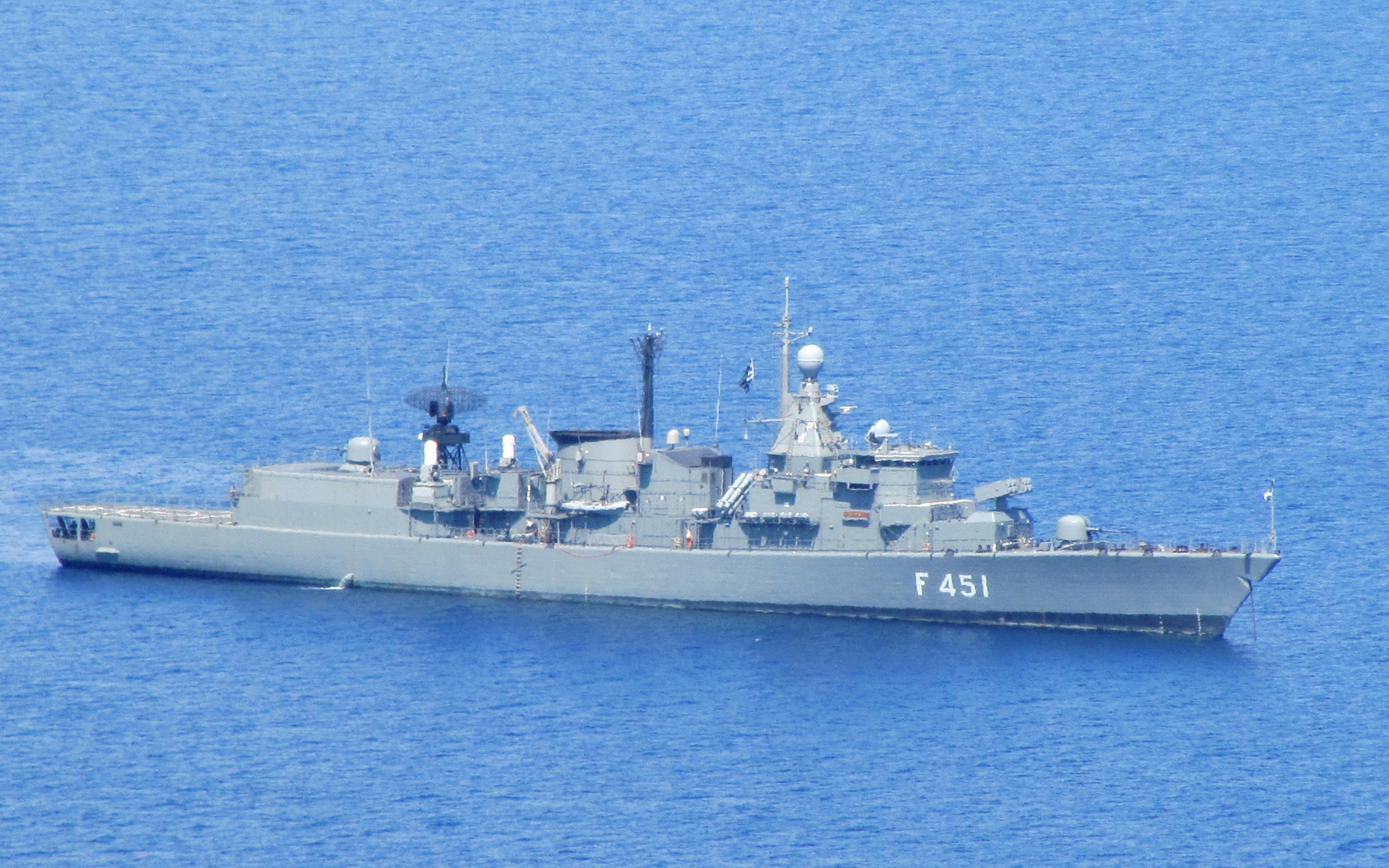
Greek frigate Limnos of the Hellenic Navy

Ship	Type	Branch
USS Enterprise (CVN-65)	aircraft carrier	USN
USS Carl Vinson (CVN-70)	aircraft carrier	USN
USS San Jacinto (CG-56)	guided missile cruiser	USN
USS Leyte Gulf (CG-55)	guided missile cruiser	USN
USS Bunker Hill (CG-52)	guided missile cruiser	USN
USS Farragut (DDG-99)	guided missile destroyer	USN
USS Bulkeley (DDG-84)	guided missile destroyer	USN
USS Sterett (DDG-104)	guided missile destroyer	USN
USS Donald Cook (DDG-75)	guided missile destroyer	USN
USS Laboon (DDG-58)	guided missile destroyer	USN
USS Bainbridge (DDG-96)	guided missile destroyer	USN
USS Stephen W. Groves (FFG-29)	guided missile frigate	USN
USS Kauffman (FFG-59)	guided missile frigate	USN
USS Nicholas (FFG-47)	guided missile frigate	USN
USS De Wert (FFG-45)	guided missile frigate	USN
KD Sri Indera Sakti	flexible support ship	RMN
Bunga Mas Lima	auxiliary ship	RMN
HNoMS Fridtjof Nansen (F310)	Multi-role Frigate	RNoN
HMS Cornwall (F99)	frigate	RN
HMS Chatham (F87)	frigate	RN
HMS Montrose (F236)	frigate	RN
HMNZS Te Mana (F111)	frigate	RNZN
HDMS Esbern Snare (L17)	flexible support ship	RDN
HDMS Absalon (L16)	flexible support ship	RDN
HDMS Iver Huitfeldt (F361)	frigate	RDN
HNLMS Rotterdam (L800)	Landing Platform Dock	RNN
HNLMS Tromp (F803)	frigate	RNN
HNLMS Zeeleeuw (S803)	submarine	RNN
HTMS Pattani (511)	Offshore patrol vessel	RTN
HTMS Naratiwat (512)	Offshore patrol vessel	RTN
HTMS Similan (871)	Replenishment ship	RTN
Bersagliere (F 584)	frigate	MM
Libeccio (F 572)	frigate	MM
ROKS Chungmugong Yi Sun-sin (DDH-975)	destroyer	ROKN
ROKS Choi Young (DDH-981)	destroyer	ROKN
INS Tabar (F44)	frigate	IN
INS Mysore (D60)	destroyer	IN
INS Tir (A86)	training ship	IN
INS Kalpeni	fast attack craft	IN
INS Cankarso	fast attack craft	IN
HMCS Fredericton (FFH 337)	frigate	RCN
NRP Vasco da Gama (F330)	frigate	MP
NRP Dom Francisco de Almeida (F334)	frigate	MP
Álvaro de Bazán (F101)	frigate	Spanish Navy
Navarinon (F-461)	frigate	HN
Limnos (F-451)	frigate	HN
TCG Giresun (F 491)	frigate	TN
PNS Babur (D182)	frigate	PN
PLANS Hengyang (FFG-568)	guided missile frigate	PLAN
PLANS Chaohu (AEFS-890)	Replenishment Ship	PLAN
JS Samidare (DD-106)	destroyer	MSDF
JS Sazanami (DD-113)	destroyer	MSDF
JS Umigiri (DD-158)	destroyer	MSDF
Hetman Sahaydachniy (U130)	frigate	VMSU
ARC 7 de Agosto (47)	offshore patrol vessel	ARC

In addition to the frigate HNoMS Fridtjof Nansen (F310), Norway has previously had a Lockheed P-3 Orion involved in the operation.

== See also ==
- Combined Task Force 151 – multinational force in the area
- Operation Atalanta – EU force in the area
- Piracy in the Strait of Malacca
- Piracy in the Gulf of Guinea
- Piracy on Falcon Lake
- Italian Military Support Base in Djibouti
