= List of ships named Buccaneer =

A number of ships have been named Buccaneer, after corsairs and privateers.

- RFA Buccaneer, a steam stores carrier in service 1916–1921, built in 1890
- USS Buccaneer, an armed yacht which served in 1898
- MV Buccaneer (1925), an excursion boat at Chicago, formerly USCGC Dexter
- MV Buccaneer (1927), a Norwegian oil tanker in service 1937–1942
- HMT Buccaneer, an Admiralty Brigand-class fleet tug, launched in 1937
- HMAS Buccaneer, an Australian navy patrol boat, launched in 1968
- MV Buccaneer (1981), an Italian tug seized by pirates in 2009
