= Zodiac Maritime =

Shipping company

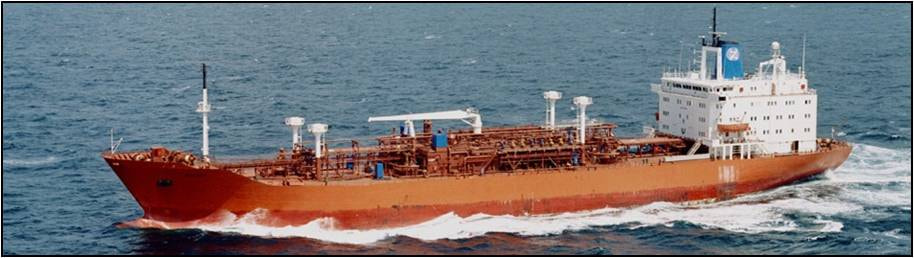
In August 2018, ZM-owned LPG ship

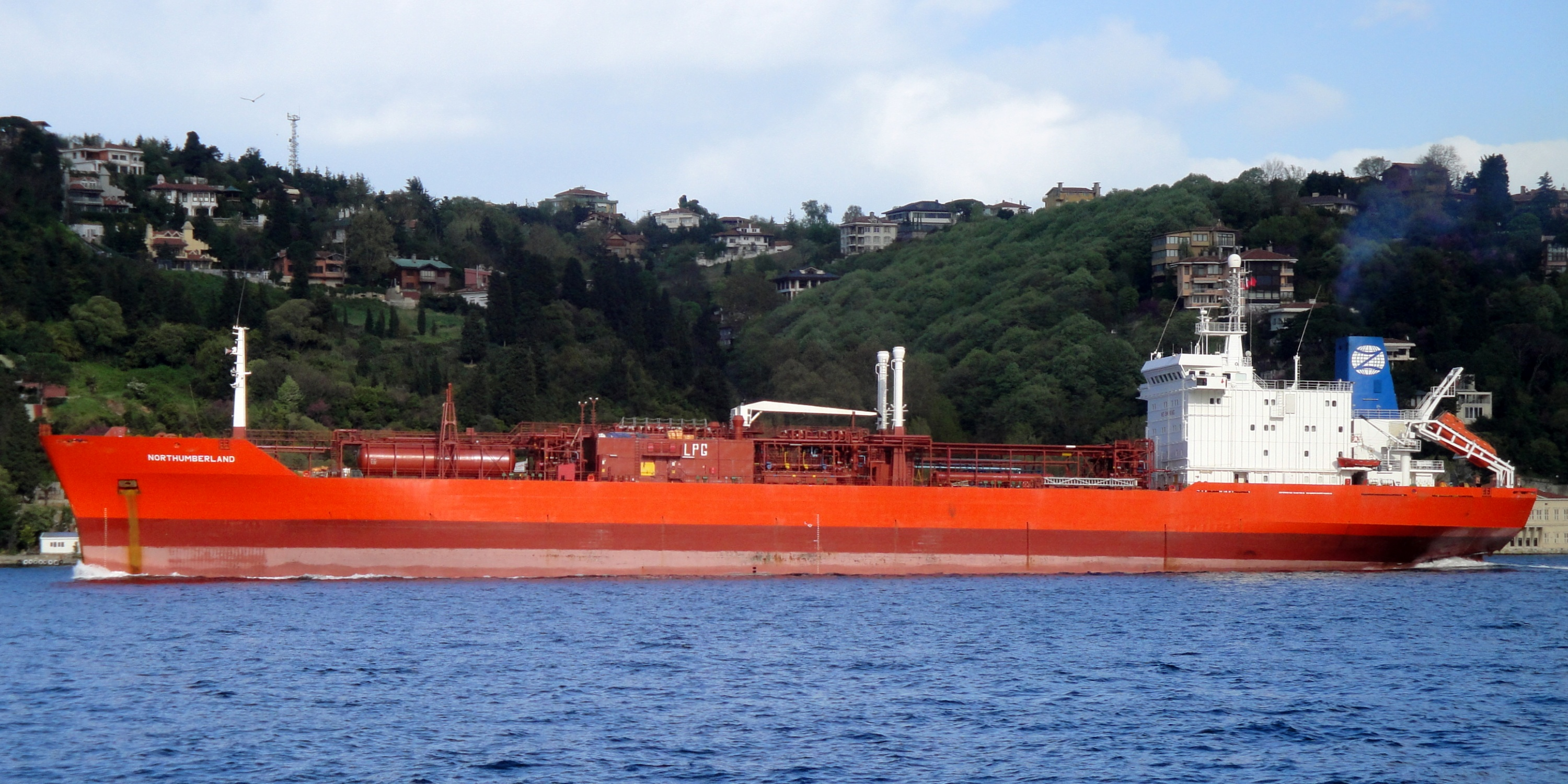
Zodiac operated LPG tanker Northumberland

Zodiac Maritime Ltd is an international ship management company that owns and charters out large vessels. It is part of Ofer Global based in Monaco and chaired by Eyal Ofer. It has a long-standing business relationship with Mediterranean Shipping Company.

== History ==
According to a 2014 analysis conducted by Globes, the companies of the Zodiac group generated together an operating profit of just over $1.5 billion in 2003–12, with an operating profit margin of 39%, and a 0.49% tax rate on profits.

In July 2014, Eyal Ofer, the principal of Zodiac Group, received an honorary life membership of the Baltic Exchange for his contribution to shipping in the UK and global maritime trade. Later that year, he was named in the top 10 most influential people in the shipping industry according to Lloyds List 2014.

=== Ship attacks ===
On 2 January 2010, the MV Asian Glory was hijacked by pirates 1,000 km off the Horn of Africa. In late 2009 and early 2010, two of its ships (St James Park and MV Asian Glory) were captured by Somali pirates.

In 2012, ZM owned the MSC Napoli, the container ship that ran into difficulty in the English Channel.

Iran has persistently attacked various vessels and seized ships amidst political issues since 2019, and has targeted Zodiac Marine, the UK's largest ship owner.

On 29 July 2021, the oil tanker MT Mercer Street, managed by Zodiac, while travelling from Tanzania to the United Arab Emirates (UAE) with no cargo on board, was attacked off the coast of Oman. The US military announced that the drone had been produced in Iran.

In November 2023, amid the Gaza war, the Central Park, a tanker ship owned by Zodiac Maritime, was attacked in the Gulf of Aden by suspected Somali pirates.

On 13 April 2024, the IRGC Navy seized Portuguese-flagged container ship MSC Aries in the Gulf of Oman off the Emirati port city of Fujairah, steering the container ship through the Strait of Hormuz. on the pretext of carrying harmful items, then "accused of having ties to Israel", detaining the ship's crew. MSC Aries is leased by MSC from Gortal Shipping Inc., which is an affiliate of Zodiac. In October 2025, Iran demanded a $170 million fine from Zodiac to release the ship.
