= MSC Aries =

Container ship

History

Portugal
- Name: MSC Aries
- Owner: Gortal Shipping
- Operator: Mediterranean Shipping Company
- Port of registry: Madeira, Portugal
- Completed: 2020
- Identification: IMO number: 9857169; MMSI number: 255806335

General characteristics
- Type: Container ship
- Tonnage: 149,525 GT
- Length: 366 m (1,200 ft 9 in)
- Beam: 51 m (167 ft 4 in)

MSC Aries is a container ship built in 2020. The ship is Portuguese-registered and Madeira-flagged.

On 13 April 2024, Iran seized MSC Aries, owned by Gortal Shipping and leased to Mediterranean Shipping Company (MSC), which Iran claimed was linked to Israel. The ship, with a crew of 25 people, was boarded by Iranian commandos in the Strait of Hormuz, within international waters off the coast of the United Arab Emirates, and taken to Iranian waters, effectively imprisoning the crew.

The United States, United Kingdom, and Portugal (where the ship is registered) called for the ship's release immediately afterwards. On 3 May 2024, Iran released the crew, but retained control of the vessel.

== Description ==
She has a length of 366 metres (1,200 ft 9 in) and a beam of 51 metres (167 ft 4 in). It has a 149,525 gross tonnage (GT) and a summer tonnage of 158,097 tons deadweight (DWT).

The ship is leased from Gortal Shipping Inc., a British Virgin Islands affiliate of Zodiac Maritime, and operated by Mediterranean Shipping Company (MSC). The Iranian foreign ministry claimed that the ship was undoubtedly linked to Israel, as Zodiac is partially owned by an Israeli businessman.

== 2024 Iranian seizure of the MSC Aries ==
On the morning of 13 April 2024, Iran's Revolutionary Guards boarded and took control of MSC Aries via helicopter, claiming that it had violated maritime law. The seizure of the ship occurred in international waters near the UAE coast. The Israeli foreign minister called the Iranian action an act of international piracy, in alignment with international law. The Iranian military subsequently took the ship and its crew to Iranian waters. The 25 crew members onboard comprised 17 Indians, four Filipinos, two Pakistanis, one Russian and one Estonian national.

Following the incident, the Israeli foreign minister Israel Katz called on the European Union to sanction the IRGC. Joe Biden shortened his vacation and returned to the White House for "security consultations," and defence secretary Lloyd Austin called the Israeli defence minister, Yoav Gallant, and said Israel can rely on the United States. On 18 April 2024, 16 shipping associations sent a joint letter to the United Nations requesting every effort to release the captive crew of MSC Aries, and for "enhanced military presence, missions and patrols in the region to protect seafarers".

On 27 April 2024, the Iranian Foreign Minister Hossein Amirabdollahian announced that the 24 remaining crew of MSC Aries being held were given access to their respective consulates, and would be released. On 3 May 2024, he announced that the crew was released, but the vessel remained under the control of Iran.

== See also ==
- April 2024 Iranian strikes against Israel
- Iranian seizure of the tanker Talara
- 2024 Iran–Israel conflict
