= Italian Military Support Base in Djibouti =

Italian military base in Djibouti

The Italian Military Support Base in Djibouti, established in 2013 through a bilateral agreement, is involved in counter-terrorism and maritime operations. Its primary functions include monitoring commercial traffic and addressing piracy in the Horn of Africa, Gulf of Aden, and Indian Ocean. The base serves as a logistical hub for military operations and facilitates personnel movements and operations in Somalia.

== History ==
Italy's military presence in the Horn of Africa, centered at the 'Amedeo Guillet' base in Djibouti, reflects its regional strategy and historical connections with former colonies such as Somalia, Ethiopia, and Eritrea. The base accommodates up to 300 personnel and plays a role in regional security operations.

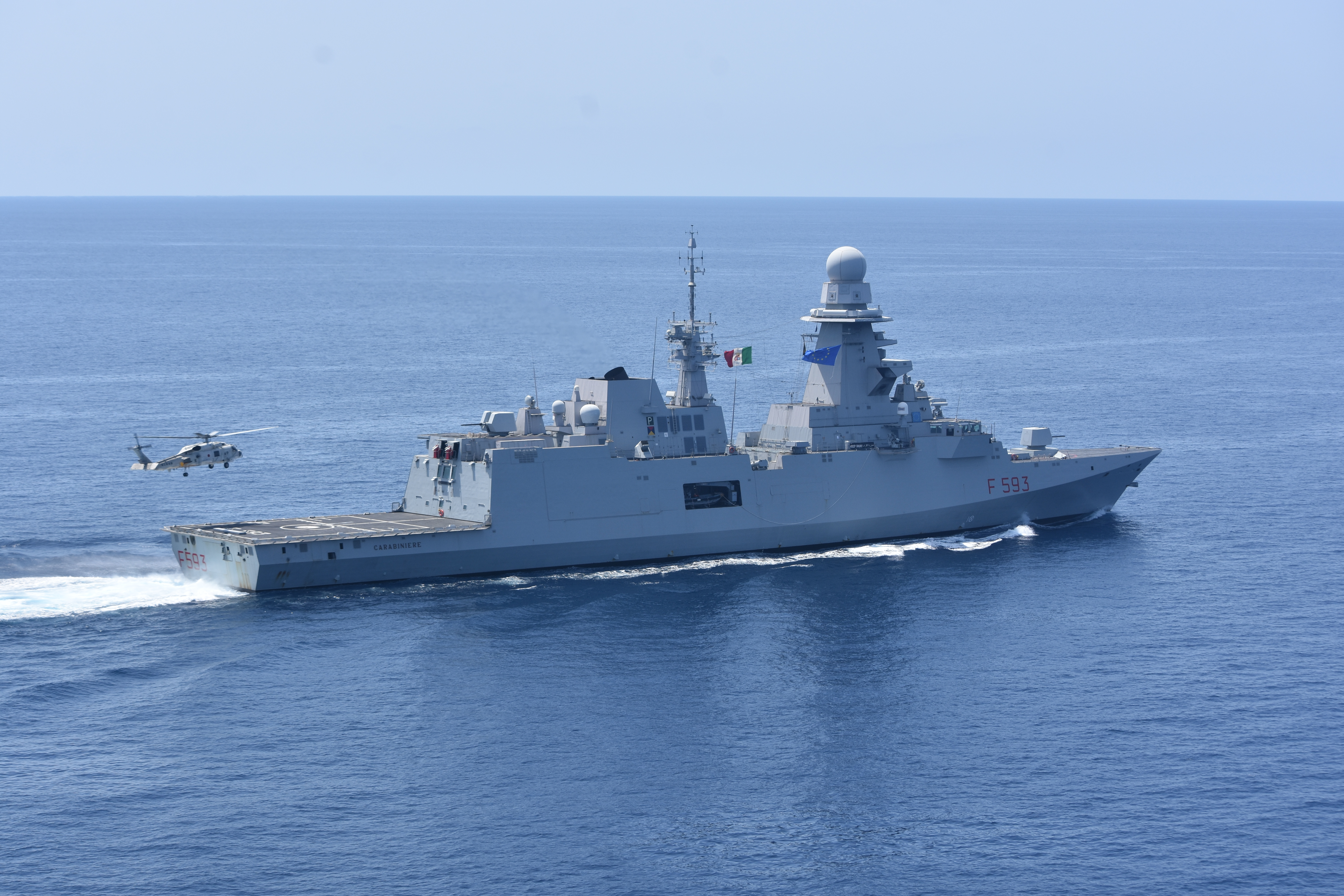
Italian Navy ship Carabiniere patrolling the waters off the coast of Somalia as part of Operation Atalanta in May 2021.

== International Cooperation ==
Italy participated in NATO's counter-piracy operations in the Horn of Africa through Operation Ocean Shield from 2009 to 2016. Italian naval vessels, including the ITS Mimbelli and ITS San Marco, were engaged in this mission to deter and disrupt piracy in the Gulf of Aden, Indian Ocean, and off the coast of Somalia. Italy's contributions included naval escorts for humanitarian aid shipments and participation in actions to prevent pirate hijackings.

Additionally, Italy participates in the European Union's maritime security operations in Djibouti. The Italian ship Fasan is involved in Operation Aspides, focusing on intercepting threats such as drones in the Red Sea. This operation forms part of the EU’s broader efforts to secure maritime routes in the region.

== See also ==
- Anti-piracy
- Operation Ocean Shield
- Djibouti Armed Forces
- Operation Atalanta
