= Spanish frigate Navarra =

Spanish Navy Santa María-class frigate commissioned in 1994

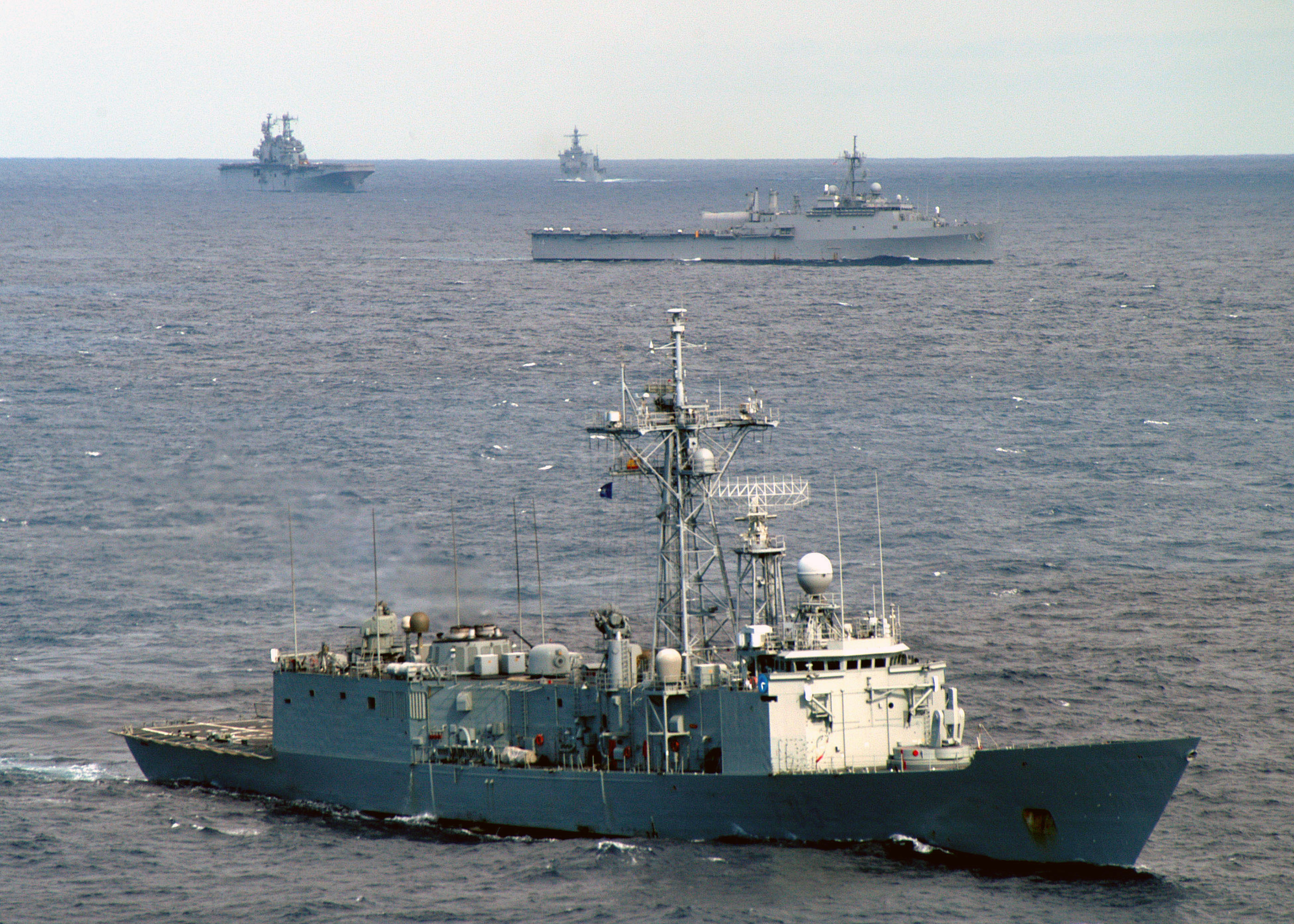
- Navarra on 25 September 2004

History

Spain
- Name: Navarra
- Namesake: Navarra
- Builder: Bazan
- Laid down: 15 April 1991
- Launched: 23 October 1992
- Commissioned: 30 May 1994
- Home port: Rota
- Identification: MMSI number: 224972000; Pennant number: F85
- Status: in active service

General characteristics
- Class & type: Santa Maria-class frigate
- Displacement: 3,160 t (3,110 long tons) standard
- Length: 138.8 m (455 ft 5 in)
- Beam: 14.3 m (46 ft 11 in)
- Draught: 6.6 m (21 ft 8 in) max
- Propulsion: 2 × General Electric LM2500-30 gas turbines generating 41,000 shp (31 MW) through a single shaft and variable pitch propeller; 2 × Auxiliary Propulsion Units, 350 hp (260 kW) retractable electric azimuth thrusters for maneuvering and docking.
- Speed: 29 knots (54 km/h; 33 mph)
- Complement: 223
- Sensors & processing systems: Radar: AN/SPS-49(V)4 2-D air search ((V)5 in F-85 & F-86), RAN-12L (being replaced by RAN-30) 2-D low horizon air search radar for Meroka, SPS-55 surface search radar, Mk 92 fire control system, Sonar: SQS-56, SQR-19(V) Towed Array (-19(V)2 in F-85 & F-86), Fire control: Mk 13 weapons control, Mk 92 and SPG-60 STIR missile control, SQQ-89 ASW
- Electronic warfare & decoys: Nettunel (F-85 & F-86: Mk-3000) intercept, SLQ-25 Nixie, Mk36 SROC decoy launchers
- Armament: 1 × single-arm Mk 13 Missile Launcher with a 40-round magazine that can handle 32 SM-1MR anti-air/ship missiles and 8 Harpoon anti-ship missiles; 2 × triple Mark 32 ASW torpedo tubes with Mark 46 Mod 5 anti-submarine torpedoes; 1 × OTO Melara 76 mm/62 cal. naval gun; 1 × 20 mm Meroka 12-barrel CIWS system
- Aircraft carried: 2 × Sikorsky SH-60B Seahawk LAMPS III helicopters

Navarra (F85) is the fifth of the six Spanish-built Santa Maria-class frigates of the Spanish Navy, which are based on the American Oliver Hazard Perry-class design. The vessel was constructed by Bazan (now Navantia) and launched on 23 October 1992 and commissioned on 27 May 1994. The Santa Maria-class frigates provide anti-submarine and anti-air defence for the Spanish Navy.

== Design and description ==
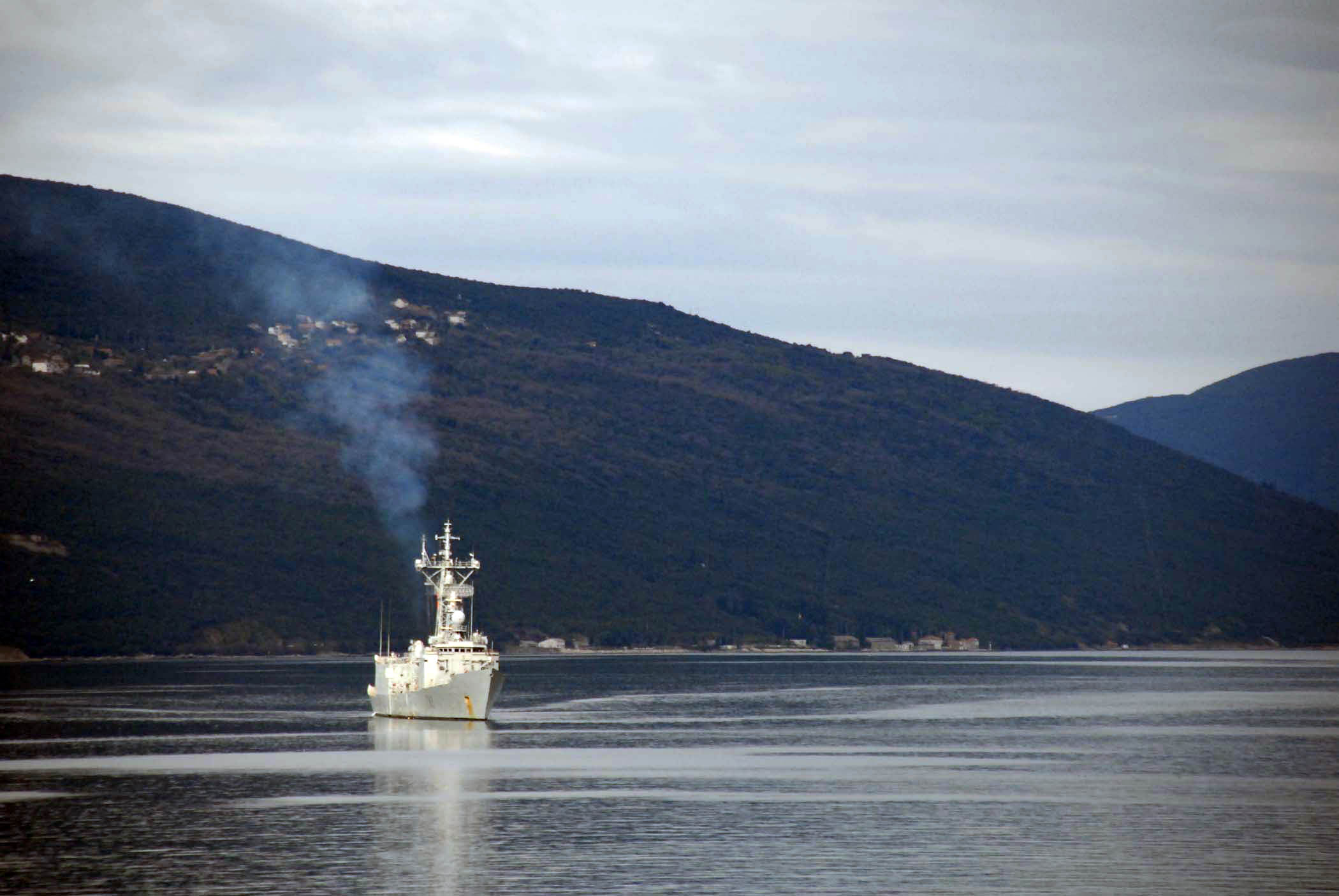
Navarra on 31 March 2007

The Santa María class are a series of six guided missile frigates based on the American Oliver Hazard Perry class. The Oliver Hazard Perry class had been conceived as a way to reduce unit costs while maintaining an anti-air warfare (AAW) platform with anti-submarine (ASW) and anti-surface warfare capabilities. The Oliver Hazard Perry class came in two forms, the short-hulled and long-hulled, with the Santa María class being of the later with additional beam to allow for more top weight for future modifications. The class came in two batches, with the first four being of batch one and the final two of the second. The first batch of ships have a displacement of 2,851 tonnes (2,806 long tons) light, 3,160 t (3,110 long tons) standard and 4,017 t (3,954 long tons) at full load. The second batch have the same light and standard displacements, with a full load displacement of 4,107 t (4,042 long tons). The frigates measure 138.8 metres (455 ft 5 in) long overall and 125.9 m (413 ft 1 in) at the waterline with a beam of 14.3 m (46 ft 11 in) and a standard draught of 4.52 m (14 ft 10 in) and a maximum draught at the sonar dome of 6.6 m (21 ft 8 in). The ships have a complement of 223 sailors including 13 officers.

The Santa María class is propelled by a controllable pitch propeller powered by two General Electric LM2500 gas turbines creating 41,000 shaft horsepower (31,000 kW), giving the vessels a maximum speed of 29 knots (54 km/h; 33 mph). The frigates stow 587 t (578 long tons; 647 short tons) of fuel and have a range of 5,000 nautical miles (9,300 km; 5,800 mi) at 18 knots (33 km/h; 21 mph) or 4,500 nmi (8,300 km; 5,200 mi) at 20 knots (37 km/h; 23 mph). The ships have four 1,000 kW Kato-Allison 114-DOOL diesel generator sets creating a total of 4,000 kW. These can power two 260 kW (350 shp) retractable, rotatable auxiliary propulsion motors. The vessels have fin stabilisers fitted.

=== Armament and sensors ===
Frigates of the Santa María class are armed with a single-armed Mk 13 missile launcher serviced by a 40-round magazine that can handle 32 SM-1MR anti-air/ship missiles and 8 Harpoon anti-ship missiles. The Harpoon missiles have a range of 50 nmi (93 km; 58 mi) at Mach 0.9 carrying a 227-kilogram (500 lb) warhead. The SM-1R missiles have a range of 20.5 nmi (38.0 km; 23.6 mi) at Mach 2. The vessels also mount a single OTO Melara 76-millimetre (3.0 in)/62 calibre naval gun capable of firing 85 rounds per minute up to 8.7 nmi (16.1 km; 10.0 mi) with each shell carrying a 6 kg (13 lb) warhead. (Note: /62 refers to the length of the gun in terms of calibres. A /62 gun is 62 times long as its bore diameter.) For AAW defence, the ships mount a single Meroka 20 mm (0.79 in)/120 12-barrelled close-in weapons system (CIWS) capable of firing 3,600 rounds per minute up to 2 km (1.2 mi). For ASW, the frigates are armed with two triple-mounted Mark 32 torpedo tubes for Mod 5 Mark 46 torpedoes.

The vessels are equipped with AN/SPS-49(V)5 2-D air search radar, RAN-12L (being replaced by RAN-30) 2-D low horizon air search radar for the Meroka CIWS, SPS-55 surface search radar and a Mk 92 fire-control radar. For ASW, the ships have SQS-56 sonar, SQR-19(V)2 towed array. For weapons fire control, they have Mk 13 weapons control, Mk 92 and SPG-60 STIR missile control, SQQ-89 ASW systems. For electronic warfare they have Nettunel Mk-3000 intercept, a SLQ-25 Nixie towed torpedo decoy, and Mk36 SROC decoy launchers.

=== Aircraft ===
As long-hulled versions of the Oliver Hazard Perry class, the Santa María-class frigates have twin hangars to accommodate up to two Sikorsky SH-60B Seahawk Light Airborne Multi-Purpose System (LAMPS) III helicopters though only one is usually embarked. The helicopter deck, located aft, is equipped with the RAST helicopter deck-handling system designed to handle LAMPS helicopters.

== Construction and career ==
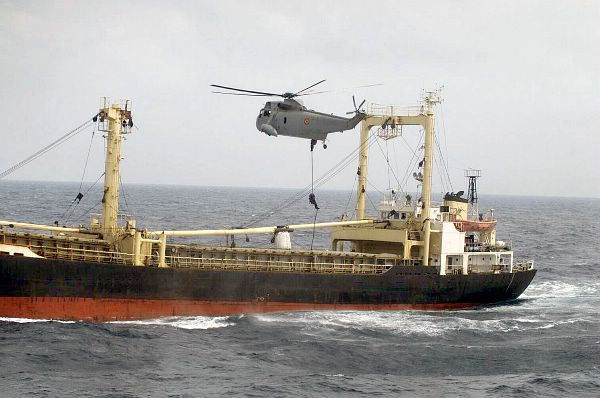
So San assault

The frigate was one of the final pair of hulls ordered on 26 December 1989. The keel was laid down on 15 April 1991 by Izar (now Navantia) at Ferrol, Spain. Navarra was launched on 23 October 1992 and commissioned on 30 May 1994. Navarra was given the pennant number F85 and assigned to the 41 Escort Squadron based at Rota, Spain. The Santa Maria-class frigates were tasked with escorting the aircraft carrier Príncipe de Asturias.

On 9 December 2002, Navarra intercepted the unflagged freighter So San several hundred miles southeast of Yemen at the request of the United States government, possibly associated in some fashion with the U.S. Proliferation Security Initiative. The frigate fired across So San's bow after the freighter ignored hails and attempted to evade the frigate. The freighter's crew was North Korean; 23 containers containing 15 complete Scud ballistic missiles, 15 high-explosive warheads, and 23 nitric acid containers were found on board. Yemen claimed ownership of the shipment and protested the interception and U.S. officials released the vessel after receiving assurances that the missiles would not be transferred to a third party.

On 23 March 2010, she sank a Somali pirate mothership lifeboat and captured two skiffs, after private security forces successfully defended MV Almezaan from a pirate attack. The six suspected pirates were later released, when the master and crew of Almezaan refused to testify.

In November 2016, while patrolling off the Libyan coast as part of the EUNAVFOR's Operation Sophia, the frigate recovered 227 migrants from inflatable boats in the Mediterranean Sea.

In September 2025, the ship's visit to Port Victoria, Seychelles coincided with the visit of the First Training Squadron (1TS) of the Indian Navy. The 1TS included INS Tir, INS Shardul and ICGS Sarathi. This resulted in professional interactions were undertaken among the crew of the navies.
