= Horizon-1 =

Ship built in 1980

History
- Name: Horizon-1
- Owner: Horizon Denizcilik İç ve Dış Ticaret A.Ş., Istanbul, Turkey
- Operator: Horizon Denizcilik İç ve Dış Ticaret A.Ş., Istanbul, Turkey
- Port of registry: Istanbul, Turkey
- Builder: Stocznia Gdynia Group, Gdynia, Poland
- Yard number: b515/5
- Launched: 31 July 1979
- Completed: 1980
- Identification: IMO number: 7625732
- Fate: Broken up 6 February 2011

General characteristics
- Tonnage: 21,630 GT; 11,686 NT (net tonnage); 33,693 DWT
- Length: 176.72 m (579 ft 9 in) Length overall; 169.23 m (555 ft 3 in) LBP
- Beam: 27.51 m (90 ft 3 in) (extreme); 27.45 m (90 ft 1 in) (moulded)
- Draught: 11.48 m (37 ft 8 in)
- Depth: 15.80 m (51 ft 10 in)
- Propulsion: 1 fixed pitched solid propeller
- Speed: 15 knots (28 km/h; 17 mph)
- Crew: 23

Horizon-1 was a dry bulk cargo ship owned and operated by the Istanbul based Turkish company Horizon Denizcilik İç ve Dış Ticaret A.Ş. (Horizon Maritime Trading Co.).

On July 8, 2009, the ship was captured by Somali pirates in the Gulf of Aden. At the time of the seizure, the Horizon-1's crew consisted of 23 Turks including a female third officer. The vessel had experienced a hijacking attempt on March 19 the same year in that area.

== Hijacking ==
On March 19, 2009, the Horizon-1 was harassed on its way from Ukraine to China in the Gulf of Aden by Somali pirates as she witnessed the hijacking of the Greek-owned vessel Titan. The captain alerted naval forces, which were patrolling in the area. The attack on Horizon-1 was prevented by the appearance of the naval forces.

In the morning of July 10, 2009 at 08:29 EEST (05:29 UTC), the Horizon-1 was attacked again in the Gulf of Aden and hijacked by five armed pirates. She was carrying 33,000 tons of dry sulfur from Saudi Arabia to Jordan. As reported by the Turkish Navy, the vessel was brought first to the Somali port of Hordio, where she moored on July 9 at around 09:00 EEST (6:00 UTC). Turkish frigates TCG Gaziantep and TCG Gediz stood by in the vicinity. On July 10, the Horizon-1 left Hordio and sailed to the so-called pirate haven of Eyl in 60 nmi (110 km; 69 mi) distance southwards, cruising at low speed for unknown reason.

At the time of the incident, the vessel's crew consisted of 23 Turks including the 24-year-old, female third officer Aysun Akbay, a graduate of Black Sea Technical University's Department of Deck at Sürmene Faculty of Marine Sciences. Contacted by phone, she reported that "all the crew members are alive and unharmed, resting in their cabins and their food is not confiscated".

While the ship's owner gave permission to the Turkish Navy for freeing the vessel and her crew by forced intervention, the Turkish government rejected this option due to lack of procedures in case of getting hold of the pirates. The Turkish officials rather preferred to contact Kenyan authorities for legal assistance, who have more experience in handling pirates from Somalia.

== Release ==
The vessel was released with its crew on October 5, 2009 at 17:30 local time against a ransom of US$2,750,000 paid by a British mediator.

== Ship's register ==
- Bergo since June 12, 1990
- Dyvi Atlantic since May 19, 1998
- Norhaven since December 19, 2001
- Fauna F. since January 18, 2003
- Athina since October 2, 2007
