= MV Asian Glory =

UK flagged automobile transport ship

History
- Name: Asian Glory
- Owner: Zodiac Maritime Ltd
- Operator: EUKOR
- Port of registry: United Kingdom
- Builder: Hyundai Heavy Industries, Ulsan, South Korea
- Launched: 30 July 1994
- Completed: 1994
- Identification: IMO number: 9070474
- Status: In service
- Notes: Hijacked 1 January 2010; released 11 June 2010

General characteristics
- Type: Pure car/truck carrier
- Tonnage: 44,818 GT; 13,363 DWT
- Length: 184.1 m (604 ft)
- Beam: 30.6 m (100 ft)
- Draught: 8.8 m (29 ft)

MV Asian Glory is a United Kingdom-flagged vehicle carrier owned by Zodiac Maritime Ltd of London. Built in 1994 by Hyundai Heavy Industries in Ulsan, South Korea, the vessel has a gross tonnage of 44,818 and a deadweight tonnage of 13,363. The ship is operated by EUKOR Car Carriers on a time charter basis, primarily transporting Hyundai and Kia vehicles.

== Hijacking ==
On 1 January 2010, Asian Glory was hijacked by Somali pirates approximately 1,000 km (620 mi; 540 nmi) off the Horn of Africa while en route from Singapore to Saudi Arabia. The vessel was carrying 2,405 vehicles, including 2,388 new Hyundai and Kia cars destined for the Saudi Arabian market.

The pirates used a previously hijacked Pakistani fishing vessel, FV Shahzaib, as a mother ship to carry out the attack. The Pakistani vessel and its 29 crew members were subsequently released.

Although Asian Glory was registered in the United Kingdom, no British citizens were among the 25 crew members on board. The crew consisted of ten Ukrainians, eight Bulgarians, five Indians, and two Romanians. The ship's captain was Veliko Velikov, a Bulgarian national from Varna.

During the months of captivity, unconfirmed reports emerged that the pirates had separated Captain Velikov from the rest of the crew in early March 2010. Reports from EUNAVFOR Somalia indicated that the pirates may have used Asian Glory as a mother ship for further hijacking operations, as the vessel was spotted several times in open waters off the Somali coast.

=== Release ===
Asian Glory was released on 11 June 2010 following the payment of a ransom. While the exact amount was not officially disclosed, reports indicated that the pirates had demanded approximately US$15 million, allegedly equivalent to the combined value of the ship's insurance and cargo. The vessel was escorted to Oman by a British naval ship, with all 25 crew members reported safe and the entire cargo of vehicles returned intact and undamaged.

Zodiac Maritime declined to provide further details about the release, citing concerns for the safety of crew members on other vessels still held by Somali pirates.

== See also ==
- EUKOR
- Piracy off the coast of Somalia
