= MV Liberty Sun =

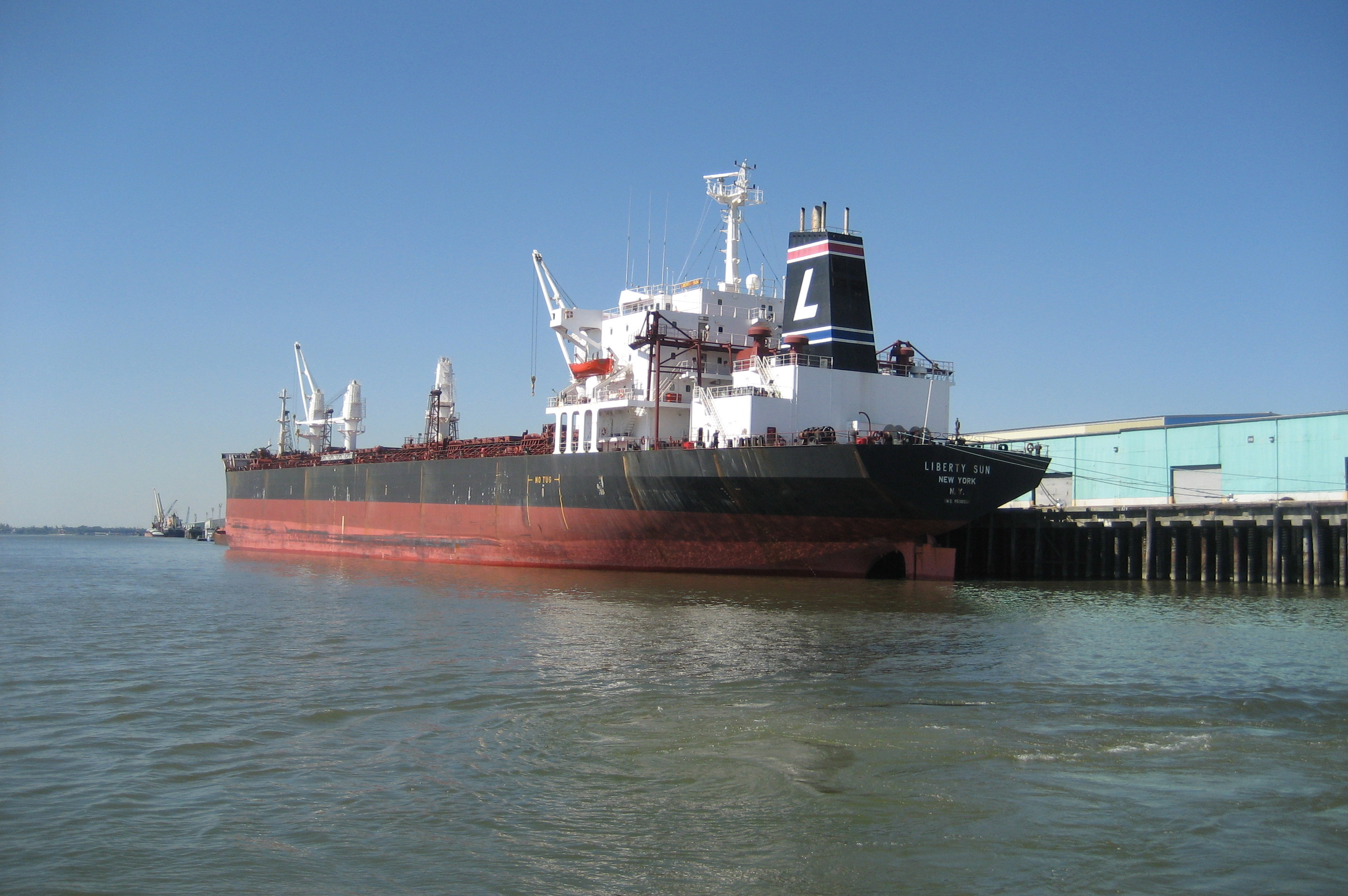
- MV Liberty Sun in 2007

History
- Name: Liberty Sun
- Owner: Liberty Maritime Corporation
- Route: Texas to Mombasa
- Launched: 21 June 1986
- Identification: IMO number: 8500551
- Fate: Scrapped 5 March 2013

MV Liberty Sun is a ship unsuccessfully attacked by Somali pirates on 14 April 2009. After unloading food aid at Port Sudan, she was proceeding to Mombasa with humanitarian aid, when she was attacked by pirates armed with AK-47s and rocket-propelled grenades. After successfully avoiding being boarded, she was assisted by USS Bainbridge. The French frigate Nivôse captured 11 of the pirates who had attacked Liberty Sun. Bainbridge had on board Captain Richard Phillips of the Maersk Alabama hijacking, shortly after he had been freed in an operation which left three pirates dead and one captured. One of the pirates, Abdi Garad, told AFP news agency that they had intended to destroy the ship and its crew. "The aim of this attack was totally different. We were not after a ransom. We also assigned a team with special equipment to chase and destroy any ship flying the American flag in retaliation for the brutal killing of our friends."

Chief mate Bill Kenneweg recorded a video of part of the assault.
