= FV Shahzaib =

Pakistani fishing vessel

History
- Name: Shahzaib
- Port of registry: Pakistan

FV Shahzaib is a Pakistani fishing vessel, captured by Somali pirates and used as a mother ship in the attack on the MV Asian Glory.
