= List of warship classes of the Royal Australian Navy =

This is a list of major classes of warship operated by the Royal Australian Navy. Included are capital ships, amphibious vessels, cruisers, destroyers and frigates.

== Aircraft carriers ==
Following the Second World War, the RAN began a policy of blue water operations built around an aircraft carrier. Two light fleet carriers were purchased from the Royal Navy, one of which, HMAS Melbourne, was modified with all the latest enhancements in carrier design. Melbourne continued as the RAN's flagship until 1982, when it was planned to replace her with a STOVL carrier, again purchased from the Royal Navy. However, the sale of HMS Invincible was cancelled by the British Government after the Falklands War. Soon after, the Australian Government decided to end aircraft carrier operations.

=== Conventional aircraft carriers ===
- Majestic class
  - HMAS Sydney
  - HMAS Melbourne
- Colossus class
  - HMAS Vengeance

=== Seaplane ===
- HMAS Albatross

== Capital ships ==
When the RAN was first founded, it was decided that a capital ship would be constructed to serve as the fleet flagship. Initially conceived as a unit of the Royal Navy, the second Indefatigable-class battlecruiser was paid for and crewed by Australians, and was thus commissioned as HMAS Australia. Australia was the only true "capital ship" to serve in the RAN.

=== Battlecruiser ===
- Indefatigable class
  - HMAS Australia

== Amphibious assault shipping ==
- Landing Ship Infantry
  - HMAS Kanimbla
  - HMAS Manoora
  - HMAS Westralia
- Mark III Landing Ship Tank – six ships
- Landing Craft Heavy
  - Balikpapan class - eight ships
- Heavy Landing Ship
  - HMAS Tobruk
- High Speed Catamaran
  - HMAS Jervis Bay
- Kanimbla class
  - HMAS Kanimbla
  - HMAS Manoora
- Bay class
  - HMAS Choules
- Canberra class
  - HMAS Canberra
  - HMAS Adelaide

== Cruisers ==
=== Heavy cruisers ===
- The RAN ordered two County-class cruisers in 1924 which were included with the Royal Navy's order for five; the loss of Canberra during the Second World War. Shropshire was transferred from the RN to the RAN to replace the lost ship.
  - HMAS Canberra
  - HMAS Australia
  - HMAS Shropshire

=== Protected cruiser ===
- HMAS Encounter

=== Light cruisers ===
- Pelorus class – two ships
- Town class – four ships
- Leander class – three ships

== Destroyers ==
- River class (1910) – six ships
- S class (1919) – five ships
- Marksman class (1919) – one ship
- V class (1933) – three ships
- W class (1933) – one ship
- Scott class (1933) – one ship
- N class (1940) – five ships
- Q class (1942) – five ships
- Tribal class (1942) – three ships
- Battle class (1950) – two ships
- Daring class (1957) – four ships
- Perth class (1965) – three ships
- Hobart class (2017) – three ships

== Frigates ==
- River class (1943) – twelve ships
- River class (1961) – six ships
- Adelaide class (1980) – six ships
- Anzac class (1996) – eight ships

== Corvettes ==
- Bathurst class (1940) - fifty-six ships

== Sloops ==
- Flower class – three ships
- Grimsby class – four ships
