= MV Almezaan =

General cargo vessel active off the Horn of Africa

History
- Name: Almezaan
- Owner: Shahmir Maritime, St. Vincent and the Grenadines
- Operator: Biyat International, Dubai, UAE
- Port of registry: Panama
- Route: Dubai to Mogadishu
- Launched: 1979
- Identification: IMO number: 7906710

General characteristics
- Tonnage: 2,886 DWT
- Length: 89 m (292 ft 0 in)
- Beam: 13 m (42 ft 8 in)
- Crew: 17

MV Almezaan is a general cargo vessel active off the Horn of Africa. Originally built as the Tarcau, she was renamed in November 2001. The name can be translated from Arabic as "the balance" or "the scales" as well as justice and equity.

== Pirate attacks ==
The vessel has been attacked three times by Somali pirates. The first attack and capture was 1 May 2009, when the vessel, said to be taking wheat and used vehicles to Mogadishu, was captured and taken to Harardhere. It was released on 6 May 2009, reportedly without a ransom being paid and after it was confirmed that it had been hired by a local trader.

The second attack was 8 November 2009. The ship was held off Garacad and released on 19 November 2009, after a ransom of $15,000 was paid. The ship was believed to be carrying small arms, ammunition, rockets, and rocket-propelled grenades, as well as armoured vehicles, but this was later denied by the owners.

The ship was again attacked on 20 March 2010, while on its way to Mogadishu. The attack was repelled by a private security guard convoy, and one pirate was killed. Six suspected pirates were captured by Navfor the same day, but released after the master and crew of the Almezaan refused to testify.
