= List of ships attacked by Somali pirates =

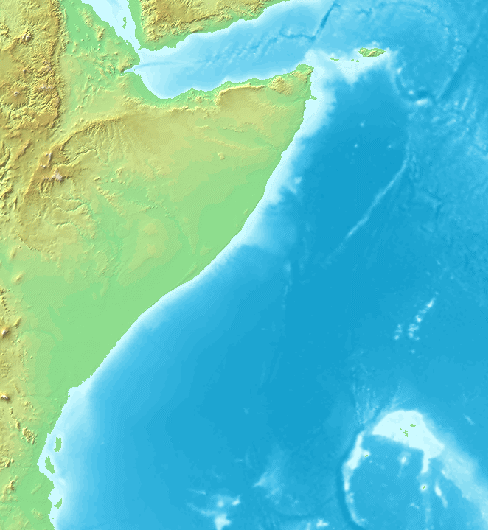
General area of the Indian Ocean, Gulf of Aden and Socotra Passage where pirates operate

Piracy off the coast of Somalia has been a threat to international shipping since the beginning of the Somali Civil War in the early 1990s. Since 2005, many international organizations have expressed concern over the rise in acts of piracy. Piracy impeded the delivery of shipments and increased shipping expenses, costing an estimated $6.6-$6.9 billion a year in global trade according to Oceans Beyond Piracy (OBP). According to the German Institute for Economic Research (DIW), a veritable industry of profiteers also arose around the piracy. Insurance companies significantly increased their profits from the pirate attacks as insurance companies hiked premium rates in response.

Combined Task Force 150, a multinational coalition task force, took on the role of fighting the piracy by establishing a Maritime Security Patrol Area (MSPA) within the Gulf of Aden and Socotra Passage. According to the International Maritime Bureau, pirate attacks had by October 2012 dropped to a six-year low, with only one ship attacked in the third quarter compared to thirty-six during the same period in 2011. By December 2013, the US Office of Naval Intelligence reported that only 9 vessels had been attacked during the year by pirates, with zero successful hijackings. Control Risks attributed this 90% decline in pirate activity from the corresponding period in 2012 to the adoption of better management practices by vessel owners and crews, armed private security on board ships, a significant naval presence, and the development of onshore security forces.

== List of ships captured or attacked off the Somali coast ==
=== 2005 ===
Image	Flag (owner)	Name (class)	Crew (cargo)	Status	Date of attack	Coordinates
Image	Flag (owner)	Name (class)	Crew (cargo)	Status	Date of release	Ransom demanded
	Hong Kong	MV Feisty Gas (LPG carrier)	120 (unknown)	Released after ransom	2005-04-10	unknown
	Hong Kong	MV Feisty Gas (LPG carrier)	120 (unknown)	Released after ransom	not known	US$315,000
MV Feisty Gas, a liquefied petroleum gas tanker, was seized by Somali pirates. The Hong Kong-based company which owned the vessel reportedly paid $315,000 to a representative of the Somali pirates in Mombasa, Kenya, according to a UN report.
	Kenya	MV Semlow (Freighter)	10 (unknown)	Released	2005-06-27	unknown
	Kenya	MV Semlow (Freighter)	10 (unknown)	Released	2005-10-03	US$50,000
MV Semlow, carrying UN food supplies for tsunami victims, was seized by pirates en route from Mombasa, Kenya to Bosasso, Somalia. They held the ship for 100 days until a Somali business man convinced them to leave without payment.
	Liberia (Ukraine)	MV Panagia (bulk carrier)	22 all ukrainian (coal)	Released after ransom	2005-10-18	unknown
	Liberia (Ukraine)	MV Panagia (bulk carrier)	22 all ukrainian (coal)	Released after ransom	2005-11-25	US$700,000
MV Panagia, a 22b,046 GRT bulk carrier with coal from South Africa to Turkey, was seized by Somali pirates some 90 nautical miles (170 km) off the east coast. A Ukrainian-based company that owns the vessel reportedly paid $700,000 to a representative of the Somali pirates in Mombasa, Kenya.
Seabourn Spirit	Bahamas (United States)	MV Seabourn Spirit (cruise ship)	210 (Passengers)	Capture failed	2005-11-05	unknown
Seabourn Spirit	Bahamas (United States)	MV Seabourn Spirit (cruise ship)	210 (Passengers)	Capture failed	Capture failed	none
Seabourn Spirit, a luxury cruise ship carrying 210 crew members and passengers, was attacked by pirates off the coast of Somalia. Riding in two small speedboats, the pirates fired at the ship with machine guns and rocket-propelled grenades, but the crew drove them off with a water hose and a long range acoustic device.

=== 2006 ===
Image	Flag (owner)	Name (class)	Crew (cargo)	Status	Date of attack	Coordinates
Image	Flag (owner)	Name (class)	Crew (cargo)	Status	Date of release	Ransom demanded
MV Safina al-Birsarat	India	MV Safina al-Birsarat (dhow)	16 (coal)	Rescued by the United States Navy	2006-01-16	unknown
MV Safina al-Birsarat	India	MV Safina al-Birsarat (dhow)	16 (coal)	Rescued by the United States Navy	2006-01-22	none
Pirates hijacked the India-registered MV Safina al-Birsarat along with its crew of 16 Indians. On January 22, USS Winston S. Churchill, an Arleigh Burke-class destroyer, intercepted the vessel. After warning shots were fired, the pirates surrendered and all ten on board were taken into custody. The ten were transported to Mombasa, Kenya, where they were sentenced to seven years in prison by a court.
USS Cape St. George USS Gonzalez	United States	USS Cape St. George (CG-71) (Ticonderoga-class cruiser); USS Gonzalez (DDG-66) (Arleigh Burke-class destroyer)	unknown (none)	Attack failed, one pirate killed and twelve captured.	2006-03-18	unknown
USS Cape St. George USS Gonzalez	United States	USS Cape St. George (CG-71) (Ticonderoga-class cruiser); USS Gonzalez (DDG-66) (Arleigh Burke-class destroyer)	unknown (none)	Attack failed, one pirate killed and twelve captured.	N/A	none
USS Cape St. George, a Ticonderoga-class cruiser, and USS Gonzalez, an Arleigh Burke-class destroyer, engaged pirate vessels after receiving fire from them.

=== 2007 ===
Image	Flag (owner)	Name (class)	Crew (cargo)	Status	Date of attack	Coordinates
Image	Flag (owner)	Name (class)	Crew (cargo)	Status	Date of release	Ransom demanded
	Saint Vincent and the Grenadines	MV Rozen (cargo ship)	12 (UN food aid)	Released	2007-02-25	11°50′0″N 51°35′0″E
	Saint Vincent and the Grenadines	MV Rozen (cargo ship)	12 (UN food aid)	Released	2007-04-05	unknown
Somali pirates with automatic weapons captured the ship, carrying six Kenyans and six Sri Lankans. On February 27, members of the Somali coast guard attempted to take back the ship but failed, and two coast guardsmen were killed.
	Taiwan	FV Ching Fong Hwa 168 (fishing vessel)	15 (fish)	14 crew released, 1 crew member executed.	2007-04-28	unknown
	Taiwan	FV Ching Fong Hwa 168 (fishing vessel)	15 (fish)	14 crew released, 1 crew member executed.	2007-11-05	US$1,500,000
The Taiwanese fishing vessel was hijacked on May 28, 2007. The surviving crew of ten Chinese, two Taiwanese and two Filipino crew members was released on November 5 after spending more than six months in captivity. One Chinese crew member was killed by the pirates on May 28 because the ship's owners failed to meet their ransom demands.
FV Mavuno No. 1 and FV Mavuno No. 2	Tanzania (South Korea)	FV Mavuno No. 1 (fishing vessel); FV Mavuno No. 2 (fishing vessel)	25 (fishing equipment)	unknown	2007-05-15	1°10′0″N 49°0′0″E
FV Mavuno No. 1 and FV Mavuno No. 2	Tanzania (South Korea)	FV Mavuno No. 1 (fishing vessel); FV Mavuno No. 2 (fishing vessel)	25 (fishing equipment)	unknown	2007-11-00	none
Two Tanzanian-registered ships belonging to Korea's Daechang Fishing were seized about 210 nautical miles (390 km) off the Somali capital of Mogadishu. Their 25 crew members (including ten Chinese, four South Koreans, three Vietnamese, four Indonesians and four Indians) were released six months later.
	Denmark	MV Danica White (cargo ship)	5 (unknown)	Released after ransom	2007-06-01	unknown
	Denmark	MV Danica White (cargo ship)	5 (unknown)	Released after ransom	2007-08-23	US$723,000 (negotiated down from $1.5 million)
The Danish-owned cargo ship MV Danica White was hijacked and maneuvered into Somali waters. On June 3, USS Carter Hall, a Harpers Ferry-class landing ship dock engaged the pirates, firing machine-gun bursts at the skiffs in tow behind the Danish ship, but failed to stop them. Following 83 days in captivity, the crew of five and the ship were released after the owner, H. Folmer & Co, paid a ransom of US$723,000, which was negotiated down from $1.5 million.
	Greece	FV Grecko 2 (fishing vessel)	4+ (unknown)	unknown	2007-09-20	unknown
	Greece	FV Grecko 2 (fishing vessel)	4+ (unknown)	unknown	not known	unknown
FV Greko 2 was hijacked 110 nautical miles (200 km) west of Berbera. The vessel was anchored near Raas Shula, all crew removed from vessel.
MV Golden Nori	Panama (Japan)	MV Golden Nori (chemical tanker)	12 (78,884 barrels)	Released after ransom	2007-10-28	13°5′0″N 50°24′0″E
MV Golden Nori	Panama (Japan)	MV Golden Nori (chemical tanker)	12 (78,884 barrels)	Released after ransom	2007-12-12	US$1,000,000
A Japanese chemical tanker, MV Golden Nori was hijacked off the coast of Somalia. USS Porter, an Arleigh Burke-class destroyer, sank the skiffs used by the pirates, but they still controlled the tanker. US and German naval vessels shadowed the captured vessel and blockaded the port of Bosaso, where the captured tanker was taken. Eventually, after demanding a ransom, the pirates freed the ship and its crew of 21 on December 12.
MV Al Marjan	Comoros	MV Al Marjan (cargo ship)	unknown (2,500 tons of cargo)	Released after ransom	2007-10-17	unknown
MV Al Marjan	Comoros	MV Al Marjan (cargo ship)	unknown (2,500 tons of cargo)	Released after ransom	2007-12-02	unknown
MV Al Marjan, owned by Biyat International, was travelling to Mombasa from Dubai when pirates hijacked it 10–20 nautical miles (19–37 km) from Mogadishu.
MV Dai Hong Dan	North Korea	MV Dai Hong Dan (cargo ship)	unknown (unknown)	Crew regained control	2007-10-29	2°11′57″N 45°47′55″E
MV Dai Hong Dan	North Korea	MV Dai Hong Dan (cargo ship)	unknown (unknown)	Crew regained control	2007-10-30	none
Pirates attacked the North Korean cargo ship MV Dai Hong Dan and captured its bridge, while the crew managed to retain control of the steering and engineering spaces. On October 30, the crew regained control of their ship, killing one pirate and capturing six. Three sailors were injured in the fight, and received medical assistance from US Navy Corpman from the Arleigh Burke-class destroyer USS James E. Williams.

=== 2013 ===
Image	Flag (owner)	Name (class)	Crew (cargo)	Status	Date of attack	Coordinates
Image	Flag (owner)	Name (class)	Crew (cargo)	Status	Date of release	Ransom demanded
	Hong Kong (United Kingdom)	Island Splendor (Oil tanker)	(Oil)	Attack failed.	2013-10-11	unknown
	Hong Kong (United Kingdom)	Island Splendor (Oil tanker)	(Oil)	Attack failed.	Attack failed.	unknown
On 11 October at 0918 UTC, pirates in two skiffs fired upon the tanker Island Splendor and attempted a boarding approximately 237 nautical miles (439 km) east of Hobyo, Somalia. The armed security team aboard the tanker fired flares and warning shots, whereupon the pirates returned fire with an automatic weapons. The security team engaged the pirates which resulted in the skiffs aborting the attack.
	Spain	Unknown (Fishing boat)	(Fish)	unknown	2013-10-14	unknown
	Spain	Unknown (Fishing boat)	(Fish)	unknown	unknown	unknown
According to reports, a Spanish fishing boat was attacked on 14 October by what is suspected to be the same group of pirates who attempted to attack Island Splendor. The pirates were then traced and captured by the Australian warship HMAS Melbourne.

=== 2017 ===
Image	Flag (owner)	Name (class)	Crew (cargo)	Status	Date of attack	Coordinates
Image	Flag (owner)	Name (class)	Crew (cargo)	Status	Date of release	Ransom demanded
	Comoros (United Arab Emirates)	Aris 13 (chemical tanker)	8 (Fuel)	Released	2017-03-13	11°48′30.4914″N 43°15′7.596″E
	Comoros (United Arab Emirates)	Aris 13 (chemical tanker)	8 (Fuel)	Released	2017-03-16	unknown (no ransom paid)
On 13 March 2017, Aris 13, was hijacked by pirates in two skiffs a few miles off Alula, the northernmost town of Somalia in Puntland. It was the first hijacking of a large commercial vessel since 2012. The ship was taking oil from Djibouti to the Somali capital, Mogadishu. Aris 13 was boarded by about two dozen armed men, who immediately turned off its tracking system after a distress call was sent from the ship. They then anchored her off Alula. On 16 March an intense gunfight started between the pirates and the Puntland Maritime Police Force, followed by intense negotiations between the marine force, local clan elders and the pirates, effectively ending the hijacking later that day. The crew was released unharmed. The pirates allegedly agreed to forego a ransom after learning that Somali businessmen had hired Aris 13. Pirates have traditionally been wary of tangling with Somalia's powerful businessmen. The ship had not followed the industry's Best Management Practices that might have prevented a hijacking. It travelled close to the shore at low speed.
	Tuvalu (Japan)	OS 35 (Bulk carrier)	18 (Bulk)	Released	2017-04-10	12°51′0″N 50°42′0″E
	Tuvalu (Japan)	OS 35 (Bulk carrier)	18 (Bulk)	Released	2017-04-11	None
OS 35 was a loaded bulk carrier en route from Port Kelang to Aden with armed security guards on board. However, the latter and evasive maneuvers could not prevent three presumed Somali pirates from boarding and hijacking the ship. However, the security alert sent by the ship alerted Indian and Chinese navy ships patrolling in the vicinity, who then embarked on a joint rescue operation. 18 Chinese navy personnel subsequently boarded the hijacked ship under a security air cover provided by the Indian Navy, and rescued the hijacked ship.

=== 2018 ===
Image	Flag (owner)	Name (class)	Crew (cargo)	Status	Date of attack	Coordinates
Image	Flag (owner)	Name (class)	Crew (cargo)	Status	Date of release	Ransom demanded
	Singapore	MT Leopard Sun (Oil/Chemical tanker)	unknown (unknown)	Attack failed	2018-10-30	unknown
	Singapore	MT Leopard Sun (Oil/Chemical tanker)	unknown (unknown)	Attack failed	N/A	none
In February 2018 MT Leopard Sun was fired upon by two skiffs 160 nautical miles (300 km) off the coast of Somalia. The ship's security team returned fire and the ship escaped. This was believed to be the first pirate attack in the area since November 2017.

=== 2024 ===
Image	Flag (owner)	Name (class)	Crew (cargo)	Status	Date of attack	Coordinates
Image	Flag (owner)	Name (class)	Crew (cargo)	Status	Date of release	Ransom demanded
	Bangladesh	MV Abdullah (Container Ship)	23 (Container cargos)	Released after ransom	2024-3-12	unknown
	Bangladesh	MV Abdullah (Container Ship)	23 (Container cargos)	Released after ransom	2024-4-20	Unknown

=== 2026 ===
Image	Flag (owner)	Name (class)	Crew (cargo)	Status	Date of attack	Coordinates
Image	Flag (owner)	Name (class)	Crew (cargo)	Status	Date of release	Ransom demanded
	Palau	MT Honour 25 (Oil tanker)	17 (18,500 barrels of oil)	Retaken by security forces (5 crew killed)	2026-4-21	unknown
	Palau	MT Honour 25 (Oil tanker)	17 (18,500 barrels of oil)	Retaken by security forces (5 crew killed)	2026-9-29	$3 million, $1.9 million, $1 million
On April 21, 2026, six armed Somali pirates hijacked the Palau-flagged MT Honour 25 approximately 30 nautical miles (56 km; 35 mi) off the coast of Puntland, with 17 crew members and 18,500 barrels of oil onboard. During the five-month deadlock, the pirates initially asked for a $3 million ransom, which they progressively reduced down to $1.9 million and eventually $1 million. This standoff culminated in a military intervention by the Puntland Maritime Police Force (PMPF) on September 29, 2026, during which the hijackers killed five crew members and injured four, before the PMPF ultimately secured the vessel, detained 16 pirates, and reported that at least 11 others escaped inland.
