= Combined Task Force 150 =

Intergovernmental naval operations

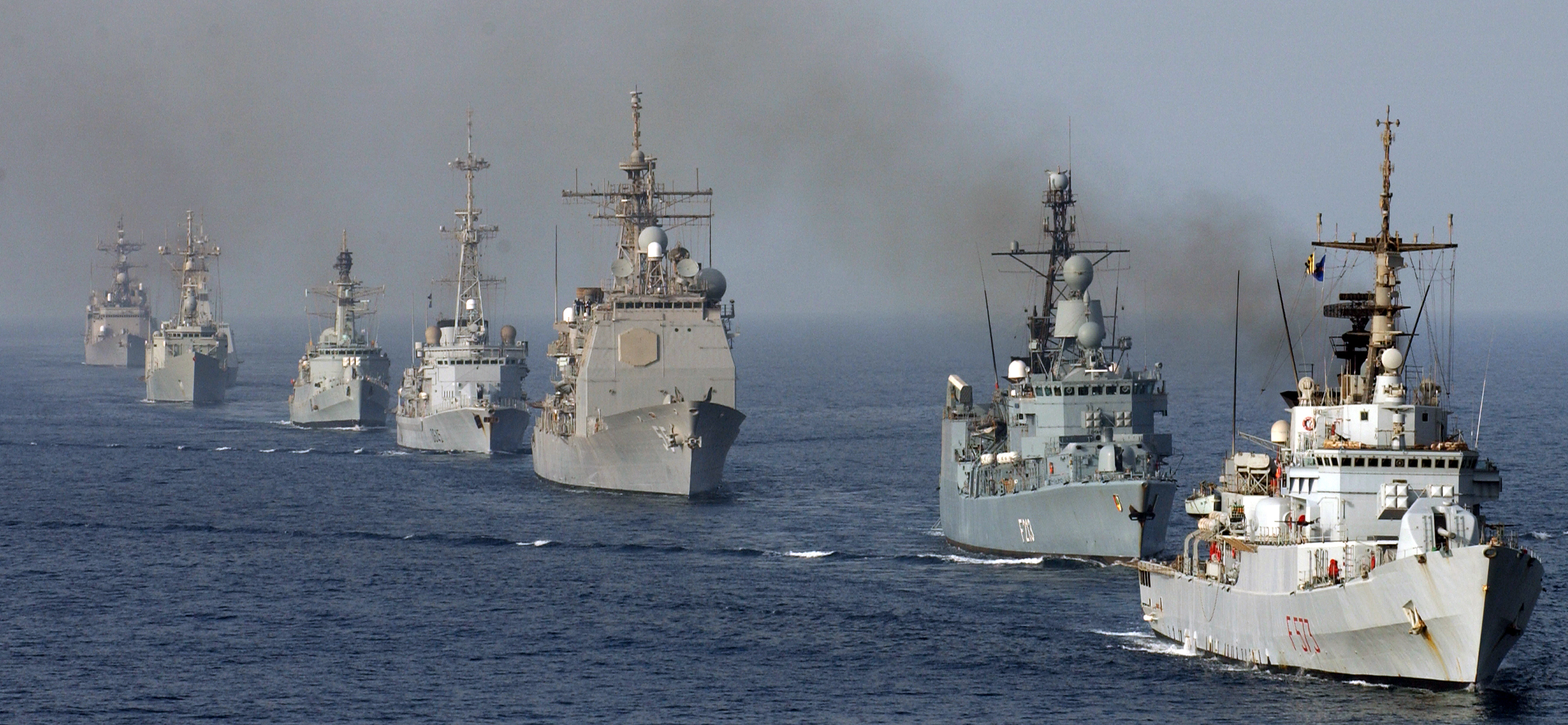
Ships assigned to Combined Task Force One Five Zero (CTF-150) assemble in a formation in the Gulf of Oman, 6 May 2004

Combined Task Force 150 (CTF-150) is a multinational coalition naval task force working under the 34-nation coalition of Combined Maritime Forces and is based in Bahrain established to monitor, board, inspect, and stop suspect shipping to pursue the "war on terror" and in the Horn of Africa region (HOA) includes operations in the North Arabia Sea to support operations in the Indian Ocean. These activities are referred to as Maritime Security Operations (MSO).

Countries presently contributing to CTF-150 include Australia, Canada, Denmark, France, Pakistan, Japan, Germany, the Netherlands, the United Kingdom and the United States. Other nations who have participated include Italy, India, Malaysia, New Zealand, Portugal, Singapore, Spain, Thailand and Turkey. The command of the task force rotates among the different participating navies and is currently led by the Pakistan Navy. The task force usually comprises 14 or 15 ships. CTF-150 is coordinated by the Combined Maritime Forces (CMF), a 33-nation coalition operating from the US Navy base in Manama, Bahrain.

== Gulf War 1990-1991 ==
In the last half of 1953 the designation Task Force 150 was given to a U.S. Navy force involved in Operation SUNEC - Support to North Eastern Command - resupplying of Arctic radar and weather stations. The main task was to resupply Thule, Greenland. Task Group 150.1 with its flag on USS Ashland (LSD-1) had six ships, including two Landing Ship Tanks (LSTs) and a tug; Task Group 150.3 with seven ships including two LSTs was the Pinetree Group, seemingly resupplying Pinetree Line radar stations; Task Group 150.4 was made up of four icebreakers; and Task Group 150.5 was the Cape Christian Group. (American Polar Operations, Data Sheet No. 26, p.4.)

After arrival in-theatre in late 1991, Vice Admiral Henry H. Mauz "retained the Middle East Force, designated CTG 150.1 [Commander Task Group 150.1], for most warfighting functions inside the Persian Gulf. Under this hat, Rear Admiral [William M. "Bill"] Fogarty would control only the half-dozen ships or so of the Middle East Force, augmented by the battleship Wisconsin when it arrived. Under a second hat, CTG 150.2, Fogarty would be the commander of the U.S. Maritime Interception Force. For this job, his authority would extend outside the Persian Gulf to ships operating in the North Arabian Sea and Red Sea, but only for interception operations." The CVBGs in the North Arabian Sea and Red Sea were designated Task Groups 150.4 and 150.5 respectively; the Amphibious and Landing Forces were CTG 150.6 and CTG 150.8 (Major General Jenkins). Rear Admiral Stephen S. Clarey was Commander U.S. Maritime Prepositioning Force, Commander Task Group 150.7 (CTG 150.7), with the equipment for the U.S. Marine Corps aboard. After the ships had disembarked the Marine equipment in Saudi Arabia, CTG 150.7 was disestablished on 12 September 1990.

From 1 January 1991, Commander Task Force 150 was Vice Admiral Henry H. Mauz, Jr. himself.

== 2002–2005 ==
Before 11 September 2001, Task Force 150 was a U.S. Navy formation serving as part of U.S. Naval Forces Central Command.

As interception operations intensified and the number of Coalition ships committed to OEF increased, NAVCENT formally established a multinational task force in February 2002. Focused solely on interdicting terrorists and their resources at sea, Combined Task Force (CTF) 150’s area of responsibility encompassed the Red Sea, Gulf of Aden, Horn of Africa, and Somalia Basin, as well as the Arabian Sea, Gulf of Oman and Strait of Hormuz. This expansive area covered more than 2.4 million square miles of coastline bordering 12 countries. Initially commanded by a U.S. naval officer, Rear Admiral Christopher C. Ames embarked in Bonhomme Richard (LHD 6), CTF-150 operated subsequently under the command of Coalition flag officers. Coalition partners such as France, Germany, Canada, Australia, Italy, the United Kingdom, and Spain contributed leadership, ships, and aircraft to the task force.

CTF 150 was established as the HOA MIO Force on 3 February 2002.

On 5 May 2002, command of the force was handed over from the United States to Germany. The German Defence Ministry announced in Berlin that day that the leadership of the Task Force, supported by five nations, was to be handed over from Captain Frothingham (U.S. Navy) to German Admiral Gottfried Hoch.

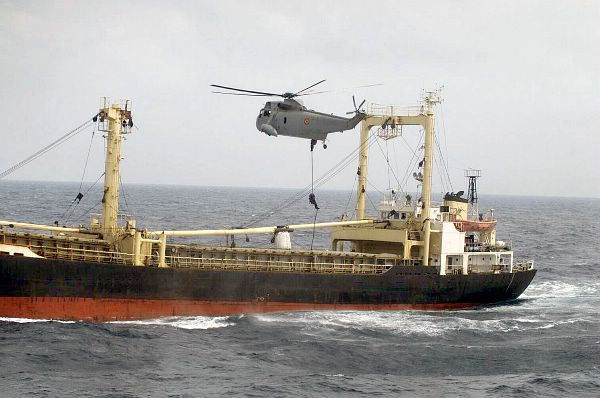
So San assault by Spanish special forces

On 9 December 2002, the Spanish frigate Navarra intercepted and boarded the freighter So San, several hundred miles southeast of Yemen at the request of the U.S. government as part of Operation Enduring Freedom. So San, sailing without a flag, attempted evasive action, so Navarra after firing four warning shots into the water at the bow of the ship and rifle fire on the ship's hull, getting no answer, fired on a cable crossing So San from bow to stern to remove obstacles and proceeded to approach it from a helicopter. The ship from North Korea was carrying a cargo of 15 Scud missiles, 15 conventional warheads with 250 kg of high explosive, 23 fuel tanks of nitric acid and 85 drums of chemicals. The freighter was handed over to the United States Navy. Yemen subsequently reported that the cargo belonged to them and protested against the interception, and as international law did not prohibit Yemen from purchasing the missiles the ship was released to proceed to Yemen.

In late December 2002, CTF-150 was commanded by Spanish Rear Admiral Juan Moreno, and comprised ships from France, Spain, Germany, the United Kingdom and United States. Rear-Admiral Moreno met with leaders of Combined Joint Task Force - Horn of Africa during that time (20 December 2002), aboard USS Mount Whitney, off Djibouti.

In January 2003, the task force held a visit, board, search and seizure (VBSS) exercise involving the following vessels:

- Spain: Navarra (flagship, frigate)
- United States: USS Mount Whitney – (command ship)
- Germany: Mecklenburg-Vorpommern (frigate), Rhön (tanker)
- Japan: JMSDF JDS Samidare (destroyer), JDS Myōkō (AEGIS destroyer), JDS Towada (replenishment oiler)

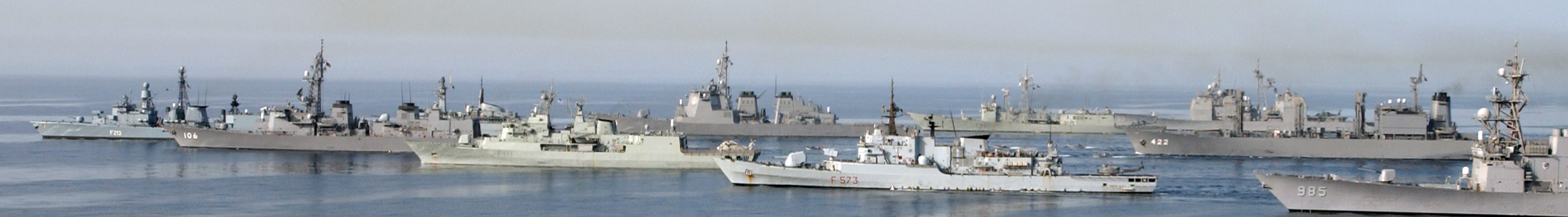
Ships of the multinational fleet Combined Task Force-150

The United States Coast Guard cutter USCGC Munro, working with the British aircraft carrier HMS Invincible and destroyer HMS Nottingham in the Gulf of Aden, intercepted a hijacked vessel at around noon on 17 March. The interception was ordered after Commander, U.S. Naval Forces Central Command (COMUSNAVCENT) received telephone reports from the International Maritime Bureau's Piracy Reporting Center in Kuala Lumpur, Malaysia, concerning the hijacking of the Thai-flagged fishing boat Sirichai Nava 12 by three Somalis on the evening of 16 March, as well as a fax indicating that the hijackers demanded U.S. $800,000 in ransom for the vessel's crew.

Commander, Combined Task Force (CTF) 150 tasked Invincible, Nottingham and Munro to investigate the situation. A Visit, Board, Search and Seizure (VBSS) team from Munro boarded Sirichai Nava, while a boarding team from Nottingham went on to a second fishing vessel, Ekhwat Patana, which was with the Thai vessel. Munro's boarding team detained the Somalis without incident.

One of the crew members of the Thai vessel had a minor flesh wound, which was treated by the Munro boarding team. The Coast Guardsmen also discovered four automatic weapons in the pilothouse, expended ammunition shells on the deck of the vessel, as well as ammunition on the detained suspects. The three suspects were transferred to Munro.

On 8 June 2005, CTF-150, under the command of Royal Navy Commodore Tony Rix, successfully conducted the boarding of the vessel Safari in international waters, leading to the seizure of 2.3 tons of hashish. The French D'Estienne d'Orves-class frigate Commandant Birot performed the boarding. The captured crew were transferred to the Arleigh Burke-class destroyer USS O'Kane.

On 17 August 2005, French Vice Admiral Jacques Mazars replaced Royal Navy Commodore Tony Rix as commander of CTF-150. At the time, it comprised ships of Italy, France, Germany, Pakistan, Canada, the United Kingdom and United States.

== 2006–2008: Operations off Somalia ==
=== Anti-piracy operations ===
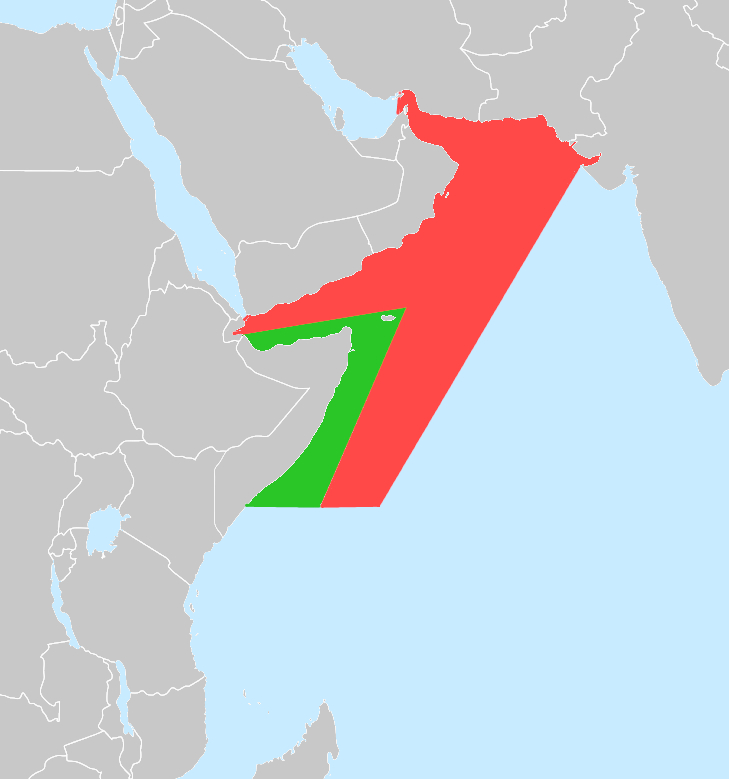
The Horn of Africa HOA (Green) and Horn of Africa Extended HOAEX (Red) maritime regions – the main areas of CTF-150

The Task Force has been engaged in anti-piracy operations in Somalia in parallel to other independent anti-piracy operations by countries such as China, Iran, India and Russia.

On 21 January 2006, USS Winston S. Churchill, an Arleigh Burke-class destroyer, captured a vessel operating off the Somali coast whose crew were suspected of piracy.

In the action of 18 March 2006, two United States Navy ships (USS Cape St. George, a Ticonderoga-class cruiser and USS Gonzalez, an Arleigh Burke-class destroyer) were attacked by Somali pirates during an opposed boarding. In the ensuing gun battle, all the pirates were either killed or captured.

On 4 April 2006, the South Korean fishing vessel MV Dong Won reported it had come under rocket attack off the coast of Somalia. Immediately two ships from the task force, the Dutch frigate HNLMS De Zeven Provinciën and the U.S. guided-missile destroyer USS Roosevelt responded. However, the pirates had already hijacked the vessel and reached Somali territorial waters after threatening the captured crew members.

On 24 April 2006, RAdm. Shahid Iqbal of Pakistan Navy relieved Dutch Commodore Hank Ort and assumed command of the Force.

On 22 August 2006, RAdm. Iqbal was relieved by German Rear Admiral Heinrich Lange.

In December 2006, Lange passed control to Royal Navy Commodore Bruce Williams.

In March 2007, the Dutch frigate HNLMS Evertsen deployed to the waters of the Horn of Africa, as part of CTF-150, and in response to a request from the United Nations World Food Programme, against piracy off the Somali coast.

The CTF-150 established the Maritime Security Patrol Area on 22 August 2008, through a narrow corridor within the Gulf of Aden aimed at deterring attack and hijacking of ships seeking safe passage through the zone.

Also in August 2008, the Danish command & support ship HDMS Absalon deployed to join and lead CTF 150 for a 6-month tour. On 17 September 2008, the Danish ship captured 10 pirates in two small ships. The pirates were in possession of ladders and other implements with which to board ships, as well as rocket launchers, machine pistols, and grenades. After consulting with the Danish Ministry of Justice and other task force members, it was determined by the Danish Ministry of Foreign Affairs that the pirates could only be prosecuted in Denmark, partly because the pirates would have faced the death penalty in the nearby states, and Danish law prohibits extraditing criminals when they might face the death penalty. Eventually, the pirates were freed, since the Danish authorities were concerned that it would be difficult to deport them back to Somalia once their sentences were served. The pirates were allowed to keep their ships, though not their weapons.

In December 2008, Absalon was involved in the rescue of putative Somali pirates 90 miles (140 km) off Yemen in the Gulf of Aden. The craft from Somalia was reported to hold rocket-propelled grenades and AK-47 assault rifles, and to have been adrift for several days. Also per the report, Absalon took the sailors and weapons aboard, sank the craft, and turned the sailors over to the Yemen coast guard. Absalon, according to The New York Times report, "was deployed in the Gulf of Aden [in] September ['08] as part of an international effort to curb piracy." part of Combined Task Force 150.

Under the leadership of officers aboard Absalon, "Task Force 150 divided the [waters] into 12 patrol "boxes", [each] of which was responsible for defending shipping in its designated area."

== Interdiction ==
Throughout 2006, the Somali Civil War continued to escalate. During this time, the task force conducted normal operations in the Indian Ocean. By early 2007 it became actively involved in providing a maritime cordon to prevent the escape of members of Al Qaeda suspected of being embedded within the ranks of the Islamic Courts Union (ICU).

Open warfare broke out between Ethiopian and the ICU forces on 20 December 2006, but until 2 January 2007 there had been no request by the Ethiopian or Somali military for CTF-150 to take action. On that day, the aim of the patrols shifted to "...stop SICC leaders or foreign militant supporters escaping".

On 4 January 2008 ships of the task force began performing Visit, Board, Search, and Seizure (VBSS) missions, boarding fishing boats (dhows) and oil tankers passing near the Somali coast. US ships of Combined Task Force 150 included the Arleigh Burke-class destroyer USS Ramage and the Ticonderoga-class cruiser USS Bunker Hill. Commodore Bruce Williams of the Royal Navy led the task force at this time.

== 2014–2017 ==
March 2014 saw HMAS Arunta seize 800 kg (1,800 lb) of hashish, USS Truxtun (DDG 103) seize over 200 large firearms and 600 kg (1,300 lb) of hashish, and USS Laboon intercept 270 kg (600 lb) and then 500 kg (1,100 lb) of hashish. April 2014 saw HMAS Darwin, an Adelaide-class frigate, intercept 1,032 kg (2,275 lb) of heroin from a dhow off the east coast of Africa. HMS Somerset seized 60 kg (130 lb) of heroin from a dhow in the northern Arabian Sea in May 2014. Then in July 2014 HMAS Darwin intercepted a further 6,248 kg (13,774 lb) of hashish on a dhow in the Indian Ocean.

HMS Defender, a Type 45 Royal Navy destroyer, seized over a ton of hashish from a dhow off Oman in June 2016.

In late April 2017, the French frigate Surcouf seized 400 kg (880 lb) of heroin from two dhows. In May 2017, HMS Monmouth, a Type 23 British frigate, stopped and searched a fishing boat in the Indian Ocean. Monmouth discovered 455 kg (1,003 lb) of cannabis and 266 kg (586 lb) of heroin.

== Command history ==
Command history
Date	Country	No. of times
05-Feb-02	Germany	1
02-Sep-02	Spain	1
31-Jan-03	Italy	1
01-Jun-03	Germany	2
29-Sep-03	France	1
29-Jan-04	UK	1
04-Apr-04	France	2
19-Sep-04	UK	2
06-Dec-04	Germany	3
05-Apr-05	UK	3
17-Aug-05	France	3
12-Dec-05	Netherlands	1
24-Apr-06	Pakistan	1
22-Aug-06	Germany	4
06-Dec-06	UK	4
04-Apr-07	France	4
01-Aug-07	Pakistan	2
04-Apr-08	France	5
03-Jun-08	Canada	1
15-Sep-08	Denmark	1
12-Jan-09	Germany	5
04-Apr-09	France	6
20-Jul-09	Pakistan	3
16-Dec-09	Australia	1
15-Apr-10	Pakistan	4
14-Oct-10	Australia	2
04-Apr-11	France	7
01-Aug-11	UK	5
16-Dec-11	Australia	3
17-Apr-12	Pakistan	5
30-Aug-12	UK	6
20-Dec-12	Australia	4
14-Apr-13	France	8
01-Aug-13	Pakistan	6
01-Dec-13	Australia	5
10-Apr-14	UK	7
14-Aug-14	Pakistan	7
04-Dec-14	Canada	2
06-Apr-15	France	9
30-Jul-15	Pakistan	8
03-Dec-15	Australia	6
07-Apr-16	UK	8
04-Aug-16	Pakistan	9
08-Dec-16	Canada	3
13-Apr-17	France	10
17-Aug-17	Pakistan	10
07-Dec-17	Australia	7
24-May-18	UK	9
09-Aug-18	KSA	1
06-Dec-18	Canada	4
28-Apr-19	Pakistan	11
08-Aug-19	UK	10
05-Dec-19	Australia	8
19-Mar-20	France	11
05-Aug-20	KSA	2
27-Jan-21	Canada	5
15-Jul-21	New Zealand	1
18-Jan-22	Pakistan	12
21-Jul-22	KSA	3

== See also ==
- Combined Task Force 151
- Combined Task Force 152
- Combined Task Force 153
- Operation Active Endeavour
- Operation Atalanta
