= OS35 (bulk carrier) =

Bulk carrier

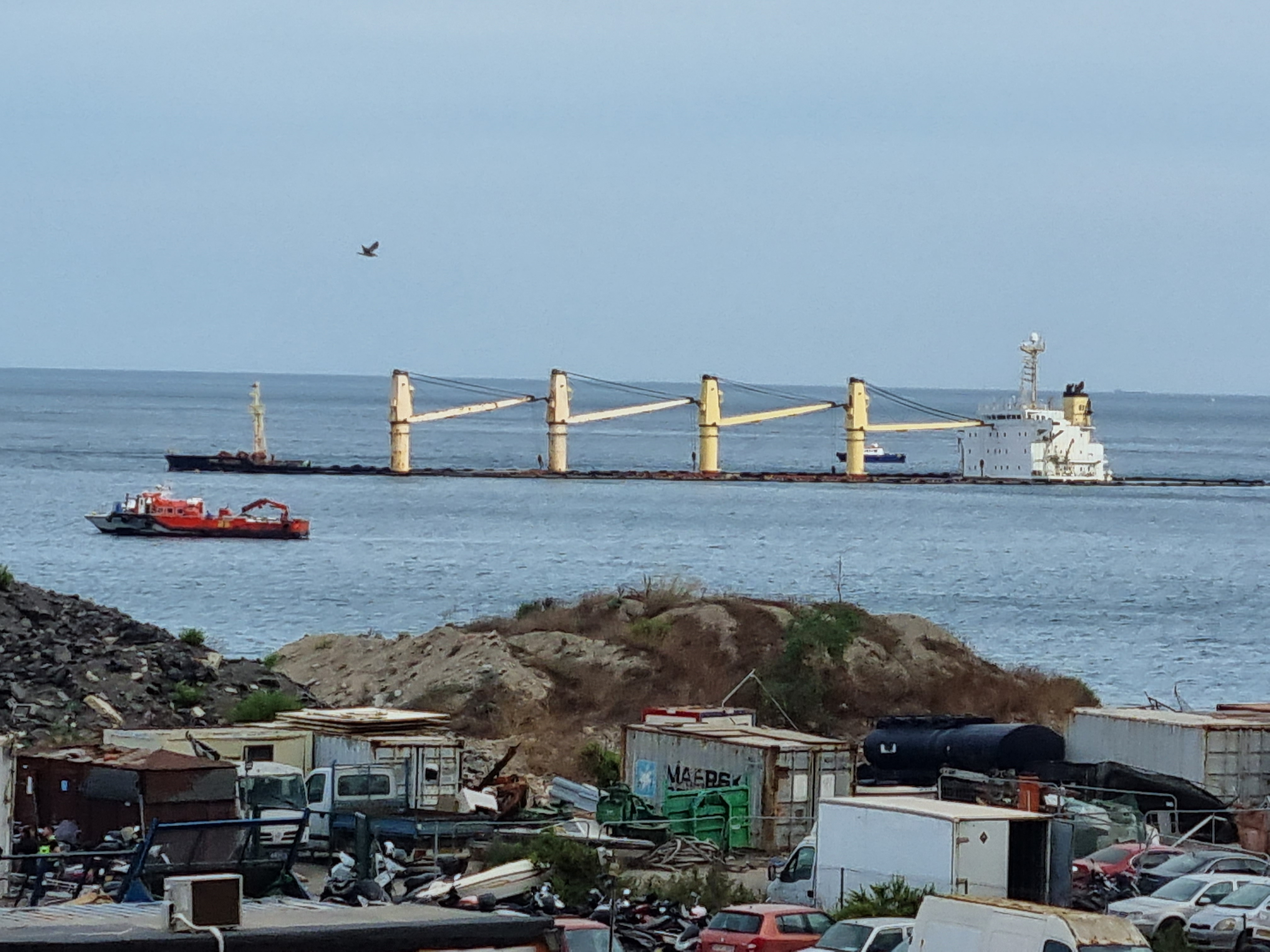
- The wrecked OS 35 as seen from the Gibraltar coast in September 2022.

History
- Name: Golden Harvest (1999–2006); Addu Comet (2006–2007); JS Comet (2007-2016); OS 35 (2016–2022)
- Owner: Shipping Bank (South Korea)
- Port of registry: Funafuti, Tuvalu
- Builder: Shin Kurushima Toyohashi Shipbuilding, Japan
- Completed: 1999
- Identification: IMO number: 9172399; MMSI number: 572852210; Callsign: T2WU4
- Fate: Beached after collision in August 2022, removed and scrapped in 2023

General characteristics
- Class & type: Bulk carrier
- Tonnage: 20,947 GT
- Length: 178 m (584 ft 0 in)
- Beam: 28 m (91 ft 10 in)

MV OS 35 was a bulk carrier registered in Tuvalu, a flag of convenience. It was attacked by pirates near Somalia in 2017, and was beached near Gibraltar after a ship collision in 2022. The ship was disposed of afterwards.

== Description ==
OS 35 was a bulk carrier with five cargo holds, a length overall of 178 metres (584 ft 0 in) and a breadth of 28 metres (91 ft 10 in), built in 1999 at Shin Kurushima Toyohashi shipyard in Japan. It had a gross tonnage of 20,947 and a deadweight tonnage of 35,362. The vessel was built as Golden Harvest. Thereafter, as the ship changed hands, its name was changed to Addu Comet, JS Comet and finally OS 35.

== 2017 pirate attack ==
In April 2017, the ship was en route from Port Klang, Malaysia to Aden, Yemen. On 8 April 2017, approximately 147 nautical miles (272 km) southeast of Mukalla, Yemen, the ship was boarded by pirates. The crew stopped the engine, retreated into the citadel, and called for help.

INS Mumbai and INS Tarkash of the Indian Navy, and Chinese navy frigate Yulin responded. The Indian ships provided a communication link with the crew and helicopter air cover. A 18-man Chinese special forces party boarded OS 35 and captured three pirates, including Aw Kombe who was involved in the Aris 13 hijacking. Two pirates escaped.

== 2022 collision ==
In August 2022, OS 35 collided with liquefied natural gas tanker Adam LNG off of Gibraltar and was beached. The wreck created an oil spill. Booms were deployed, and 80% of the ship's diesel fuel was removed by the morning of 2 September. Spain increased monitoring for pollution around the Bay of Gibraltar.

The ship was salvaged by Koole Contractors from The Netherlands from January 2023 to July 2023. A winter storm broke the ship in half. The sections were placed on a heavy-lift ship, and arrived at Amsterdam for ship breaking on 15 August.
