= Action of 18 March 2006 =

Skirmish between Somali pirates and US Navy

- Part of Piracy in Somalia, Operation Enduring Freedom – Horn of Africa
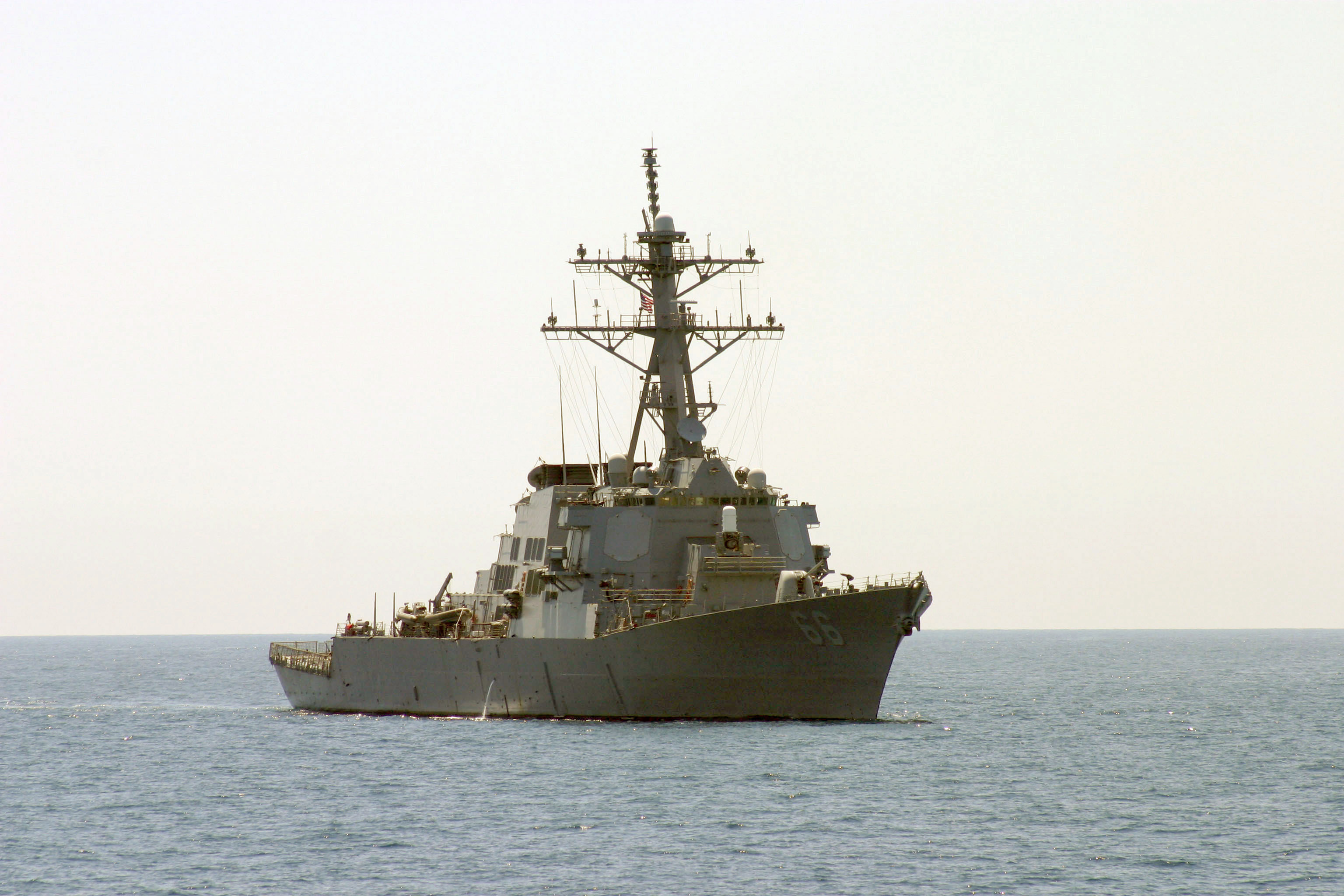
- USS Gonzalez in 2004
| Date | 18 March 2006 |
| Location | 25 nautical miles (46 km) off the coast of Somalia |
| Result | American victory |

Belligerents
| United States | Somali pirates |

Commanders and leaders
| Robert Randall Jr. James Yohe | Unknown |

Strength
| Destroyer Gonzalez; Cruiser Cape St. George Note | 3 skiffs |

Casualties and losses
| 1 cruiser superficially damaged | 1 skiff destroyed 2 skiffs captured 1+ killed 12 captured (5 of whom were wounded) |

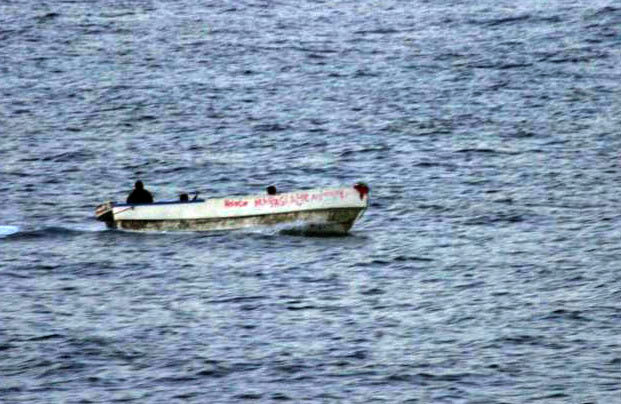
Pirate skiff involved in the incident

The action of 18 March 2006 occurred when two United States naval vessels were attacked by pirates off the Somali coast. The U.S. ships were part of Combined Task Force 150.

== Background ==
By 2006, the lack of any government-controlled naval authority along the Somali coast was taking its toll. Pirate gangs controlled by local warlords started to capture passing merchant ships in an attempt to gain funding by ransoming the ships and their crews. As the raids became successful, the pirates became bolder. They began seizing UN aid ships, and even attacked a cruise liner attempting to capture it for ransom. The U.S. and Coalition vessels from Combined Task Force 150 began actively pursuing pirate vessels in an attempt to deter the attacks.

== Battle ==
On 18 March the destroyer USS Gonzalez intercepted a suspicious ship, a large diesel-powered skiff towing two small gasoline-powered "attack" skiffs 25 nautical miles (29 mi; 46 km) off the Somali coast. USS Gonzalez first noticed the common pirate profile of a diesel boat towing smaller skiffs and, with USS Cape St. George closing from 40 miles (64 km) away, trailed the suspects until dawn. Shortly before sunrise, the two American ships each sent a pair of rigid inflatable boats with specially trained boarding teams to investigate. The boats' boarding attempt was aborted when the pirates opened fire on them from extremely short range, and they returned fire and withdrew.

The pirates chased the boarding team, then opened fire upon the Navy ships with rocket-propelled grenades and other small arms. Too close for major weapon systems, the two American ships returned fire with small caliber guns. The larger pirate skiff was soon set on fire by a .50 caliber tracer round fired from USS Gonzalez hitting and setting ablaze a 55-US-gallon (210 L; 46 imp gal) fuel drum, and burned to the waterline. The two small skiffs were engaged and surrendered to USS Cape St. George upon seeing the larger skiff with all their fuel in flames. By the time the action was over at least one pirate was killed (only one body was recovered from one of the remaining small skiffs), and 12 (including 5 wounded) pirates were captured. A spokesman for the Somali pirate militia in Hardhere claimed there were 27 pirates that had gone to sea to act as "coastguardsmen" for the largely lawless state. Cape St. George received minor superficial damage but no US forces were injured.

== Aftermath ==
After the action was over, a Dutch fast-combat support ship, HNLMS Amsterdam, provided medical assistance to the wounded, and the two U.S. ships continued on their mission. The U.S. government chose not to prosecute the captured men for piracy and repatriated them over a period of several months, some requiring advanced medical care aboard U.S. and Coalition warships due to the injuries they received during the action.
