= USS Gonzalez =

Guide missile destroyer of the US Navy

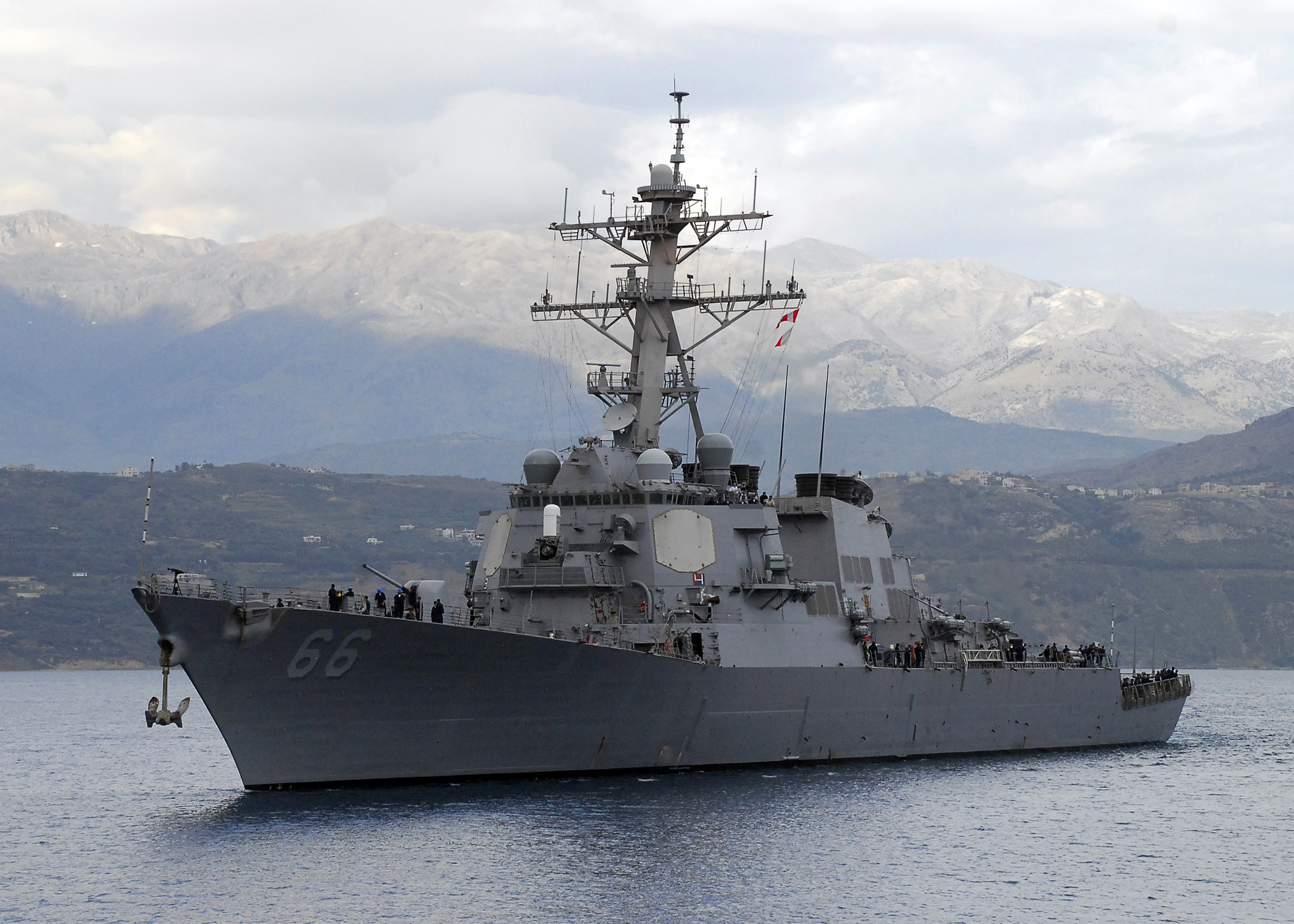
- USS Gonzalez on 6 June 2008

History

United States
- Name: Gonzalez
- Namesake: Alfredo Cantu Gonzalez
- Ordered: 16 January 1991
- Builder: Bath Iron Works
- Laid down: 3 February 1994
- Launched: 18 February 1995
- Acquired: 14 June 1996
- Commissioned: 12 October 1996
- Home port: Norfolk
- Identification: MMSI number: 368773000; Callsign: NGON; Hull number: DDG-66
- Motto: Beyond the Call
- Status: in active service
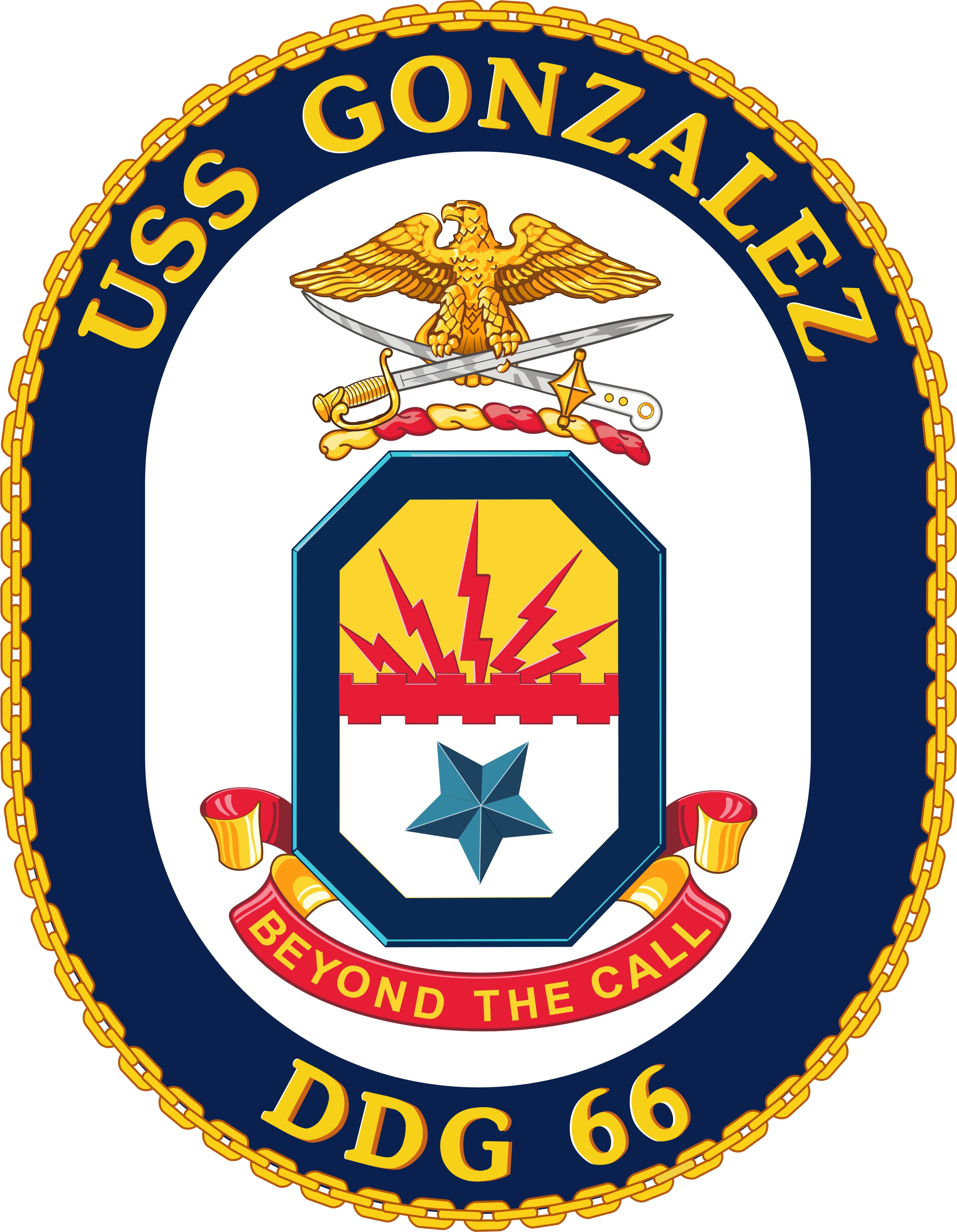
- Badge

General characteristics
- Class & type: Arleigh Burke-class destroyer
- Displacement: Light: approx. 6,800 long tons (6,900 t); Full: approx. 8,900 long tons (9,000 t)
- Length: 505 ft (154 m)
- Beam: 59 ft (18 m)
- Draft: 31 ft (9.4 m)
- Propulsion: 2 × shafts
- Speed: In excess of 30 kn (56 km/h; 35 mph)
- Range: 4,400 nmi (8,100 km; 5,100 mi) at 20 kn (37 km/h; 23 mph)
- Complement: 33 commissioned officers; 38 chief petty officers; 210 enlisted personnel
- Sensors & processing systems: AN/SPY-1D PESA 3D radar (Flight I, II, IIA); AN/SPY-6(V)1 AESA 3D radar (Flight III); AN/SPS-67(V)3 or (V)5 surface search radar (DDG-51 – DDG-118); AN/SPQ-9B surface search radar (DDG-119 onward); AN/SPS-73(V)12 surface search/navigation radar (DDG-51 – DDG-86); BridgeMaster E surface search/navigation radar (DDG-87 onward); 3 × AN/SPG-62 fire-control radar; Mk 46 optical sight system (Flight I, II, IIA); Mk 20 electro-optical sight system (Flight III); AN/SQQ-89 ASW combat system: AN/SQS-53C sonar array; AN/SQR-19 tactical towed array sonar (Flight I, II, IIA); TB-37U multi-function towed array sonar (DDG-113 onward); AN/SQQ-28 LAMPS III shipboard system
- Electronic warfare & decoys: AN/SLQ-32 electronic warfare suite; AN/SLQ-25 Nixie torpedo countermeasures; Mk 36 Mod 12 decoy launching systems; Mk 53 Nulka decoy launching systems; Mk 59 decoy launching systems
- Armament: Guns: 1 × 5-inch (127 mm)/54 mk 45 mod 1/2 (lightweight gun); 2 × 20 mm (0.8 in) Phalanx CIWS; 2 × 25 mm (0.98 in) Mk 38 machine gun system; 4 × 0.50 inches (12.7 mm) caliber guns; Missiles: 2 × Mk 141 Harpoon anti-ship missile launcher; 1 × 29-cell, 1 × 61-cell (90 total cells) Mk 41 vertical launching system (VLS): RIM-66M surface-to-air missile; RIM-156 surface-to-air missile; BGM-109 Tomahawk cruise missile; RUM-139 vertical launch ASROC; Torpedoes: 2 × Mark 32 triple torpedo tubes: Mark 46 lightweight torpedo; Mark 50 lightweight torpedo; Mark 54 lightweight torpedo
- Aircraft carried: 1 × Sikorsky MH-60R

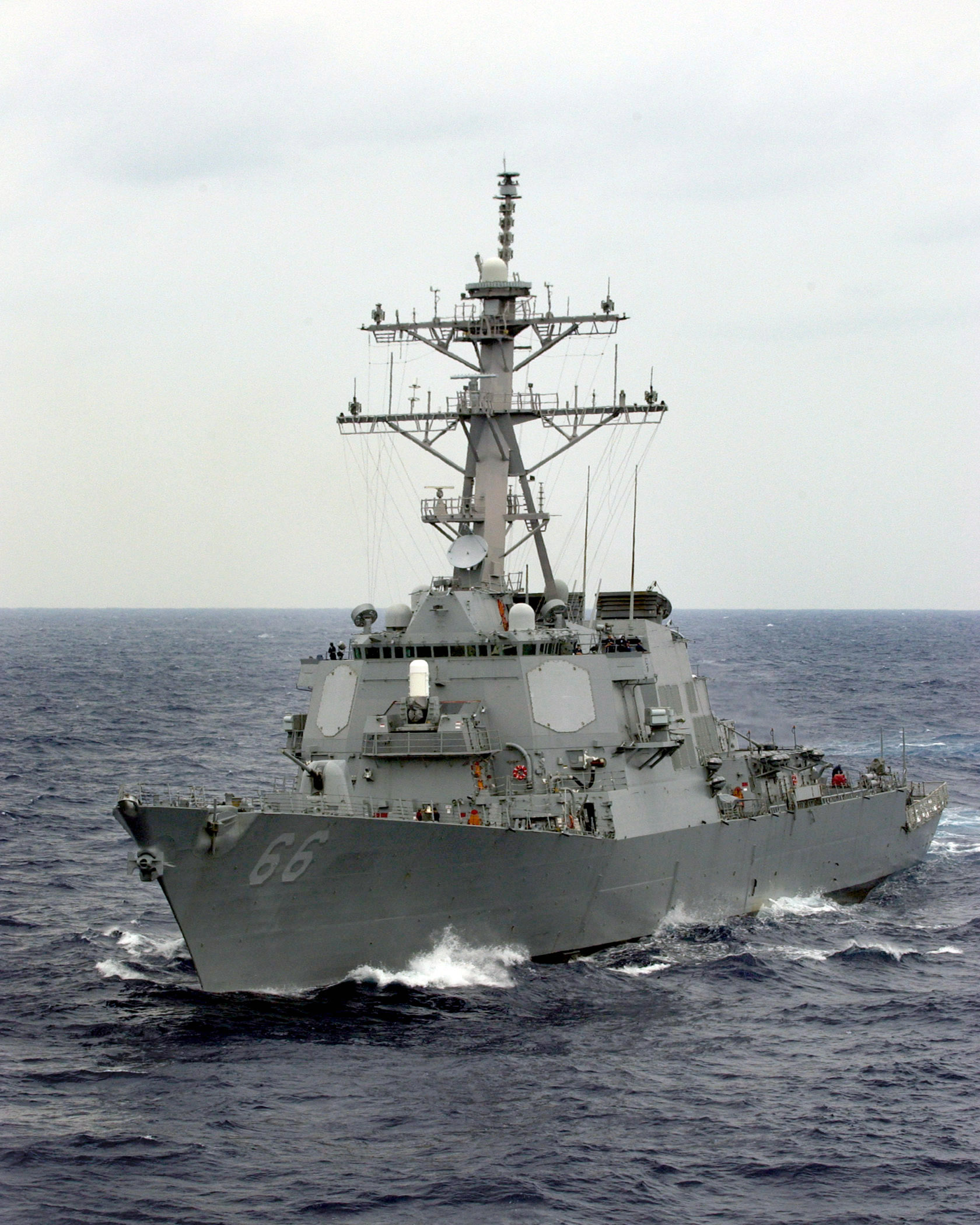
Gonzalez in the Atlantic, 2003

USS Gonzalez (DDG-66) is an Arleigh Burke-class (Flight I) Aegis guided missile destroyer in the United States Navy. She is named for Sergeant Alfredo Cantu Gonzalez, a Medal of Honor recipient in the Vietnam War.

== Service history ==
November 12, 1996 Gonzalez grounded on a coral reef at approximately 0800, off the island of Sint Maarten, damaging her sonar dome and several blades on both screws, costing $10 million in damage returning to service September 1997.

The ship took part in Operation Allied Force, firing Tomahawk cruise missiles at Serbian targets in 1999. Gonzalez also assisted a cruise ship, Seabourn Spirit, after an abortive attack by pirates off the coast of Somalia in 2005.

On 1 March 2006, the ship rescued the crew of an Iranian ship, whose engine and rudder were broken down since 18 February. The Iranian crew were returned to Iran. She was involved in the action of 18 March 2006 with suspected pirates, along with the cruiser USS Cape St. George. The two ships exchanged fire with the suspected pirates about 25 nautical miles (46 km) off the coast of Somalia. Initial reports indicated that one suspected pirate was killed and five others wounded.

On 17 July 2006, CNN reported that Gonzalez would be deployed to help in evacuation efforts of American citizens from Lebanon in the midst of the 2006 Israel-Lebanon conflict.

In May 2022, Gonzalez was homeported out of Naval Station Norfolk and a part of Destroyer Squadron 28, along with Carrier Strike Group 8 led by the USS Harry S. Truman.

== Awards ==
- Battle "E" – (2019)
- James F. Chezek Memorial Gunnery Award (1998)
