= USS Cape St. George =

Ticonderoga-class cruiser

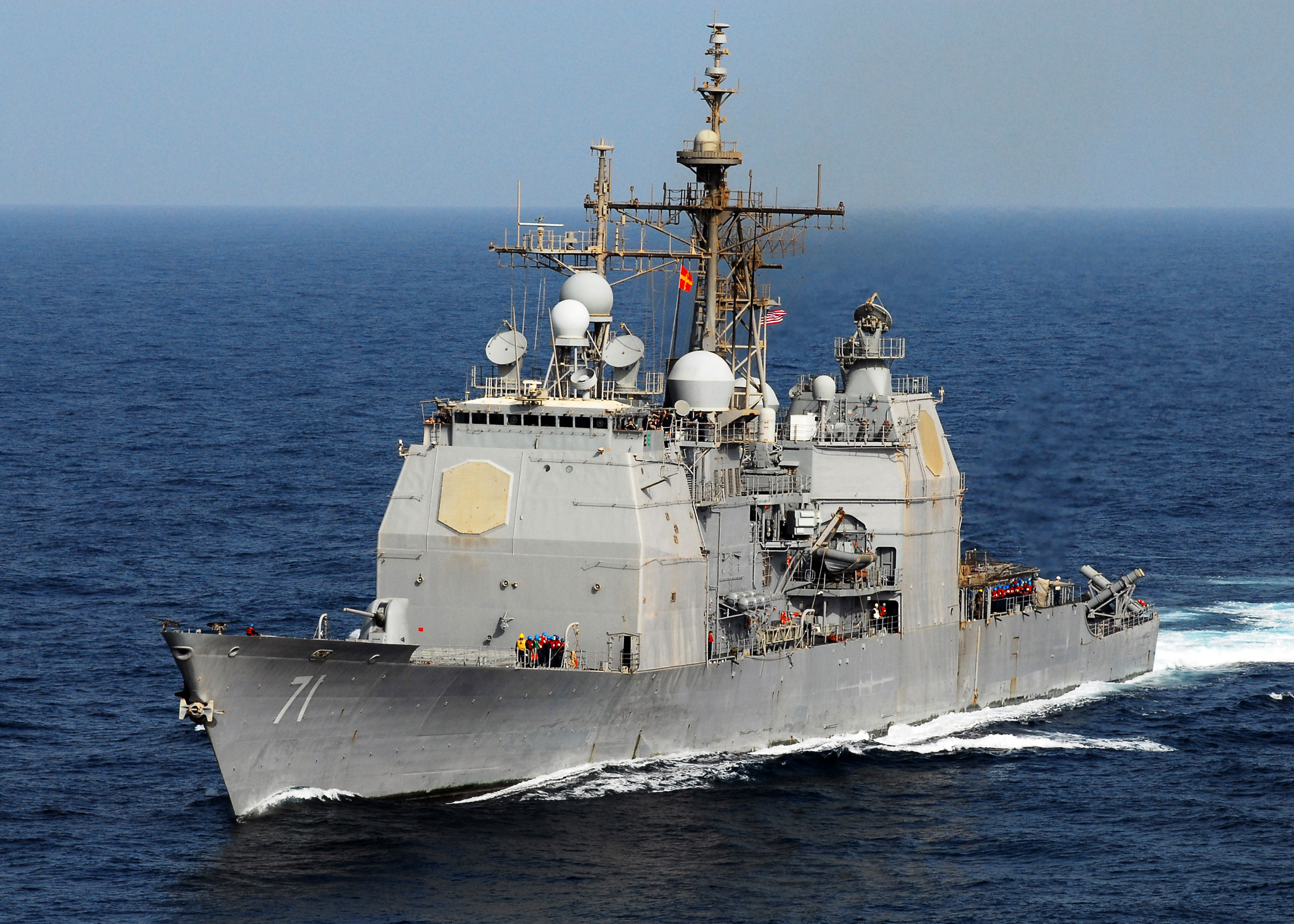
- USS Cape St. George (CG-71)

History

United States
- Name: Cape St. George
- Namesake: Battle of Cape St. George
- Ordered: 25 February 1988
- Builder: Ingalls Shipbuilding
- Laid down: 19 November 1990
- Launched: 10 January 1992
- Acquired: 13 April 1993
- Commissioned: 13 June 1993
- Home port: Naval Base San Diego, California
- Identification: MMSI number: 368217516; Call sign: NCSG; Hull number: CG-71
- Motto: Always Victorious
- Status: in active service
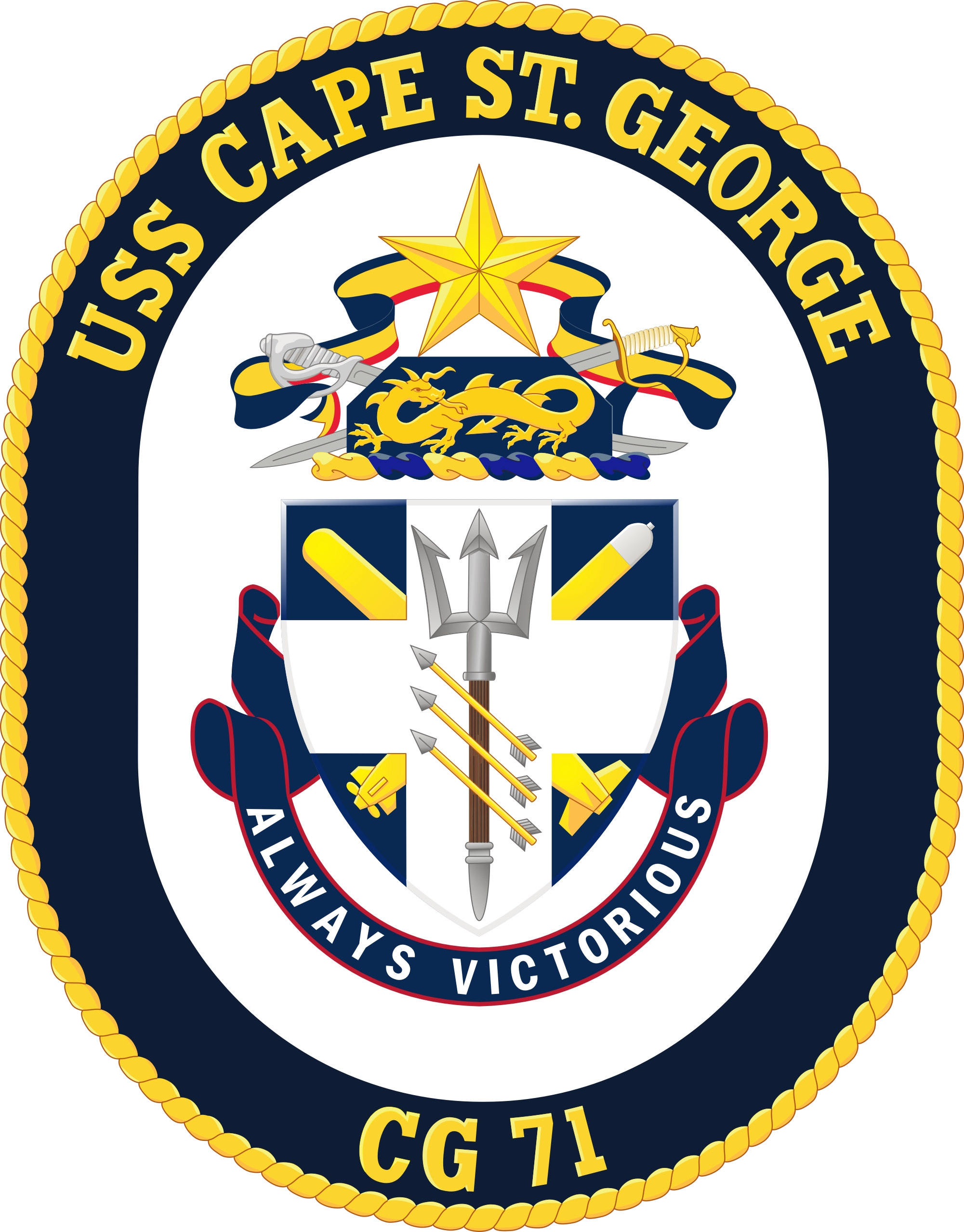
- Badge

General characteristics
- Class & type: Ticonderoga-class cruiser
- Displacement: Approx. 9,600 long tons (9,800 t) full load
- Length: 567 feet (173 m)
- Beam: 55 feet (16.8 meters)
- Draught: 34 feet (10.2 meters)
- Propulsion: 4 × General Electric LM2500 gas turbine engines; 2 × controllable-reversible pitch propellers; 2 × rudders
- Speed: 32.5 knots (60 km/h; 37.4 mph)
- Complement: 30 officers and 300 enlisted
- Sensors & processing systems: AN/SPY-1A/B multi-function radar; AN/SPS-49 air search radar (Removed on some ships); AN/SPG-62 fire control radar; AN/SPS-73 surface search radar; AN/SPQ-9 gun fire control radar; AN/SQQ-89(V)1/3 - A(V)15 Sonar suite, consisting of: AN/SQS-53B/C/D active sonar; AN/SQR-19 TACTAS, AN/SQR-19B ITASS, & MFTA passive sonar; AN/SQQ-28 light airborne multi-purpose system
- Armament: 2 × 61 cell Mk 41 vertical launch systems containing; 122 × mix of: RIM-66M-5 Standard SM-2MR Block IIIB; RIM-156A SM-2ER Block IV; RIM-161 SM-3; RIM-162A ESSM; RIM-174A Standard ERAM; BGM-109 Tomahawk; RUM-139A VL-ASROC; 8 × RGM-84 Harpoon missiles; 2 × 5 in (127 mm)/62 caliber Mark 45 Mod 4 lightweight gun; 2 × Mk 38 25 mm Machine Gun Systems; 2–4 × .50 in (12.7 mm) cal. machine gun; 2 × Phalanx CIWS Block 1B; 2 × Mk 32 12.75 in (324 mm) triple torpedo tubes
- Aircraft carried: 2 × MH-60R Seahawk LAMPS Mk III helicopters.

USS Cape St. George (CG-71) is a Ticonderoga-class cruiser laid down by the Litton-Ingalls Shipbuilding Corporation at Pascagoula, Mississippi, on 19 November 1990, launched on 10 January 1992, and commissioned on 12 June 1993. Cape St. George operates out of Naval Base San Diego, and administratively reports to the Commander, Naval Surface Forces Pacific. She is the newest Ticonderoga-class cruiser still in active service, since the decommissioning of USS Vella Gulf and USS Port Royal.

== Name ==
Cape St. George is named for the World War II Battle of Cape St. George near New Ireland in Papua New Guinea, where a U.S. Navy destroyer force led by Captain Arleigh Burke defeated a Japanese destroyer force on 25 November 1943.

== History ==
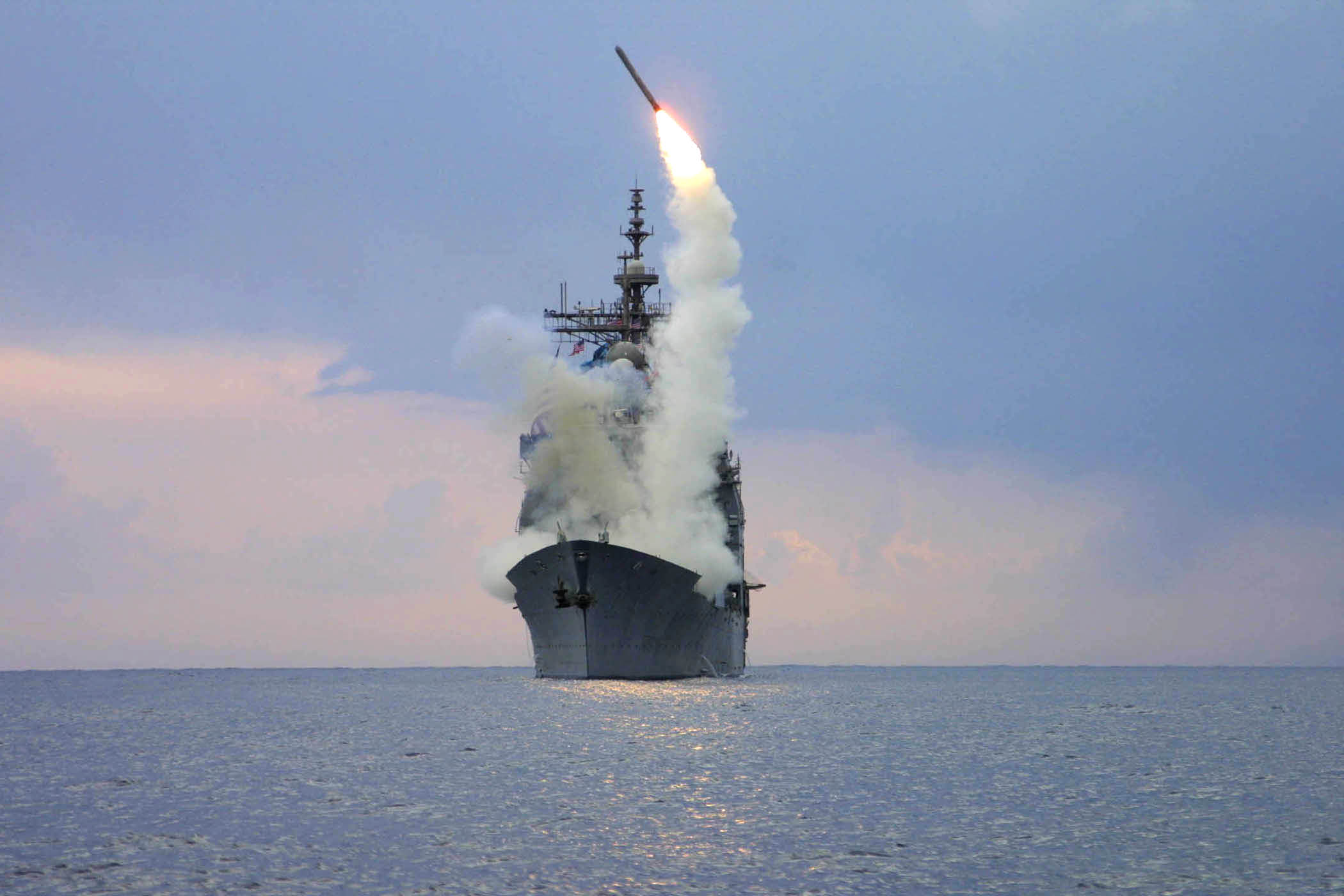
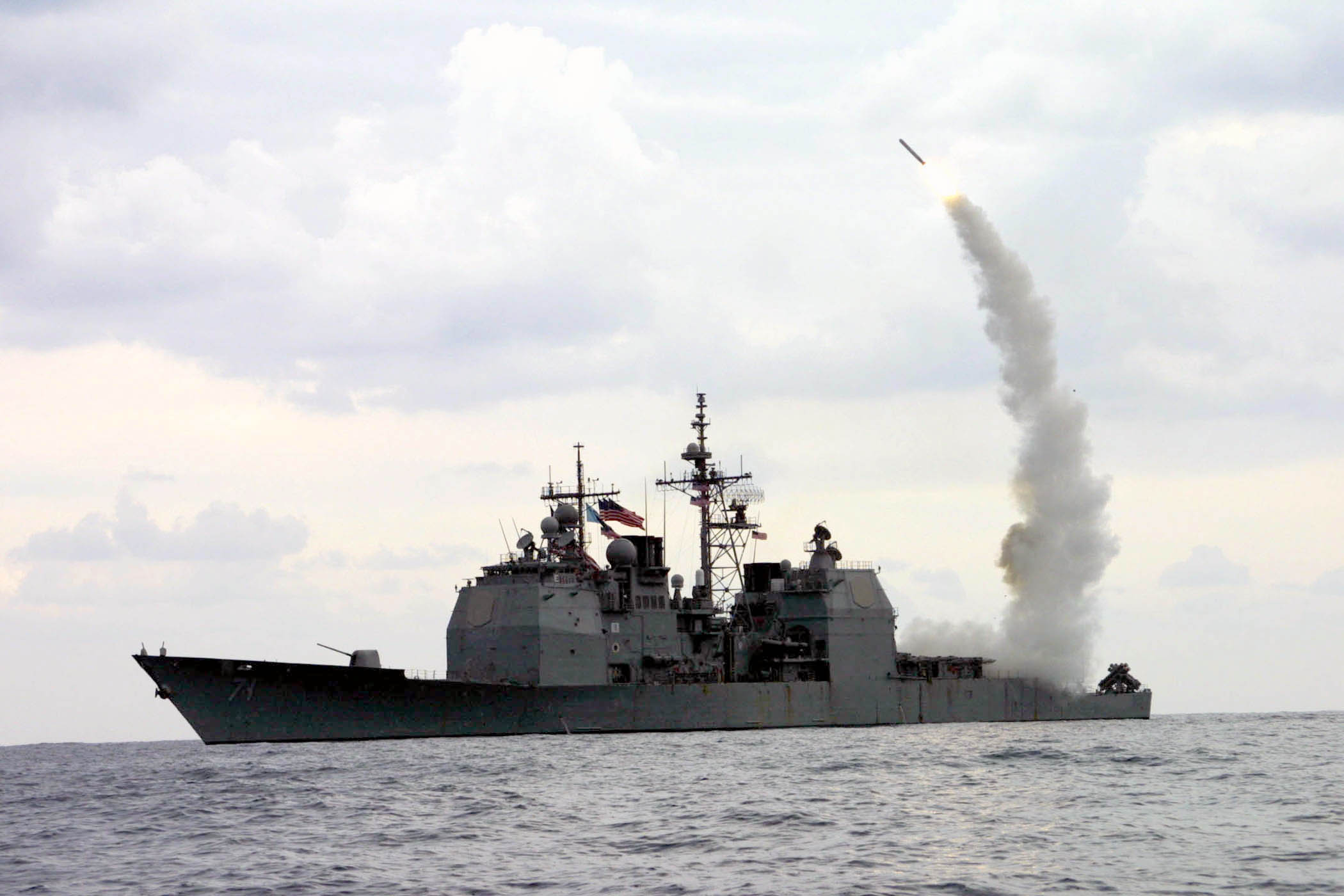
USS Cape St. George firing Tomahawk missiles near the start of Operation Iraqi Freedom in March 2003.

In March 2003, she was a first responder in support of Operation Iraqi Freedom, awaiting orders from the Mediterranean Sea, off the coast of Turkey. She was part of Cruiser-Destroyer Group 8. The helicopter squadron attached to the ship during this cruise was HSL-44 (out of Mayport Naval Station). During this deployment, Cape St. George became one of the first US Navy ships to fire cruise missiles from the Mediterranean at a target (in this case in Iraq). Cape St. George soon set sail for the Persian Gulf to continue missile-support operations after the government of Turkey claimed that a cruise missile landed, intact, on Turkish soil, resulting in US warships being forbidden from firing missiles over Turkish airspace. The Cape St. George then became the first US Navy ship ever to fire from two theaters of battle in history during her five-month cruise, the Mediterranean Sea and the Persian Gulf. The photograph of the USS Cape St. George firing its first missile at Iraq from the Mediterranean Sea was taken by one of two sailors deployed in one of the Cape's two rigid-hull inflatable boats. Video footage was also taken and was seen shortly after on CNN. The photograph made newspapers nationwide soon after and is now the Cape's token photograph.

In May 2005, Cape St. George became the first surface warship certified to use only digital nautical charts, instead of paper charts using the Voyage Management System (VMS). About 12,000 paper charts have been replaced by 29 computer discs. VMS is part of the Smart Ship Integrated Bridge System, which has been under development since 1990.

On 18 March 2006, she was involved in a firefight with suspected pirates, along with USS Gonzalez. The two US warships exchanged fire with the suspected pirates about 25 nautical miles (46 km; 29 mi) off the coast of Somalia. Initial reports indicated that one suspected pirate was killed and five others wounded, while Cape St. George took superficial damage from small-arms fire during the action.

In March 2007, Seaman Richard Mott slashed the throat of Seaman Jose Garcia from behind as the 18-year-old ate breakfast on the berthing barge nested aside the ship, while she was pierside at BAE Shipyards Norfolk, Virginia, for repairs. Garcia was seriously injured, but survived. On 7 November 2008, Mott was found guilty of attempted murder and was sentenced to 12 years in prison.

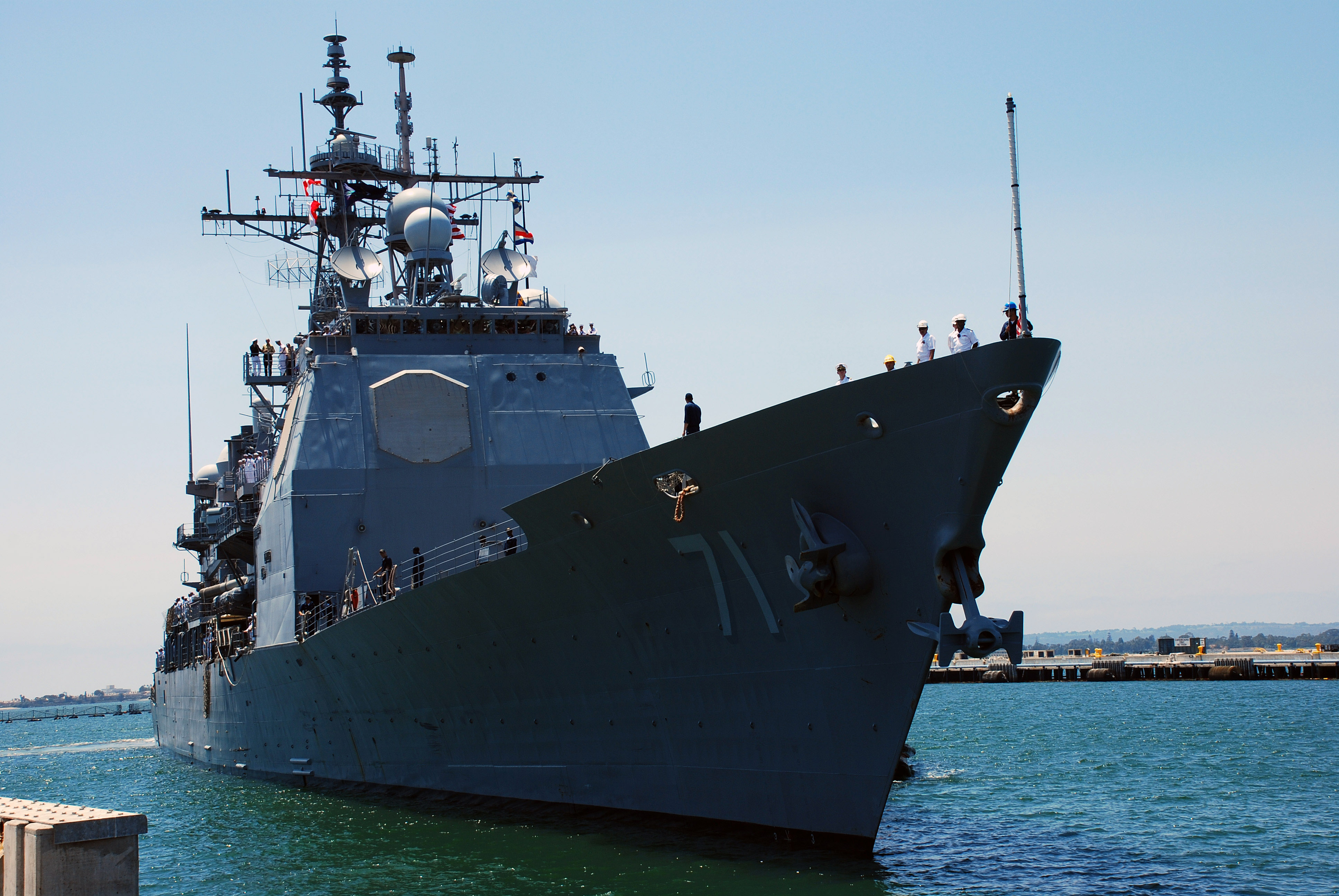
USS Cape St. George arrives at her new homeport in San Diego, 30 July 2007.

In July 2007, Cape St. George departed Norfolk in transit to her new homeport of San Diego, California as part of the realignment of naval forces following the 2006 Quadrennial Defense Review.

On 17 October 2010, the aircraft carrier USS Abraham Lincoln (CVN-72) and Cape St. George arrived off the coast of Pakistan to support the coalition troop surge in landlocked Afghanistan.

On 31 January 2011, Cape St. George responded to a distress call from a sinking Iranian dhow by dispatching a rescue team via a rigid-hulled inflatable boat. The rescue team attempted to repair the dhow's bilge pumps, but they were unable to stop the flooding. The Iranian fishermen were brought aboard Cape St. George, where they were examined by the medical staff before being transferred to an Iranian customs vessel.

On 6–10 January 2012, accompanying carrier Abraham Lincoln, Cape St. George visited the Gulf of Thailand port of Laem Chabang. During the visit, Singapore-based Glenn Defense Marine Asia (GDMA) provided husbanding services, for which the Navy was billed a total of $884,000. In November 2013, federal prosecutors charged that the Navy had been overbilled more than $500,000.

In October 2019 it was announced that Cape St. George would be shifting to Seattle, WA to complete a Depot Level Modernization Period at Vigor Marine's Harbor Island facility starting in December 2019. Cape St. George arrived in Seattle in August 2020. After the modernization was completed, Cape St. George was moved to its new home port of Naval Base San Diego on 22 April 2025.

== Awards ==
- Navy Unit Commendation - (March 1994-April 1995, May 2000 – May 2001, November 2005-May 2006, Dec 2011-Aug 2012)
- Navy Meritorious Unit Commendation (Jun-Dec 1998, Sep 2010-Mar 2011)
- Navy E Ribbon - (1993, 1994, 1997, 1998, 2000, 2002, 2015)
- Armed Forces Expeditionary Medal x3
- Iraq Campaign Medal x2
- Armed Forces Service Medal x3
- Coast Guard Special Operations Service Ribbon
- NATO Medal
- James F. Chezek Memorial Gunnery Award - (1996, 1998)
- Arizona Memorial Trophy – (1995)
- SIXTH Fleet "Hook 'Em" award for Anti-Submarine Warfare excellence - (1995)
