= Jean Rose =

French pirate (fl. 1680–1688)

Jean Rose (Note: First name also John or Jonathan, last name occasionally Row or Rowe.) (fl. 1680–1688) was a French pirate and buccaneer active against the Spanish in Central and South America.

== History ==
In early 1680 Rose joined John Coxon, Cornelius Essex, Robert Allison, Thomas Magott, and Bartholomew Sharpe who aimed to sack Puerto Bello: “As we weare Coming out of Portamorrant, about 6 Leagues from the Port, we meetts with a french Brickanteen, on[e] John Row Commander. he understanding our Designe, was willing to Concert with us,” and they soon added fellow French rover Jean Bernanos. Coxon had a commission but sailed well outside its parameters and time limits, which left the fleet branded as pirates rather than privateers. After taking the town the English buccaneers wanted to march overland to Panama's Pacific coast. The French crews balked and so they separated: “all our English concluded to goe, but capt Lessoone (Note: Bernanos, using a pseudonym.) and capt Jno. Rowe their Peopple refus'd, being man'd all with French.”

Rose joined other buccaneers in subsequent years, raiding Spanish settlements and using Tortuga as a base to cruise off Caracas. He was part of a group which planned to sail under Michel de Grammont in 1684, then partnered with Michiel Andrieszoon and others until early 1685. That February a large group of French rovers including Rose, Mathurin Desmarestz, and Pierre le Picard, plus Andrieszoon and others joined forces, crossing Panama overland where they joined Francois Grogniet and Jean L'Escuyer. Alongside English forces under Edward Davis, William Knight, Charles Swan, Francis Townley, and Peter Harris they looted Chepo and attempted to capture a Spanish treasure fleet. The attack failed and when some of the English blamed Grogniet and the French for the debacle, the fleet broke up. After raiding Leon, Realejo, and other towns Davis elected to return to the Caribbean and Rose likely sailed back with him.

== See also ==
- Raveneau de Lussan - French adventurer who joined the 1685 raid and left a detailed journal of their activities
