= Robert Allison (pirate) =

Pirate

Robert Allison (Note: Last name also Allisson, Alleston, or Alliston.) (fl. 1679–1699) was a buccaneer, privateer, and pirate best known for assaulting Spanish Puerto Bello as part of a large flotilla of rovers.

== History ==
Allison sailed his unarmed 25-man, 18-toon sloop to Port Morant, Jamaica in late 1679 to meet with fellow captains John Coxon, Bartholomew Sharpe, Thomas Magott, and Cornelius Essex. The Franco-Dutch War had ended the previous year; Coxon had a commission only to cut logwood but forged it to appear as a privateering commission against the Spanish. The following January the fleet sailed toward Puerto Bello, and joining with French buccaneers Jean Rose and Jean Bernanos along the way, fell on the city that February. Allison commanded the “Forlorn” (vanguard) unit which routed the Spanish defenders: “wee made what hast wee could into the towne, the forloorne being led by capt. Robert Alliston, the rest of our party following upp so fast as they could.” Allison was sent to recall the remaining offshore privateers, whose timely appearance stopped a Spanish counterattack, and soon helped capture an approaching Spanish ship. The buccaneers had spent days looting the town; despite its thorough sacking by Henry Morgan only 12 years earlier, between Puerto Bello and the captured ship they secured enough treasure to share 100 pieces of eight per man.

The buccaneer fleet sailed to Bocas del Toro to refit, where they were joined by Richard Sawkins, Peter Harris, and others. After the French contingent departed in April, the rest elected to march overland to assault Panama City. William Dampier, Lionel Wafer, and Basil Ringrose were present and recorded the subsequent events in journals and books they would publish upon their return. Magott and Allison had fallen ill and remained with their ships. The marching buccaneers organized themselves with flags unique to each captain; some of Allison’s and Magott’s men marched under Coxon, and “had each of them a red flag,” “most of them ... armed with fuzee, pistol, and hanger.”

Allison spent the 1680s in New York. From there he organized expeditions to Jamaica where he smuggled goods to and from Honduras and the Yucatán. He opposed the revolution started by Jacob Leisler, who would soon be executed for treason.

His movements were quiet until 1697 when he was recorded as supercargo of the Fortune under Thomas Mostyn when they called at Adam Baldridge’s pirate trading post at Madagascar. Baldridge later testified:

14 June 1697. Arrived the ship Fortune from New York, Captain Thomas Mostyn Commander, and Robert Allison Super Cargo, the Ship Burden 150 Tons or there abouts, 8 Guns, near 20 men, haveing severall sorts of goods aboard, and sold to Captain Hore and Company and to the White men upon Madagascar.

Fortune was seized upon its return to New York. Its voyage was used as evidence against Governor Benjamin Fletcher who was removed from office over charges of consorting with pirates.

In October 1698 the Company of Scotland employed Allison as a pilot for their ships approaching Darién to establish a colony. The colonists arrived in November to establish their settlement. Allison remained with them until February 1699 when he sailed again as a supercargo aboard one of their ships which returned to Jamaica for supplies. The colony was wiped out within the year by disease and Spanish troops; Allison was “sadly old, white haired, and garrulous” by this time and was not heard from again.

== See also ==
- Edmund Cooke – Another buccaneer on Sharpe's expedition.
