= Duncan Mackintosh =

17th-century pirate (died c. 1689)

Duncan Mackintosh (Note: Last name also Macintosh, Makintosh, Mackantrash, or Mackindes.) (died 1689?) was a pirate who cruised the East Indies, the Indian Ocean, and the coast of Africa.

== History ==
Buccaneer John Eaton sailed for the East Indies aboard his ship Nicholas after raiding the Pacific Coast of Spanish South America. There he met with great success looting Chinese, Japanese, and Dutch shipping. In 1686 he made his way to eastern India where his crew split up. Eaton may have died there or returned to England; some of his sailors went ashore to serve the Mughals, while others elected to continue their piracy. Those who remained on the Indian Ocean soon captured an East India Company ketch named Good Hope which they decided to keep. The ship's mate, Duncan Mackintosh, was their only navigator and they convinced him to join them, electing him Captain.

Mackintosh (Note: Some sources claim he took the assumed name Thompson when he began his pirate career.) took Good Hope to the Nicobars, Malacca, Côn Đảo, Borneo, Singapore, Johor, and finally back to Madras. They had mixed success between their various stops, capturing some vessels by flying false flags but running from others who resisted too strongly. The pirates lost several sailors along the way to various causes including native attacks. Among the prisoners they took were some Spanish and Portuguese men who had already been captured by pirates: they had once been taken by buccaneers serving under William Dampier, who had also raided Spanish South America under Captains Swan, Cook, Davis, and Read. They considered marooning some of their prisoners, threatening to feed them to cannibals rumored to inhabit the Andaman Islands. A group of their captives planned to mutiny and retake Good Hope but were discovered and marooned near Sukadana.

After stopping at Madagascar to replenish their stores, they sailed around the Cape of Africa into the Atlantic, raiding up the African coast before heading west to Brazil. Near the mouth of the Amazon the pirates debated marooning or executing their Spanish prisoners; Mackintosh and a few officers convinced the crew to give the prisoners a captured ship and release them. Alonso Ramírez, one of the captives, recorded Mackintosh's speech leading to his and his fellow prisoners' release:

It is enough that we have become degenerate, robbing the Orient of its best, in unholy ways. Are not the many innocents, the fruits of whose sweat and toil we took, and whose lives we stole, not clamoring to the Heavens? Think now, what has this poor Spaniard done to deserve losing his? He has served us as a slave, grateful even for what we have done with him since his capture. To leave him on this river where, I believe, only barbarous Indians live is ingratitude; to cut his throat, as some of you advise, would be worse than impiety. Lest his innocent blood cry out to the entire world, I and those who stand with me are now prepared to become their protectors.

Returning to the west African coast, Mackintosh and some others were caught, tried, and hanged at Cape Corso in Guinea around 1689. The remaining crew and Good Hope escaped, the ship being reported back at Madagascar later in 1689 “with a good store of gold and diamonds” but with few crewmen left aboard.

== See also ==
- The Misfortunes of Alonso Ramírez - A memorial by Ramírez detailing his capture and ill treatment at the pirates' hands.
