= Jean L'Escuyer =

French pirate

Jean L’Escuyer
- Occupation: Pirate
- Years active: 1685
- Known for: Sailed and fought alongside a number of prominent buccaneers
- Piratical career
- Base of operations: Pacific coast of Central America
- Commands: San Rosario

Jean L’Escuyer (fl. 1685) was a French pirate active on the Pacific coast of Central America. He sailed and fought alongside a number of prominent buccaneers such as Edward Davis, Francois Grogniet, William Dampier, and others.

== History ==
L’Escuyer 11-gun vessel sailed alongside Francois Grogniet in 1685 when they led a large contingent of flibustiers (French buccaneers) and a few English to join a growing group of Englishmen under Captains Charles Swan, Townley, Davis, and others. The Frenchmen had arrived in canoes and open boats after marching across Panama. Davis granted them the captured Spanish prize ship San Rosario, which still had with over 300 Frenchmen aboard.

There are varying accounts of L’Escuyer’s involvement in subsequent events. The account of Raveneau de Lussan, leader of another group of French flibustiers who joined the group a few months later, indicates that L’Escuyer’s crew “had recently lost their captain” and that the San Rosario was under the sole command of Grogniet. This account would place L’Escuyer’s death in mid-1685.

Other accounts claim that L’Escuyer was part of the French contingent from that point forward, participating in the blockade of Panama, the group’s failure to capture the Spanish treasure fleet, and their sack of Guayaquil.

He was also with them when the Spanish burned their ships at Quibo, and for their subsequent attacks on Nicaragua, alongside Townley. Whether L’Escuyer stayed with Grogniet or left with other Frenchmen who followed Pierre le Picard is not recorded.

== See also ==
- Mathurin Desmarestz, a French buccaneer who survived the same campaign as L’Escuyer and went on to have a pirate career of his own.
