= William Knight (pirate) =

English buccaneer

William Knight (fl. 1684–1689) was a 17th-century English buccaneer and pirate known for joining privateering expeditions against Spanish colonies in Central and South America.

== History ==
Knight may have lived in Port Royal, Jamaica since 1675, but by September 1684 he and 50 men set out to raid the Spanish, crossing the Isthmus of Panama, building canoes once they reached the Pacific coast. Some of his sailors became separated, joining with Francis Townley, Edward Davis, and Charles Swan, as well as French buccaneers under Francois Grogniet and Jean L’Escuyer. Knight and the rest of his crew cruised off El Salvador and Ecuador then joined the larger group in March 1685.

The buccaneers engaged a Spanish fleet in June but were forced to retreat. The English and French contingents blamed each other and subsequently separated after a failed assault on Remedios. Knight, Swan, Townley, and Peter Harris left in July to attack Nicaragua, sacking León and Realejo but with little to show for it.

Davis and Knight left for Peru in September, raiding up and down the coast into 1686. That March they raided Sana, taking over 100,000 pesos (£25,000). This was one of the richest captures of the buccaneer era. A raid at Paita was less successful but they picked up additional crew when almost 40 freed slaves joined them. They continued their raids into the summer, collecting another £5,000 in July as a ransom to spare Pisco. After dividing their loot at the Juan Fernandez Islands on November (where each man received 5000 pieces of eight, or £1,250), Knight returned to the Caribbean via Cape Horn. Davis’ crew elected to stay in the Pacific and continue their raids, having lost much of treasure gambling; they looted Arica in Chile then assisted a French contingent under Pierre Le Picard in taking Guayaquil.

Knight possibly settled in Virginia afterwards, though in 1688 he was called to give testimony in Jamaica against French buccaneers who had sailed with Townley. English explorer and buccaneer William Dampier (who had sailed with Davis) reported a “Captain Knight” active in the Indian Ocean in 1689, who consorted with some of Swan's crew from the Cygnet. They cruised off Acheen and Johanna before putting some crew off at Coromandel. Given the dates and the association with Dampier, Davis, and Swan's crew, this may have been William Knight.

== See also ==
- Henry Morgan – Legendary buccaneer whose example other raiders followed
