= Jean Bernanos =

Jean Bernanos (Note: Last name also Bournano, full name and title “Jean, Sieur de Bernanos.” He also used the alias Lessone or Lassonde.) (b. c. 1648 - d. 1695) was a French buccaneer, privateer, and pirate active in the Caribbean and across Spanish Central America.

== History ==
Born in France, Bernanos moved to Saint-Domingue where he cruised against the Spanish in 1677 without success. He may have joined other buccaneers such as William Wright in various adventures over the next two years. In a 6-gun, 86-ton, 100-man vessel he sailed against Chepo in Panama in late 1679 but was repulsed by Spanish defenses despite help from native tribes. At the San Blas Islands he joined an English expedition led by John Coxon alongside Robert Allison, Thomas Magott, Cornelius Essex, and others who collaborated to sack Spanish Puerto Bello. The buccaneers looked for a new target and Bernanos suggested allying with the natives near Darién based on their willingness to help against the Spanish. He sailed with the flotilla to Costa Rica but when they elected to march overland to take Panama instead, he and fellow French rover Jean Rose (“Captain Row”) broke off from the English pirates:

Upon these and other reasons which they gave us, we concluded to desist from the journey of Tocamora and to proceed to Panama. Having taken these resolutions, Captain Bournano's and Captain Row's vessels separated from us, as being all French and not willing to go to Panama, they declared themselves generally against a long march by land.

Bernanos operated out of Petit-Goâve in the 1680s. Commanding a 60-man, 6-gun vessel in 1684, he sailed to Venezuela's Orinoco River alongside Rose, Francois Grogniet, and others to capture Santo Tomé. The privateers took little booty but remained there for a few months before Bernanos returned to his wife and home at Port-de-Paix. The Governor employed him as a privateer during the Nine Years' War, during which he captured several ships and participated in multiple expeditions against France's enemies. He was killed in 1695 while defending settlements in Saint-Domingue against a raid by English and Spanish troops, after which Governor Jean-Baptiste du Casse took in Bernanos’ children.

== See also ==
- Richard Sawkins and Peter Harris - English buccaneers who replaced Bournano and Rose for the Panama raid
