= John Cook (pirate) =

British pirate of the 17th century

John Cook (died 1684) was an English buccaneer, privateer, and pirate.

== History ==
In 1679, when he was still a merchant captain, Cook abandoned his ship on the island of Bonaire to escape the Spanish. He then joined the assembly of buccaneers serving under Bartholomew Sharpe. The fleet separated in 1681 after disagreements between Captains Sharpe, John Coxon, and John Watling; Cook led a group electing to leave the South Seas and return to the West Indies. Among the sailors joining him were surgeon Lionel Wafer and navigator William Dampier.

Cooke then sailed with the crew of William Wright and Jan Willems (aka "Yankey"), serving as quartermaster until granted command of a ship they had taken. Unfortunately, the French authorities of Santo Domingo confiscated the ship for piracy because he had failed to obtain a privateering commission.

In 1682 Cook and a few men (including Edward Davis) joined the French captain Jean Tristan, whose boat he stole and sailed to the west coast of Santo Domingo. While back in the Caribbean Cook and other buccaneers were protected by Adolph Esmit, Danish Governor of St. Thomas. With his new ship Cook captured two others, one of which became his personal ship which he renamed Revenge after returning to Virginia to refit and sell their captured prizes.

Leaving Virginia in 1683 with a crew of 70 (with Davis, Dampier, Wafer, and now Ambrose Cowley as well), Cook sailed to the Guinea coast off western Africa. With more than 70 men under his command he arranged a ruse, pretending to lead a wayward merchant vessel to capture a large Danish ship which he kept and renamed Bachelor's or Bachelor's Delight. He took his new ship to the South Sea via the Strait of Magellan in 1684. That January they recorded sighting a "phantom island" which Cowley named Pepys Island.

Cook joined then with English buccaneer John Eaton in March, visiting the Galapagos Islands where Dampier made many observations of flora and fauna. Cook soon took ill and died aboard Bachelor's Delight in the Gulf of Nicoya near Cabo Blanco, Costa Rica in July 1684. The crew then unanimously elected Edward Davis as new leader of the expedition.

== See also ==
- John Read, another sailor aboard Cook and Davis' expedition who later became a Captain.
