= Francis Townley =

English buccaneer

Francis Townley (died 1686) was an English buccaneer, privateer, and pirate active against the Spanish on the Pacific coast of Central and South America.

== History ==
Townley first appeared in the Pacific in March 1685 with 180 men aboard two captured Spanish ships, where he met up with a portion of William Knight's crew. Early the next year they joined forces with French corsairs under Francois Grogniet and Jean L’Escuyer, who had recently joined with another English contingent under Charles Swan in Cygnet and Edward Davis in Batchelor's Delight. Together they raided Leon and Realejo before separating.

Near Acapulco Swan and Townley attempted to capture a treasure galleon from Manila but found it too well protected and were forced to withdraw. After this unprofitable foray with Swan, Townley's force sailed back south alone and raided Granada alongside Grogniet's flotilla before the group again broke up. Having had little success under Grogniet, some of the French sailors elected to join Townley. That July they sacked Panama, taking fantastic treasure but losing much of it to a Spanish counterattack. Townley sent the heads of some hostages to Spanish leaders to force them into supplying the buccaneers with food, and threatened more hostage deaths if the Spanish failed to release some buccaneer prisoners.

In August the Spanish launched a surprise assault on Townley's forces at sea but were badly defeated. Townley executed more prisoners and the Spanish paid a large ransom, but Townley, wounded in the previous engagement, soon died. After his body was cast overboard the buccaneers elected George D’Hout to be their new commander. (Note: At least one source says Pierre le Picard was elected as commander; he had been part of the French contingent under Grogniet, so he may have been made commander only of the remaining Frenchmen.)

== See also ==
- John Read (pirate) - elected Captain of Cygnet after a mutiny against Swan.
