= Edmund Cooke (pirate) =

English buccaneer

- “The seventh was led by Captain Edmond Cook with red Colours striped with yellow, with a Hand and Sword for his devise”
- Other name: Edward / Edmond or Cook
- Occupation: Pirate
- Years active: 1673–1683
- Known for: Sailing against the Spanish alongside Bartholomew Sharp, John Coxon, Basil Ringrose, Lionel Wafer, and other famous buccaneers
- Piratical career
- Commands: Virgin

Edmund Cooke (fl. 1673–1683, also named Edward / Edmond or Cook) was a merchant captain, buccaneer, and pirate. He is best known for sailing against the Spanish alongside Bartholomew Sharp, John Coxon, Basil Ringrose, Lionel Wafer, and other famous buccaneers. Cooke's flag was red-and-yellow striped and featured a hand holding a sword.

== Career ==
=== Merchant ===
Cooke's 130-ton merchant vessel Virgin was bound to Jamaica from London when Irish pirate Philip Fitzgerald, who was serving the Spanish in the Caribbean, seized it in May 1673. Fitzgerald accused Cooke of transporting logwood – which the Spanish considered contraband – and took the Virgin to Havana for condemnation as a prize ship. Cooke and his crew were put into a small boat with few provisions and it took them over two months to make their way back to Jamaica. For over a year he protested to Spanish officials in the Caribbean and in Europe to no avail. He also petitioned King Charles II for a privateering commission so he could take restitution from the Spanish by force: “and if thereupon satisfaction or reparation be denied or unreasonably delayed above four months after his arrival there, his Majesty will grant letters of reprisal to petitioner and his merchants that they may recover satisfaction for their said losses, together with the interest and charges, according to the law of nations.” His privateering requests were delayed and repeatedly denied.

In mid-1673 an “Edmund Cooke” led a mutiny aboard the trading vessel St. Anthony. Whether this is the same Edmond Cooke is not known, though the events fit the pattern of his later activities. The St. Anthony sailed from Lisbon but the mutineers took it to New England, sailing into the Piscataqua River. They tried to dispose of the ship's cargo near Plymouth but were caught and tried. They were convicted but pardoned in December 1673.

By 1679 Cooke was back in the Caribbean hauling logwood when he was caught by Spanish warships off Aruba. He and his crew abandoned their ship to avoid capture, preferring "to sacrifice their ship rather than fall into the hands of the Spaniards, by whom they knew so many to have been ill treated and undone." They waited ashore on Aruba until an 80-ton Spanish barque approached, which they boarded and captured. Cooke sailed the barque back to Jamaica, where he sold off its cargo and decided to take up privateering against the Spanish.

=== Buccaneer ===
He joined a flotilla of buccaneers led by John Coxon and Bartholomew Sharpe which sailed from Jamaica to Puerto Bello in 1680. Among his crew was surgeon Lionel Wafer, who would later write a detailed account of the expedition. Cooke was sent ahead to a rendezvous by Coxon and encountered a Spanish slave ship en route. His crew disagreed on whether to seize it or ignore it and the Spaniard escaped; Coxon then advised the buccaneers to set out in canoes and periaguas before the Spanish ship could report their activities.

Richard Sawkins commanded the expedition from the flagship Trinity (La Trinidad or Santissima Trinidad), attempting to capture ships traveling between Lima and Panama. Sharpe took over when Sawkins was killed; when a party of sixty men refused to serve under Sharpe, Cooke was given the captured 100-ton barque Mayflower to return the men downriver. Some records claim Cooke refused to act as their captain, while others say the men demanded Cooke be removed as captain. In the end Cooke left the Mayflower and went aboard the Trinity with Sharpe, while a friend of Sharp's named John Cox was given the Mayflower.

Sharpe's crew mutinied, placing John Watling in command of the Trinity. After a disastrous raid on Arica in which Watling was killed, the crew asked Sharpe to resume command of the Trinity. Cooke's servant William was suspected of collaborating with Spanish captives and was imprisoned and died aboard ship in early 1681; he had also accused his master Edmund of buggery, causing him to be imprisoned as well. Ringrose wrote that “This day likewise William Cook, servant unto Captain Edmund Cook, confessed that his Master had oft times Buggered him in England, leaving his Wife and coming to bed to him the said William. That the same crime he had also perpetrated in Jamaica; and once in these Seas before Panama.” Sharpe also suspected Cooke of being involved in the mutiny which had placed Watling in command.

When the buccaneers finally returned to the Caribbean in 1682, Cooke was among the party who petitioned the governor of Antigua for permission to come ashore. His further activities are not recorded, though it is possible he continued his piracy. In 1683 Governor William Stapleton of the Leeward Islands wrote to London that “Captain Carlile goes this very day to look for one Cooke (Note: This may instead have been John Cook, who had been in the same area at the same time and had been protected by the Governor of St. Thomas.) and one Bond, two English pirates fitted from Saint Thomas. I have furnished him with men and powder lest he should be overpowered. He should be able to hunt them all down.”

== See also ==
- Henry Morgan, buccaneer who raided some of the same locations as Sharpe's expedition and who was Governor of Jamaica when they returned.
