= Cornelius Essex =

English pirate

Cornelius Essex (Note: First name also Corneles, Cornelies, or Cornelyes.) (fl. 1679-1680) was a buccaneer and privateer best known for sacking Spanish Puerto Bello as part of a larger contingent of pirates.

== History ==
In August 1679 Essex was among a group of pirates who attacked Spanish traders in the Bay of Honduras, looting indigo and other cargo. His vessel Great Dolphin was captured after attacking an English homestead on Jamaica and he was put on trial with 20 of his crew. Two of them were sentenced to hang but Essex was not. The Jamaican Assembly pleaded with the Governor “in view of the many depredations committed by pirates and privateers, to take some speedy and effectual course for putting an end to the same.”

Essex sailed his barque to Port Morant, Jamaica in December 1679 to join John Coxon, Bartholomew Sharpe, Robert Allison, and Thomas Magott in planning an assault on Puerto Bello. En route Essex’s vessel was leaking so badly his crew was forced to wrap the hull with hawsers to keep it intact: “his vessell being ould gave way in her boue [bow] that if shee had not been wolded, Could never a he[ld] together.”

They attempted to justify the attack under privateering commissions; these were forgeries and the attack was in fact piracy. The flotilla joined with French buccaneers Rose and Bournano but Sharpe and Essex missed the rendezvous, Essex meeting them at Golden Islands days later. Together they took the town in February 1680, capturing enough treasure to afford each man 100 pieces of eight. Afterwards the buccaneers regrouped at Boca del Toro to prepare for an assault on Panama, though Essex was not mentioned in the many accounts of the Panama expedition.

Some modern sources claim Essex was killed during the attack on Puerto Bello. However, a buccaneer witness confirmed that Essex survived but left his leaky vessel behind - “Capt. Essex leaveing his Barkque their she being so rotten” - after which he likely joined with Coxon or one of the other captains. He returned to Jamaica in 1682 and soon left for New York as a passenger aboard a sloop which was itself plundered by pirates.

== See also ==
- William Dampier, Lionel Wafer, and Basil Ringrose - all three were present on the Panama expedition and wrote journals and books documenting it on their return
