= Sawkins =

Sawkins is a surname. Notable people with the surname include:

- James G. Sawkins (1806–1878), British artist, geologist, copper miner, and illustrator
- Raymond Harold Sawkins (1923–2006), British novelist
- Richard Sawkins (died 1680), British buccaneer
