= Thomas Magott =

English minor pirate and privateer

Thomas Magott (Note: Last name also Maggott, Macket, or Mackett.) (fl. 1679–1680) was a minor pirate and privateer best known for joining a group of buccaneers in assaulting Spanish Puerto Bello.

== History ==
In late 1679 Magott met with captains John Coxon, Bartholomew Sharpe, Robert Allison, and Cornelius Essex. His vessel, the smallest one in the fleet, was an unarmed 20-man, 14-ton sloop. Using Coxon's forged privateering commission the fleet sailed to Puerto Bello, and alongside the two French buccaneers Rose and Bournano, sacked the city in February 1680.

After refitting at Bocas del Toro and joining with reinforcements they marched overland to attack Panama, but “capt. Allisson and capt. Maggott being sickly were unable to march” and remained behind along with a skeleton crew to guard the ships. Some of Allison's and Magott's men marched under Coxon, and “had each of them a red flag,” “most of them … armed with fuzee, pistol, and hanger.” Magott himself played no further part in their adventures.

== See also ==
- William Dampier, Lionel Wafer, and Basil Ringrose - all three were present on the expedition and wrote journals and books documenting it on their return
