= Gulf of Darién =

Southernmost region of the Caribbean Sea

- Spanish: Golfo de Darién
- The Gulf of Darién, north of the isthmus of Darién in the Caribbean Sea

- Gulf of Darién in relation to Colombia
- Location: Caribbean Sea
- Coordinates: 9°25′42″N 77°3′40″W
- Type: Gulf
- Basin countries: Colombia

The Gulf of Darién (UK: /ˈdɛəriən, ˈdær-/, US: /ˌdɛəriˈɛn, ˌdɑːr-, dɑːrˈjɛn/, Spanish: [daˈɾjen]) is the southernmost region of the Caribbean Sea, located north and east of the border between Panama and Colombia. Within the gulf is the Gulf of Urabá, a small lip of sea extending southward, between Caribana Point and Cape Tiburón, Colombia, on the southern shores of which is the port city of Turbo, Colombia. The Atrato River delta extends into the Gulf of Darién.

== The Darien Scheme ==
The Gulf of Darién was the site of the Darien scheme, autonomous Scotland's one major attempt at colonialism. The first expedition of five ships (Saint Andrew, Caledonia, Unicorn, Dolphin, and Endeavour) set sail from Leith on July 14, 1698, with around 1,200 people on board. Their orders were "to proceed to the Bay of Darien, and make the Isle called the Golden Island ... some few leagues to the leeward of the mouth of the great River of Darien ... and there make a settlement on the mainland". After calling at Madeira and the West Indies, the fleet made landfall off the coast of Darien on November 2. The settlers christened their new home "New Caledonia".

== See also ==
- Darién Gap
- Guna people
