= Davis Land =

Phantom island in the Pacific Ocean

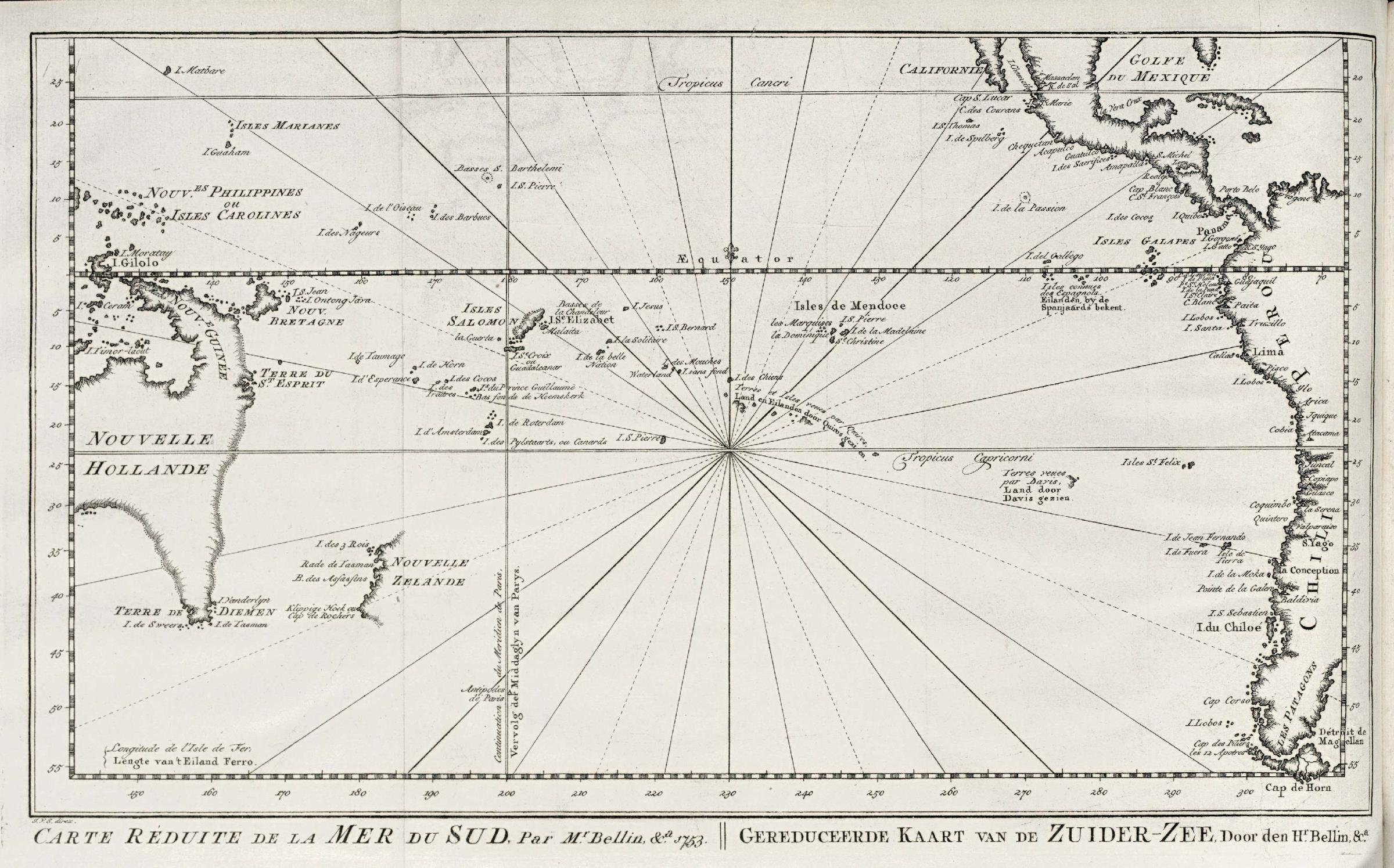
Map of the south Pacific by Jacques-Nicolas Bellin, including "Lands sawn by Davis" at about 27°S (1753)

Davis Land is the name of a phantom island that was believed to be located in the Pacific Ocean, near South America. It is named for the pirate Edward Davis, who supposedly sighted it in 1687. Never found again, it was also believed by William Dampier to possibly be the coast of Terra Australis Incognita.

== Discovery ==
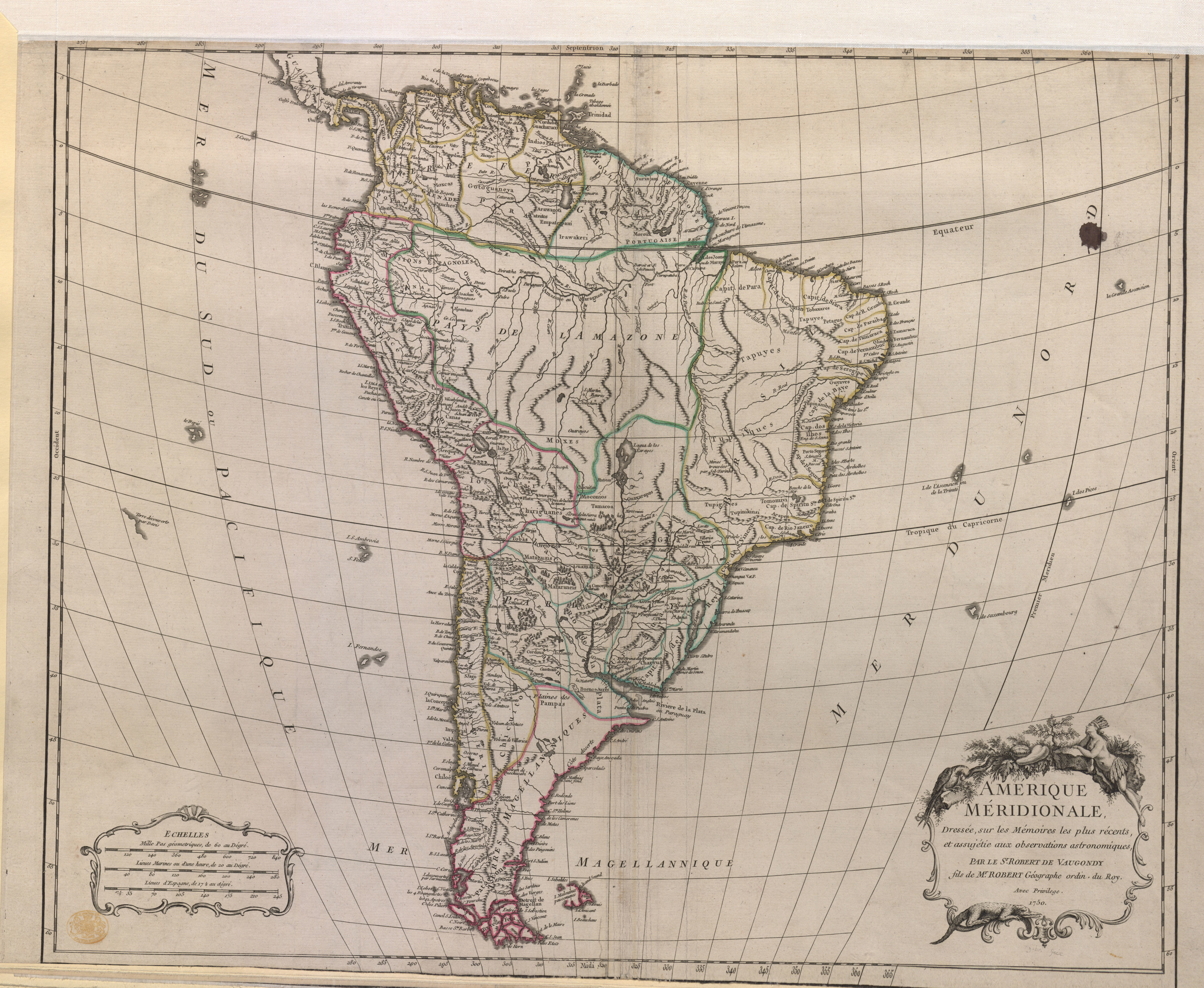
Davis Land in a 1750 map, in front of colonial Chile.

It was sighted in 1687 by Edward Davis, a pirate who was carrying out raids on Spanish settlements along the coast of Mexico, Peru, and Chile, while he was sailing in the Pacific Ocean southwards from the Galápagos Islands towards Cape Horn. He saw a low sandy island and in the distance, hills extending to the northeast. Davis made no attempt to investigate any further, more interested in continuing his voyage home.

Davis's supposed discovery was along the southern latitude of 27 to 28 degrees, which was on the same latitude as the Spanish-controlled gold mines of Copiapó. At the time, it was believed that gold could be found elsewhere along this latitude so on learning of the news of Davis Land, several navigators were instructed to seek it out on their voyages. In 1767, the French explorer Jean-François de Surville set out from Pondicherry in French India on an exploration and trading voyage with one of its objectives being to locate Davis Land and set up a trading post there. He was encouraged by rumours of the recent discovery by Samuel Wallis, of HMS Dolphin, of a rich island, inhabited by Jews. In fact, this was Tahiti, but the French conflated the discovery of "Wallis's Land" with Davis Land. Surville ended up rediscovering the Solomon Islands, made his way to the northern coast of New Zealand and then onto Peru, where he drowned seeking help for his ailing crew.

In 1770 Felipe González de Ahedo annexed Easter Island for Spain and named it Isla de San Carlos or de David. It was translated as "Davis's Island".

Never found, Davis Land was also believed by William Dampier, who had sailed with Davis for a time, to possibly be the coast of Terra Australis Incognita. By the 1770s, with the Pacific now much better known, cartographers began to remove Davis Land from their maps. Dunmore notes that it is likely that Davis had sighted the islands of San Ambrosio and San Felix, part of the Desventuradas group of islands.
