= Étienne de Montauban =

French pirate

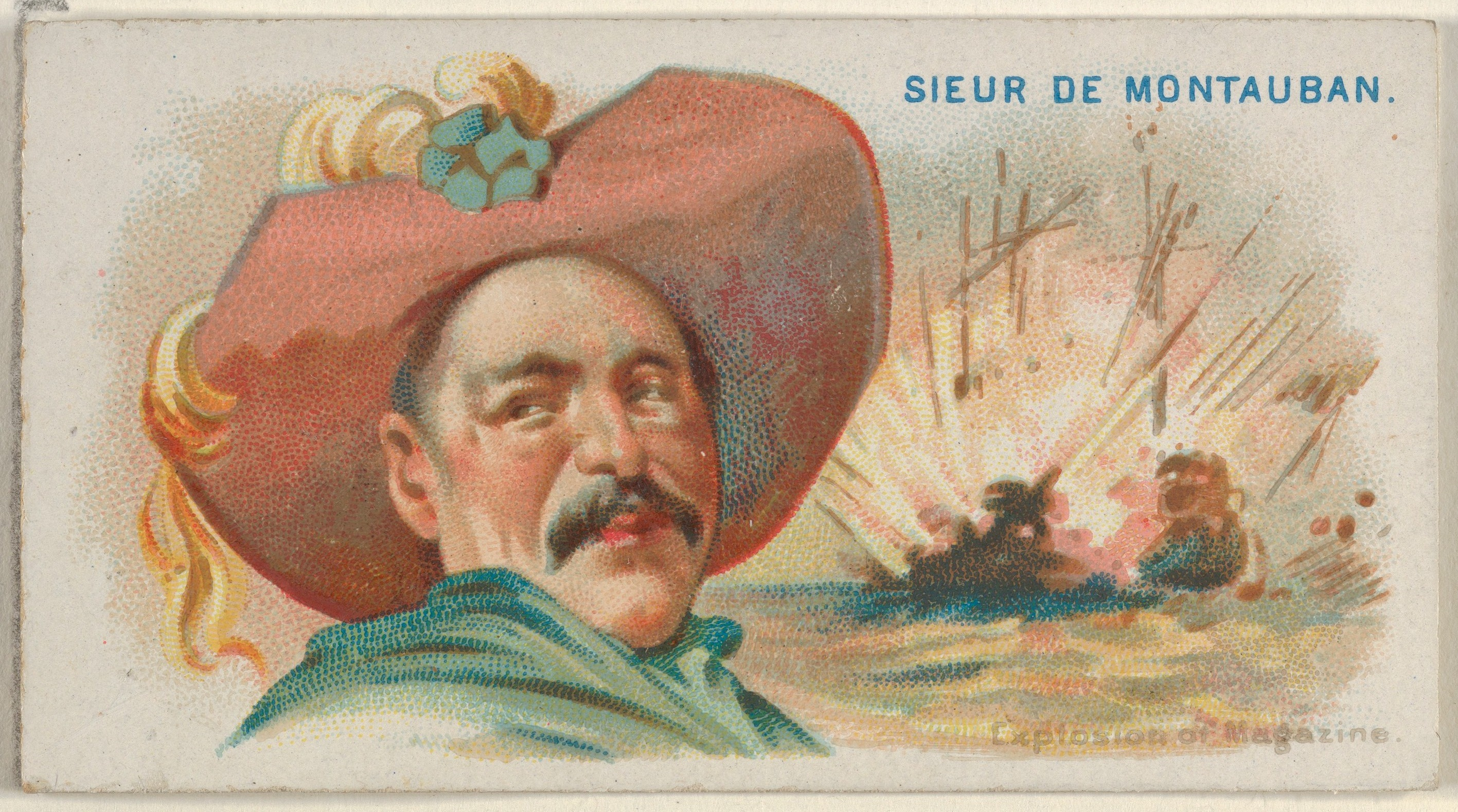
- Sieur de Montauban, Explosion of Magazine, from the Pirates of the Spanish Main series (N19) for Allen & Ginter Cigarettes MET DP835005
- Born: 1660
- Died: 1700 (aged 39–40)
- Other name: Sieur de Montauban
- Occupations: Buccaneer, privateer, and pirate
- Years active: 1691-1695
- Piratical career
- Base of operations: Caribbean and off the west African coast
- Commands: La Machine
- Later work: Writer

Étienne de Montauban (fl. 1691-1695) was a French flibustier (buccaneer), privateer, and pirate active in the Caribbean and off the west African coast. Frequently referred to as Sieur de Montauban (last name occasionally Montauband), he wrote an account of his later voyages including surviving a shipwreck.

== History ==
Born in 1660, Montauban visited the African coast as early as 1676, “having begun to use the Seas at the Age of Sixteen.” In 1690 he sailed under fellow French corsair Mathurin Desmarestz in the Caribbean. Desmarestz gave Montauban his ship La Machine after they captured a Spanish frigate, which Desmarestz kept and renamed La Ballestrelle. Montauban captained La Machine off Newfoundland in 1691 after parting with Desmarestz, where he forced some French sailors into piracy, and the same year he captured an English fort when he returned to Africa's Guinea coast.

He kept La Machine through 1694 before switching to the 200-ton, 34-gun Trois Frères (Three Brothers). That February he sailed for the coast of Venezuela, raiding off Caracas. He then intercepted an English convoy bound for London, capturing its escort Loup (Wolf) and two of the cargo ships. After capturing yet another English vessel he put into Bordeaux in September to sell off his prizes and captured cargo. While in port his crew behaved riotously: “All the Nights they spent in such Divertisements as pleased them best, and the Days in running up and down the Town in Masquerade, causing themselves to be carried in Chairs, with lighted Flambeaux's at Noon Day; of which Debauches some died, while Four of my Crew fairly deserted me.” In a hurry to depart again to preserve what crew and treasure he had left – “I thought it advisable for me to be gone from thence as soon as I could, that I might keep the rest together” – he sailed out in February 1695.

Again Montauban returned to Africa. Cruising first the Azores then the Canary Islands then Cape Verde, several vessels eluded him or fought off the Trois Frères. He managed to take an English vessel off Cape Lopez first, then a second prize before careening the Trois Frères. Off Angola he engaged a 54-gun English man-of-war which battered the Trois Frères and began a boarding action. Montauban's pirates used excellent marksmanship with musket-fire to defeat the English. Before he could board the prize the English ship's Captain set fire to its gunpowder stores, causing an enormous explosion which destroyed both ships.

Montauban was badly injured and thrown free but managed to cling to wreckage before some of his surviving sailors picked him up in a small boat. Nearly starved, they sailed to the African coast where they met natives with whom Montauban was familiar. After convincing them of his identity (“it was impossible for me to perswade any of them that I was Captain Montauban, so much was I disfigured”), he met a local prince who fed and clothed Montauban and his men, eventually escorting them to Cape Lopez where they secured passage to Barbados.

Charles de Courbon, comte de Blénac brought him and the few surviving members of his crew to Martinique in 1696. From there Montauban returned to France. Two years later he published an account of his African voyage, and wrote that “I do not know whether I have bid the Sea adieu.” Some sources report that he died in 1700, others that he continued to captain French privateer ships as late as 1708.

== See also ==
- Jean Hamlin, another French buccaneer who sailed to the coast of Africa.
