= Darien scheme =

Unsuccessful attempt by Scotland to colonize Panama

New Caledonia
- Colony of the Kingdom of Scotland
- 1698–1700
- Flag

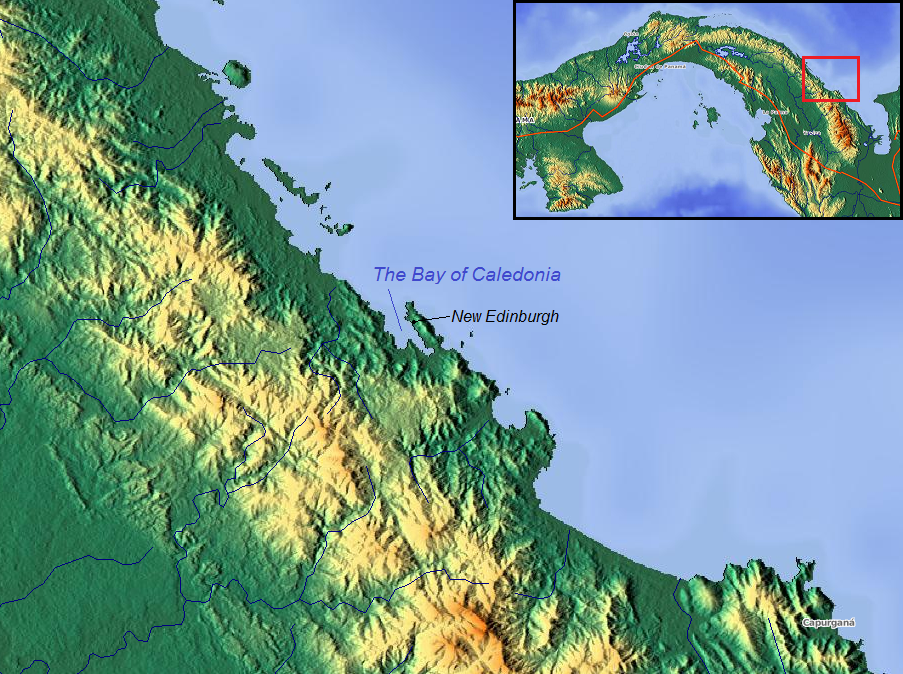
- New Caledonia on a modern map
- Capital: New Edinburgh
- Area
  - Coordinates: 8°50′3″N 77°38′0″W
  - 1698: 1 km^{2} (0.39 sq mi)
- Population
  - 1698: 1,200
  - 1700: 2,500
- Government
- Monarch
  - 1689–1702: William II
- Council
- Historical era: Colonial period
  - Landfall: 2 November 1698
  - First colony abandoned: July 1699
  - Second colony established: 30 November 1699
  - Second colony abandoned: February 1700
Preceded by	Succeeded by
Viceroyalty of New Granada	Viceroyalty of New Granada
- Today part of: Panama

The Darien venture or the Darien scheme was an unsuccessful attempt, backed largely by investors of the Kingdom of Scotland, to gain wealth and influence by establishing New Caledonia or Britain-in-Panama, a colony in the Darién Gap on the territory of present-day Panama and northern Colombia, in the late 1690s. The plan was for the colony, located on the Gulf of Darién, to establish and manage an overland route to connect the Pacific and Atlantic Oceans. The backers knew that the first sighting of the Pacific Ocean by Vasco Núñez de Balboa was after crossing the isthmus through Darién. The expedition also claimed sovereignty over "Crab Isle" (modern day Vieques, Puerto Rico) in 1698, yet sovereignty was short-lived. The settlement attempt failed; more than 80 percent of participants died within a year, and the settlement was abandoned twice.

There are many potential explanations for the failure, including poor planning and provisioning; divided leadership; a lack of trade with local indigenous tribes or neighbouring Dutch and English colonies; epidemics of tropical disease; widespread opposition to the scheme from commercial interests in England; and a failure to anticipate a military response from the Spanish Empire, who were claiming the area. The settlement was abandoned in March 1700 after a siege by Spanish forces that also blockaded the harbour.

As the Company of Scotland was backed by approximately 20 percent of all the money circulating in Scotland, its failure left the entire Scottish Lowlands in financial ruin. This was an important factor in weakening resistance to the Act of Union (completed in 1707).

The land where the Darien colony was built is located in the modern territory of Guna Yala.

== Origins ==
The late 17th century was a difficult period for Scotland, as it was for much of the rest of Europe; the years 1695–1697 saw catastrophic famine in present-day Estonia, Finland, Latvia, Norway and Sweden, plus an estimated two million deaths in France and Northern Italy. The 1690s were Scotland's coldest decade in the past 750 years, as documented in tree-ring records.

Scotland's economy was relatively small, its range of exports was limited, and it was in a weak position in relation to England, its powerful neighbour (with which it was in personal but not yet political union). In an era of economic rivalry in Europe, Scotland was incapable of protecting itself from the effects of English competition and legislation. The kingdom had no reciprocal export trade and its once-thriving industries such as shipbuilding were in deep decline; goods that were in demand had to be bought from England for sterling. Moreover, the Navigation Acts further increased economic dependence on England by limiting Scotland's shipping, and the Royal Scots Navy was relatively small. Although the unusual cold affected much of the Northern Hemisphere, Scotland suffered disproportionately and lost 10–15% of its entire population, possibly because of its political isolation. A series of domestic conflicts, including the 1639–51 Wars of the Three Kingdoms and unrest related to religious differences between 1670–1690, exhausted the people and diminished their resources. The so-called "seven ill years" of the 1690s saw widespread crop failures and famine, while Scotland's deteriorating economic position led to calls for a political or customs union with England. However, the stronger feeling among Scots was that the country should become a great mercantile and colonial power in the manner of England.

In response, several solutions were enacted by the Parliament of Scotland: in 1695 the Bank of Scotland was established; the Act for the Settling of Schools created a parish-based system of public education throughout Scotland; and the Company of Scotland was chartered with capital to be raised by public subscription to trade with "Africa and the Indies".

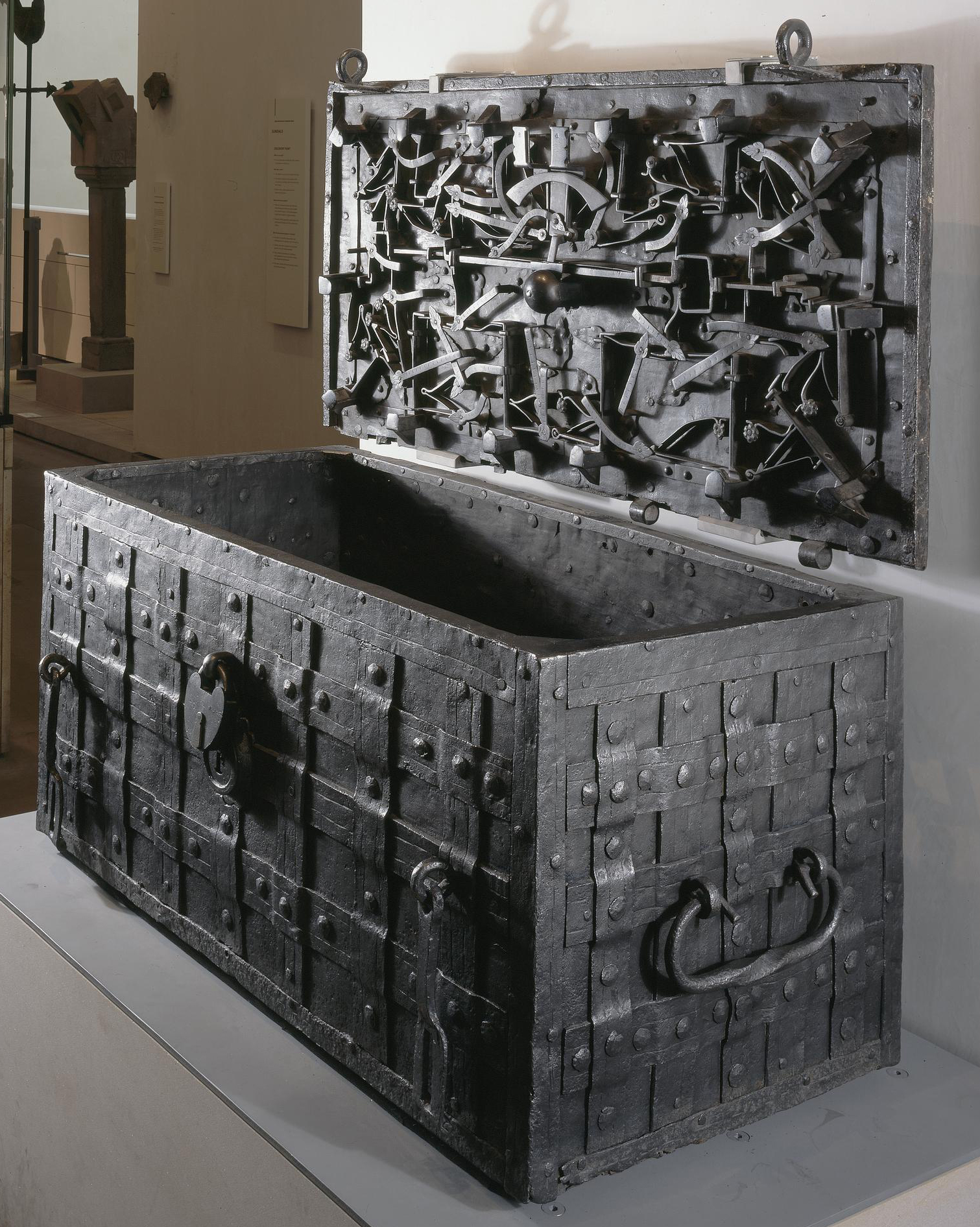
This chest was used to store money and documents associated with the Company of Scotland, a trading company set up in 1695 with the power to establish colonies.

In the face of opposition by English commercial interests, the Company of Scotland raised subscriptions in Amsterdam, Hamburg and London for the scheme. For his part, King William II of Scotland and III of England had given only lukewarm support to the whole Scottish colonial endeavour. (Note: On signalling his approval for the creation of the Company of Scotland, the King declared before Parliament: "I have been ill-served in Scotland, but I hope some remedies may be found to prevent the inconveniences which may arise from this Act.") England was at war with France and hence did not want to offend Spain, which claimed the territory as part of New Granada.

One reason for English opposition to the scheme was the prevalent economic theory of mercantilism, which tended to view markets as static and therefore often necessitated the seizure of market share by usurping it from others. This meant that the Darien scheme posed an active threat to English merchants rather than mere competition.

England was also under pressure from the London-based East India Company (EIC), which was keen to maintain its monopoly over English foreign trade and forced the English and Dutch investors to withdraw. The EIC then threatened legal action, claiming that the Scots had no authority from the king to raise funds outside of the English realm, and obliged the promoters to refund subscriptions to the Hamburg investors. This left no source of finance but Scotland itself. Returning to Edinburgh, the Company of Scotland for Trading to Africa raised £400,000 sterling in a few weeks (equivalent to roughly £60 million today), (Note: UK Consumer Price Index inflation figures from 1209–2024 based on data from "Inflation calculator". Bank of England. London. 18 February 2026.) with investments from every level of society, and totalling about one fifth of the wealth of Scotland, a massive amount of capital.

Scottish-born trader and financier William Paterson had long promoted a plan for a colony on the Isthmus of Panama. Essentially the intention was to tame, occupy and administer the land of the Darién Gap, later known to be virtually untraversable. The colony was to be situated on a gateway between the Atlantic and Pacific oceans permitting trade between them–the same principle that, much later, led to the construction of the Panama Railroad and the Panama Canal. Paterson was instrumental in launching the company in London. He had failed to interest several European countries in his project but, in the aftermath of the English reaction to the company, he secured a hearing for his ideas. The Duke of Hamilton, a major supporter of the scheme, planned to import slaves "to be worked to death" at local gold mines in the region after a Scottish colony had been established in Panama.

The Scots' original aim of emulating the East India Company by capitalising on the lucrative trading areas of the Indies and Africa was forgotten, and the highly ambitious Darien scheme was adopted by the company. Paterson later fell from grace when a subordinate embezzled funds from the company, reclaimed Paterson's stock and expelled him from the Court of Directors; he was to have little real influence on events after this point. Historian Stephen Mullen referred to the scheme as a "mercantilist venture designed to improve personal fortunes and Scotland's balance of trade through colonisation and exploitation".

== First expedition (1698) ==
Many former officers and soldiers, who had little hope of other employment, eagerly joined the Darien project. Many of them were acquainted from serving in the army and several–Thomas Drummond, for example–were notorious for their involvement in the Massacre of Glencoe. In some eyes they appeared to be a clique, and this was to cause much suspicion among other members of the expedition. The first council, appointed in July 1698, was intended to govern the colony until a parliament could be established and consisted of Major James Cunningham of Eickett, Daniel Mackay, James Montgomerie, William Vetch, Robert Jolly, Robert Pinkerton and Captain Robert Pennecuik (commodore of the expedition fleet).

The first expedition of five ships (Saint Andrew, Caledonia, Unicorn, Dolphin, and Endeavour) set sail from the east coast port of Leith to avoid observation by the Royal Navy in July 1698, (Note: Sources vary about the exact date of departure, placing it anywhere between 8 July and 26 July.) with about 1,200 people aboard. The journey around Scotland for those kept below deck was so traumatic that some colonists thought it comparable to the worst parts of the entire Darien experience. Their orders were "to proceed to the Bay of Darien, and make the Isle called the Golden Island ... some few leagues to the leeward of the mouth of the great River of Darien ... and there make a settlement on the mainland". The fleet called at Madeira and the West Indies, and took possession of Crab Isle, which would be taken by the Danish after the failure of the colony. Employing former pirate Robert Allison as a pilot, the fleet reached the coast of Darien on 2 November.

The settlers christened their new home Caledonia, declaring: "we do here settle and in the name of God establish ourselves; and in honour and for the memory of that most ancient and renowned name of our Mother Country, we do, and will from henceforward call this country by the name of Caledonia; and ourselves, successors, and associates, by the name of Caledonians". With Drummond in charge, they dug a ditch through the neck of land that divided one side of the harbour in Caledonia Bay from the ocean, and constructed Fort St Andrew, which was equipped with fifty cannons, but no source of fresh water. This ditch is the only identifiable remnant of Caledonia. A watchhouse on a mountain completed the fortifications. Although the harbour appeared to be a natural one, it later proved to have tides that could easily wreck a vessel trying to leave. The colony was a potential threat to the Spanish Empire because of its proximity to routes used for silver shipments. The feasibility of the scheme, especially for a country of Scotland's limited resources, has often been considered doubtful, although some modern authorities consider that it might have succeeded if it had been given the support of England.

Although chosen site was only 80 km from the Pacific Ocean, it lies in an area where overland transport would have been extremely difficult to impossible.

=== New Edinburgh ===
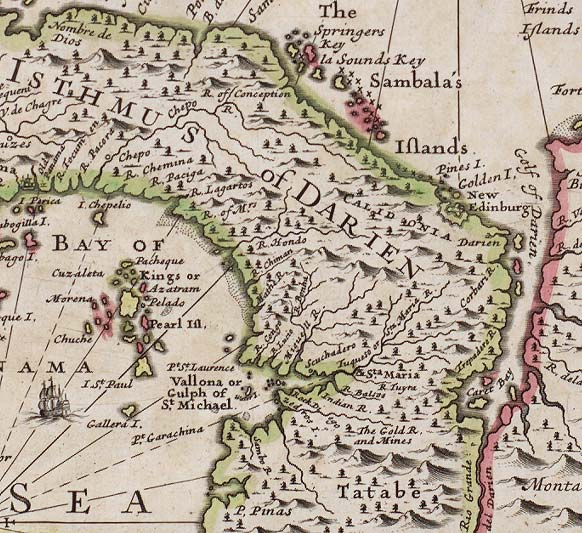
"A New Map of the Isthmus of Darien in America, The Bay of Panama, The Gulph of Vallona or St. Michael, with its Islands and Countries Adjacent". In A letter giving a description of the Isthmus of Darian, Edinburgh: 1699. The Scottish settlement of New Edinburgh can be seen on the coast above right.

Close to the fort, the settlers began erecting the huts of the main settlement, New Edinburgh (until 2011 known as Puerto Escocés, now Puerto Inabaginya, in Guna Yala Province, Panama), and clearing land to plant yams and maize. Letters sent home by the expedition created a misleading impression that events were unfolding according to plan. This seems to have been by agreement, as certain optimistic phrases were repeatedly stated in the messages. However, the delusion left the Scottish public completely unprepared for the coming failure.

Agriculture proved difficult and the natives, though hostile to Spain, were unwilling to trade for the combs and other trinkets offered by the colonists. Most serious was the nearly complete failure to sell any goods to the few passing traders who passed through the bay. With the onset of summer the following year, yellow fever and malaria caused many deaths. Eventually, the mortality rate rose to ten settlers per day. Natives brought gifts of fruit and plantains, but these were appropriated by the leaders and sailors, who mostly remained on board ships. The settlers did succeed in hunting for giant turtles, but fewer and fewer men were fit enough for such strenuous work. The situation was exacerbated by the lack of food, mainly the result of a high rate of spoilage caused by improper stowing. At the same time, King William instructed the Dutch and English colonies in America not to supply the Scots' settlement, fearing the wrath of the Spanish Empire. The only reward that the council could offer was alcohol, and drunkenness became common, even though it sped the deaths of men already weakened by dysentery, fever and the rotting, worm-infested food.

After just eight months, the colony was abandoned in July 1699, except for six men who were too weak to move. The deaths continued on the ships, and only 300 of the 1,200 settlers survived. A desperate ship from the colony sought refuge at the Jamaican city of Port Royal, but it was refused assistance on the orders of the English government, who feared antagonising the Spanish. Those on the single ship that returned home were generally regarded as a disgrace to their country, and many were disowned by their families. The Caledonia, with 250 survivors, including William Paterson and the Drummond brothers, made a desperate passage to New York, then just a small town of 5000, landing on 10 August. Four days later, Unicorn (commanded by Captain John Anderson) limped into New York harbour. In a letter to Hugh Montgomerie, a Glasgow merchant, Robert Drummond reported that sickness and mortality continued to afflict the remnant of the colonists. When the Scots were told that two ships, the Olive Branch and Hopeful Beginning, had already sailed to resupply the now deserted colony, Thomas Drummond commissioned two sloops to aid their efforts in Darien.

== Resupply (1699) ==
In August 1699, the Olive Branch and Hopeful Beginning with 300 settlers arrived in Darien to find ruined huts and 400 overgrown graves. Expecting a bustling town, the ship's captains debated their next move. When the Olive Branch was destroyed by an accidental fire, the survivors fled to Jamaica in the Hopeful Beginning and landed in Port Royal harbour. The Scots were not allowed ashore, and illness struck the crowded ship.

On 20 September, Drummond set sail from New York in the sloop Ann of Caledonia, (formerly the Anne), picking up another fully supplied vessel, Society, on the way. They arrived in Darien to find the burnt timbers of the Olive Branch rotting on the shore.

== Second expedition (1699) ==
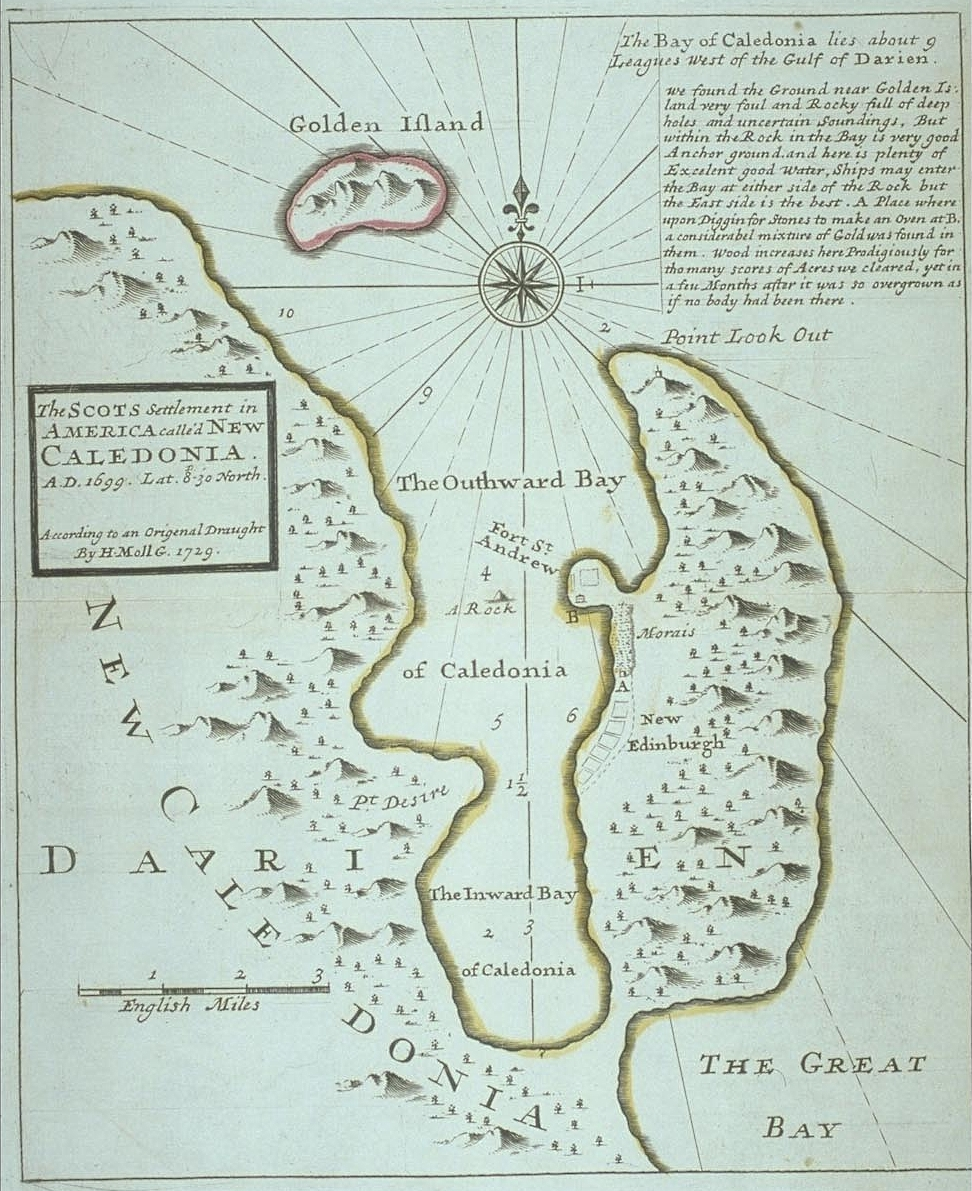
The Bay of Caledonia, west of the Gulf of Darién. New Edinburgh is on the isthmus on the right.

Word of the first expedition did not reach Scotland in time to prevent a second voyage of more than 1,000 people.

After the perilous route around the north of Scotland taken by the previous ships, Paterson wrote to the directors: "For God's sake, .. be sure to send the next fleet from the Clyde, for the passage north about is worse than the whole voyage to the Indies." A new company flagship, The Rising Sun, boasting 38 cannons, was supported by The Duke of Hamilton, the Hope of Bo'ness, and a smaller vessel, the Hope.

The expedition had the blessing of the Church of Scotland, which had appointed Alexander Shields as the senior of the four ministers (including Archibald Stobo and Francis Borland).

The second expedition arrived in Caledonia Bay on 30 November 1699 and found Drummond's New York sloops already there. Some men were sent ashore to rebuild the huts, which caused others to complain that they had come to join a settlement, not to build one.

Morale was low and little progress was made. Drummond insisted that there could be no discussion and that the fort must be rebuilt, as a Spanish attack was expected soon.

Drummond clashed with the merchant James Byres, who maintained that the leaders of the first expedition had now lost that status and had Drummond arrested. Initially bellicose, Byres began to expel all those whom he suspected of being offensively minded or allegiant to Drummond. He outraged a kirk minister by claiming that it would be unlawful to resist the Spanish by force of arms, as all war was contrary to Christian values. Byres then deserted the colony in a sloop.

The colonists sank into apathy until the arrival of Alexander Campbell of Fonab, sent by the company to organise a defence. He provided the resolute leadership that had been lacking and drove the Spanish from their stockade at Toubacanti in January 1700. However, Fonab was wounded in the daring frontal attack and became incapacitated with a fever.

The Spanish force, which were also suffering serious losses from fever, approached Fort St. Andrew and besieged it for a month. The Spanish commander Juan Pimienta called for the Scots to surrender and avoid a final assault, warning that if they did not, no quarter would be provided. Spanish records discovered in the 21st century suggested that they would have launched a stronger campaign against the Scots had the first one failed.

After negotiations, the Scots were allowed to leave with their guns, and the colony was abandoned for the last time. Only a handful of those from the second expedition returned to Scotland. Of the total 2,500 original settlers, only a few hundred survived.

== Reactions to the failure ==
The failure of the colonisation project provoked tremendous discontent throughout Lowland Scotland, where almost every family had been affected. Some held the English responsible, and others believed that they could and should assist in yet another effort at making the venture work. The company petitioned the king to affirm their right to the colony. However, he declined, saying that although he was sorry the company had incurred such huge losses, reclaiming Darien would mean war with Spain. The continuing futile debate on the issue served to further increase bitter feelings. An estimated 15–40% of all the actual capital in Scotland was invested in this project.

Hoping to recoup some of its capital by a more conventional venture, the company sent two ships from the Clyde, the Speedy Return and the Continent, to the Guinea coast laden with trade goods. Sea captain Robert Drummond was the master of the Speedy Return; his brother Thomas, who had played such a large part in the second expedition, was supercargo on the vessel. Instead of trying to sell for gold as the company's directors intended, however, the Drummond brothers had exchanged the goods for slaves (from the inter-African tribal slavery which supplied almost all slaves), whom they sold in Madagascar. Carousing with the buccaneers for whom the island was a refuge, the Drummonds fell in with pirate John Bowen, who offered them loot if they would lend him their ships for a raid on homeward bound Indiamen.

Drummond backed out of the agreement, only to have Bowen appropriate the ships while Drummond was ashore. Bowen burnt the Continent on the Malabar coast when he decided she was of no use to him, and he later scuttled the Speedy Return after transferring her crew to a merchant ship that he had taken. The Drummonds apparently decided against returning to Scotland, where they would have had to explain the loss of the ships they had been entrusted with, and no more was ever heard of them.

The company sent out another ship, but she was lost at sea. Unable to afford the cost of fitting out yet another vessel, the company hired the Annandale in London to trade in the Spice Islands. However, the East India Company had the ship seized on the grounds that it was in contravention of their charter. That provoked an uproar in Scotland, greatly aided by the inflammatory rhetoric of the company's secretary, Roderick MacKenzie, a relentless enemy of the English. Fury at the country's impotence led to the scapegoating and hanging of three innocent English sailors.

In July 1704, Thomas Green, the 25-year-old master of the Worcester, an English merchant ship, arrived at Leith. Mackenzie convinced himself that the ship was an East India Company ship that should be seized in reprisal for the Annandale. He succeeded in getting legal authority and Green, who had been given the command at 21, watched as his ship's cargo was impounded and the sails, guns and rudder were removed over the next three months.

In December, the crew was arrested for piracy. Although many in Scotland were delighted, it soon became clear to the directors of the Darien company that Mackenzie's charges were not supported by any proof, and it seemed the men would be released. However, Mackenzie suddenly claimed to have ascertained from the crew of the Worcester that Green had drunkenly boasted of taking the Speedy Return, killing the Drummonds and burning the ship. Green and two of his crew, John Madden and James Simpson, were sent for trial in Edinburgh. Mackenzie produced several witnesses including members of Green's crew; their statements contradicted one another and none of them could accurately describe the dates, locations, or descriptions of the supposed victims of the Worcester. The prosecution case, which was made in medieval Latin and legal Doric, was unintelligible to jury and accused alike. The defence advocates' objections were dismissed by court officials and they fled after the trial. Some jurors resisted bringing in a verdict of guilty, but the men were convicted and sentenced to death by hanging.

The Queen advised her 30 privy councillors in Edinburgh that the men should be pardoned, but the common people demanded for the sentence to be carried out. Nineteen councillors made excuses to stay away from the deliberations on a reprieve, fearing the wrath of a huge mob that had arrived in Edinburgh to demand the sailors be put to death. Even though they had affidavits from London by two of the crew of the Speedy Return, who testified that Green and his crew had no knowledge or involvement in the fate of the ship, the remaining councillors refused to pardon them.

Green, Madden and Simpson were subjected to derision and insults by the mob before they were hanged. Green had complete faith that as an innocent man, he would be reprieved, and he was still looking to the Edinburgh road for a messenger as the hangman placed the hood over his head. The remainder of Green's crew were quietly pardoned and released.

== Consequences of failure ==
The failure of the Darien colonisation project has been cited as one of the motivations for the 1707 Acts of Union. According to this argument, the Scottish establishment (landed aristocracy and mercantile elites) considered that their best chance of being part of a major power would be to share the benefits of England's international trade and the growth of the English overseas possessions and so its future would have to lie in unity with England. Furthermore, Scotland's nobles were almost bankrupted by the Darien fiasco.

Some Scottish nobility petitioned Westminster to wipe out the Scottish national debt and stabilise the currency. Although the first request was not met, the second was, and the Scottish shilling was given the fixed value of an English penny. Personal Scottish financial interests were also involved. Scottish commissioners had invested heavily in the Darien project and believed that they would receive compensation for their losses. The 1707 Acts of Union, Article 15, granted £398,085 10s sterling to Scotland to offset future liability towards the English national debt. That amount equates to about £100 million in 2020 money.

== In popular culture ==
=== Novels ===
- The Rising Sun by Douglas Galbraith (2000). Fictional account of the Darien failure, written in the style of a journal, from the perspective of a cargo-master on the Rising Sun.
- Siphonophore by Jaimie Batchan (2021). Begins as the account of a settler from the Darien venture who has been left behind when the surviving members of the colony return to Scotland.
- The Colony by Daniel J Pollock (2025). Fictional account of the Darien Venture, featuring a fictional protagonist who interacts with the factual characters and is at the heart of the preparations, voyage, settlement, explorations, tragedies and ultimate demise of the colony.

=== Stage plays ===
- Caledonia by Alistair Beaton (2010). A satire about the Royal Bank of Scotland and the Scottish colonial ambitions of the late 17th century.
- "Darien, a commonplace book of Murdo Macfarlane" by Richard Robb (2019). A musical about the Scottish attempt to settle the Darien gap imagined through the eyes of one settler Murdo Macfarlane. Presented by Bell Baxter high school.

=== Music ===
- "Dreams of Darien" by The Paul McKenna Band (2011). A Scottish folk song describing the events of the Darien Venture and the reaction in Scotland.
- The Darien Venture, a math-pop band from Glasgow, Scotland, who were active from 2008–2013.
- "Darien" by Stanley Accrington, Manchester-based folk singer/songwriter (1986) included on his CD Semi Final Second Leg.

=== Games ===
- Darien Apocalypse, a 2018 Euro-style boardgame from British producer Ragnar Brothers where players cooperatively or competitively strive to develop the Darien trading colony and either help or hinder each other as much as possible against the depredations the original settlers faced.

=== Installations ===
- Astro-Darien by Kode9 and Lawrence Lek. An audiovisual installation that takes inspiration from the Darien Scheme, space races, and simulation games. Displayed at Corsica Studios, London in 2021.

== See also ==
- Lionel Wafer
- Gregor MacGregor
- the Marquis de Rays
- Scottish colonization of the Americas
  - Darien, Georgia
  - Perth Amboy, New Jersey
  - Nova Scotia

== General and cited references ==
- Brocklehurst, Steven (20 August 2010). "The Banker who Led Scotland to Disaster". BBC News.
- Carroll, Rory (11 September 2007). "The Sorry Story of How Scotland Lost its 17th Century Empire". The Guardian.
- Hidalgo, Dennis R. (2001), "To Get Rich for Our Homeland: The Company of Scotland and the Colonization of the Darién", Colonial Latin American Historical Review, 10 (3), ISSN 1063-5769
- Insh, George Pratt, ed. (1924), Papers Relating to the Ships and Voyages of the Company of Scotland Trading to Africa and the Indies, 1696–1707, Edinburgh: Scottish History Society, Edinburgh University Press
- Little, Allan (17 May 2014). "The Caribbean colony that brought down Scotland". BBC News.
- Monaghan, Tom (2002). Renaissance, Reformation and the Age of Discovery, 1450–1700. Heinemann. ISBN 978-0-435-32090-4.
- Bulletin of the New York Public Library. New York Public Library. 1914. p. 487.
- Prebble, John (1968), The Darien Disaster, London: Secker and Warburg
  - republished as Prebble, John (2000), Darien: the Scottish Dream of Empire, Edinburgh: Birlinn, ISBN 1-84158-054-6
- Watt, Francis (1911). "Paterson, William" . In Chisholm, Hugh (ed.). Encyclopædia Britannica. Vol. 20 (11th ed.). Cambridge University Press. p. 911.
- "How Scottish Independence Vanished in the Jungles of Panama". The Week. 30 April 2007. Archived from the original on 22 January 2012.
