= George Dew =

- Born: c. 1666
- Died: 1703 (aged 36–37)
- Occupations: Pirate, privateer, and buccaneer
- Known for: Sailed alongside William Kidd and Thomas Tew
- Piratical career
- Commands: Amy

George Dew, George Hout or George d'Hout (Note: First name occasionally Georges, last name also D'Hout, Hout, Huff, Hutt, Dhout, Doo, Dhu, Dewes, et al.) (c. 1666–1703) was a pirate, privateer, and buccaneer. He once sailed alongside William Kidd and Thomas Tew, and his career took him from Newfoundland to the Caribbean and the coast of Africa.

== Biography ==
Starting as a sailor aboard slave ships bound for west Africa, Dew took part in buccaneer raids on Panama City in 1686. Alongside Francois Grogniet and Pierre Le Picard in 1687 he sacked the city of Guayaquil in Ecuador, leading the English contingent after their commander Townley had been killed off Panama. By 1691 he had been granted a privateering commission from Bermuda to attack French shipping, which he pursued up the eastern seaboard of the American colonies, as far north as Acadia. That year he and William Kidd sailed in concert, turning away a militia sloop in the Piscataqua River and menacing a nearby fort. As a privateer he sailed alongside Thomas Griffin, using their commission as pretense to loot non-French ships. Dew and Griffin were chased by Christopher Goffe (himself a former pirate turned pirate-hunter) in the Swan out of Boston on suspicion of piracy, but their fast sloops outraced Goffe: “they could sail two feet to his one.”

Back in Bermuda in 1693, he married and started a family but soon left to sail again. When Thomas Tew sailed for Africa in his sloop Amity to attack French slave ports in Gambia in 1693, Dew joined him aboard his own sloop Amy. Shortly after leaving port they were caught in a storm and separated. Tew then ignored his commission to attack the French and sailed instead for Madagascar, pioneering the Pirate Round route. Dew's Amy lost its mast and struggled to reach Saldanha Bay in southern Africa. There he was arrested by the Dutch and accused of piracy and his ship was impounded. Sent to Holland for trial, he was released for lack of evidence and filed suit against the Dutch in turn.

By 1695 he was back in the Caribbean aboard the brigantine Marigold attempting to sail from Barbados to Africa. With his ship again damaged by a storm, the crew refused Dew's request to sail on to Africa and he was forced to return to Barbados empty handed. He returned to his family in Bermuda and in 1699 built a home now known as the Old Rectory, which still stands. Unknown to Dew, the Dutch in Saldanha Bay still had his old ship Amy: it was stripped for parts by pirates that same year. Dew began a law practice on Bermuda and was elected to a seat in the General Assembly before his death in 1703. Local legend holds that the Old Rectory is haunted by Dew's ghost, who can occasionally be heard playing a harpsichord.

== See also ==
- Isthmus of Panama, which Dew and the buccaneers crossed in 1685–1686 to raid the Spanish in the Pacific.
