= John Eaton (pirate) =

English buccaneer and pirate

John Eaton (fl. 1682-1686) was an English buccaneer and pirate active off the coasts of Spanish Central and South America. He circumnavigated the world before returning to England.

== History ==
Originally a merchant captain, Eaton commanded the 80-man, 250 ton, 20-gun Nicholas out of London when he sailed for Danish St. Thomas in 1683. After a visit to Cape Verde and a raiding spree along the Brazilian coast (including time spent alongside pirate George Bond), Eaton rounded the Strait of Magellan in early 1684. It was there he met the Cygnet under Charles Swan, who tried to conduct legitimate trade with the Spanish before turning to piracy. Nicholas soon met with the Bachelor's Delight under John Cook (who soon died and was replaced by Edward Davis) and separated from Cygnet. Eaton and Davis sailed together for several months, attacking Spanish shipping off Peru and other settlements. They met at Cocos Island, La Plata, and Juan Fernandez before Davis sailed on alone.

Eaton elected to sail west across the Pacific, resupplying at Gorgona then leaving for the East Indies (via Guam), which he reached in early 1685. Some of his men - including chronicler Ambrose Cowley, who had transferred from Davis - deserted at Batavia, while others remained with Eaton to raid local shipping near Canton and Timor. They had captured so much treasure that when their sails were damaged, they fashioned new sails of Chinese silk.

One source claims Eaton died after Nicholas reached Madras, where his remaining crew divided: some went ashore while others continued to raid up and down the coast, and still others returned to England aboard Nicholas. Other sources say Eaton survived the trip through the Indian Ocean, eventually returning to London in 1686. Some of Eaton's crew who'd elected to continue their piracy in the Indian Ocean eventually took over an East India Company vessel named Good Hope and convinced its navigator Duncan Mackintosh to serve as their Captain.

== See also ==
- William Dampier - Another chronicler and navigator who sailed with Cook, Davis, and Swan.
