= George Bond (pirate) =

- Occupation: Pirate
- Years active: 1683-1684
- Known for: Acting in league with Adolph Esmit
- Piratical career
- Type: Pirate, Guarda costa
- Base of operations: Caribbean
- Commands: Summer Island

George Bond (fl. 1683–1684) was an English pirate active in the Caribbean. He was known for acting in league with the pirate-friendly Governor of St. Thomas, Adolph Esmit.

== History ==
Bond had been master of the ship Summer Island out of London. On arriving in St. Thomas he purchased a Dutch ship from Governor Esmit, renaming it Fortune’s Adventure. In 1683 aboard his new 100-man ship he seized the English merchant vessel Gideon; he presented it to Esmit, who protected the pirates, outfitted their ship, and rewarded each of them with an ounce of gold dust. After Bond brought him a Dutch prize in December, Esmit maintained it had been salvaged as a shipwreck in order to deter an English party from reclaiming it. The Dutch vessel was later recovered but had been emptied of its cargo by Esmit.

Governor William Stapleton sent the warship HMS Frances under Captain Carlile in August 1683 to bring in Bond, but by that October Bond was still at large: “There is now no pirate abroad but Bond with a small ship and one hundred men. He is expected at St. Thomas where Captain Carlisle is ready for him.” Carlile was unable to capture Bond, and a frustrated Stapleton minced no words when speaking of Esmit's support of Bond, Jean Hamlin, and other pirates: “My lords, there is no safe trading to or from these parts until that receptacle of thieves and sea-robbers be reduced or that Governor hanged who so openly protects them.” Bond also spent a brief time sailing alongside English buccaneer John Eaton.

Around June 1684 Bond captured the formerly French sloop Fox and again brought it to Esmit, who refused the pleas from a Jamaican representative to return it. Bond's ultimate fate is unknown, though he reportedly sailed as a Spanish guarda costa privateer for a time.

== See also ==
- John Bear (pirate), another English captain who sailed as a Spanish guarda costa privateer.
