= Mathurin Desmarestz =

17th-century French pirate

Mathurin Desmarestz (1653-1700, last name also Demarais) was a French pirate and buccaneer active in the Caribbean, the Pacific, and the Indian Ocean.

== History ==
Born Isaac Veyret (or Vereil) in 1653, son of Isaac Veyret and Esther Pennaud, Mathurin Desmaretz was first recorded as one of the leaders of a group of French flibustiers (buccaneers) in 1685. He joined with Edward Davis, Francois Grogniet, Pierre le Picard, and others hoping to intercept the Spanish treasure fleet off Panama. They engaged the fleet that May but were outgunned and outmaneuvered and left with little to show for their efforts. The combined group split up to raid separately, with most of the French contingent following Groginet.

In early 1688 he was quartermaster to Jean Charpin aboard a ship supplied by retired fellow buccaneer Laurens de Graaf. They joined forces with Jean-Baptiste du Casse in early 1689, raiding off Cape Verde before returning to the Caribbean to attack Dutch colonies at Surinam and Berbice. When war broke out against England they assaulted St. Christopher; while leading ground troops their ship was stolen by mutinous English crewmen, led by William Kidd and Robert Culliford. The buccaneers under du Casse broke up in September; Charpin had been replaced by Jean Fantin, who took a brigantine and some of the French troops. Desmarestz purchased a fluyt called La Machine with the help of Charles de Courbon, comte de Blénac (Governor of Martinique) and was elected Captain.

He captured a few small ships in late 1689, putting into Guadeloupe in early 1690 to repair and refit, where the impoverished locals were happy to trade for Desmarestz’ food and supplies. He returned to Martinique where he met pirate Étienne de Montauban, who left with him when they sailed in June. Blénac was asked to have Desmarestz’ buccaneers return to now-French St. Christopher to help defend it but refused to ask them. In August he captured a treasure-laden 24-gun Spanish frigate from Trinidad, keeping it for his own and renaming it Le Ballestrelle, and giving La Machine to Montauban. They harassed three East India ships before Blénac returned to France.

Desmarestz sailed again to Martinique in August 1691 to refit and obtain a new commission before sailing toward western Africa, hoping eventually to raid off the Red Sea. After capturing English and Dutch vessels on the way he stopped in the Azores to resupply, where local French officials interceded to protect him from angry Dutchmen and Englishmen. Desmarestz conducted raids off Gambia and Sierra Leone through summer 1692.

By late 1694 Desmarestz was in the Indian Ocean, putting into Rajapur with the rickety and leaking La Ballestrelle. He purchased a grab to use as a tender and repair ship, sailing to Mohéli in the Comoros Islands. He tried to return to Martinique in early 1696 but his ship foundered and was smashed just offshore. He tried to send the grab to Anjouan (modern Johanna) but Henry Every captured it. Every warned other English captains in the area about desperate armed Frenchmen on Mohéli who were looking for a ship to steal, but he eventually took 52 of them on board his own ship Fancy. Other members of Desmarestz’ crew were given to Mughal authorities when they became furious over Every's capture of the pilgrim treasure ship Gunsway. Still others were found by a French warship squadron, who refused to help them and burned the ship they’d been building to escape Mohéli. Ironically William Kidd picked up a few more later in 1697 off Anjouan when his own crew was decimated by sickness.

Finally in December 1696 Desmarestz struggled to Reunion Island with a barely-seaworthy vessel and a few sick men. French officials knew he was a pirate but took him in when they saw his pathetic condition. He settled there, marrying a local woman and starting a family in 1697, and is believed to have died by 1700.

== See also ==
- Jean Hamlin, another French buccaneer who sailed to the coast of Africa.
