= Peter Harris (buccaneer) =

Two related late 17th-century buccaneers and pirates

"The third and fourth, which were led by Captain Peter Harris, had two green Flags, his Company being divided into two several Divisions…."

Peter Harris was the name of two buccaneers, an uncle and his nephew, who were active (separately) in the late 17th century.

== Peter Harris (the elder) ==
Peter Harris (died May 1680) was an English buccaneer. As early as 1671 Harris was part of Henry Morgan's flotilla which sacked Panama. By 1677 he had received a privateering commission to legitimize his activities. After capturing a powerful 28-gun Dutch vessel in late 1679, he played a significant role in the Pacific Adventure, a privateering expedition led by Richard Sawkins and John Coxon. Harris served as one of the captains during this expedition, alongside Bartholomew Sharp and Edmund Cooke. HMS Success caught Sawkins and was on the hunt for Harris in early 1680 but ran ashore and was lost. On 25 April 1680, the buccaneers raided the mining town of Santa Maria, situated east of Panama City, Sharpe having mediated an argulent between Coxon and Harris. After plundering the town, they set it ablaze and traveled downstream to the Pacific using canoes.

By 3 May, the buccaneers arrived at the port on Perico island, off the coast of Panama City. There, they encountered a Spanish fighting force composed of several barques and other ships. Despite ultimately emerging victorious, the buccaneers suffered the loss of twenty men, including Captain Harris.

== Peter Harris (the younger) ==
There was another buccaneer named Peter Harris, who was a nephew of the elder Captain Harris. This second Peter Harris was active in the same region during the years 1684 to 1685. In July 1684 he led an alliance of pirates and natives to repeat his uncle's sack of Santa Maria. After a skirmish against Spanish ships he joined Charles Swan in August to attack Paita. He was later given command of one of William Knight's prize ships, participated in another attack on Panama, then joined Edward Davis. He may have crossed the Pacific but records of his activities stop there. Some witnesses reported him still sailing alongside Davis as late as mid-1686.

== See also ==
Basil Ringrose - another member of the Pacific Adventure who, like Wafer, afterwards wrote a book about their expedition
