= Francois Grogniet =

French pirate

- Died: April 1687
- Occupation: Buccaneer
- Years active: 1683-7
- Piratical career
- Base of operations: Pacific coast of Spanish Central America

Francois Groginet (Note: Also called Francis Gronet, Grognet, Grognier, or by the nickname "Chasse-Marée".) (died 1687) was a French buccaneer and pirate active against the Pacific coast of Spanish Central America.

== History ==
Grogniet began his career as a flibustier (French buccaneer) in 1683, sailing a 70-man, 6-gun ship named St. Joseph (or St. Francis) alongside fellow Frenchman L’Escayer. In March 1685 they and other Frenchmen joined forced with English buccaneers Francis Townley, Edward Davis, Charles Swan, and Peter Harris. With the addition of troops from Mathurin Desmarestz and Pierre le Picard the French contingent had grown so large that the English gave them the captured Spanish prize ship San Rosario (Sainte-Rose or Santa Rosa). In exchange Groginet gave Davis French commissions to sail against the Spanish.

That May they combined to attack the Spanish treasure fleet. The buccaneers had the advantage in number of ships and men but were heavily outgunned by the large Spanish galleons: only Davis’ and Swan's ships had cannon. When Groginet's unarmed 308-man ship kept its distance and held off engaging the Spanish, Davis called off the attack. The English blamed Groginet's reluctance for the plan's failure and the fleet split up.

The French under Grogniet raided up the coast into Nicaragua, looting towns along the way. At Remedios (or possibly Quibo) they were caught ashore when Spanish vessels appeared, who attacked and burned the French ships. Grogniet and his buccaneers marched overland and by 1686 were planning to head across the Isthmus of Darien when they were found and rescued by Townley, who had split his forces from Swan's.

Together they attacked Spanish settlements in Grenada in April before splitting up again in May. Grogniet met with an English force again in January 1687, and combined forces to sack Guayaquil. Grogniet was wounded in the attack; he was carried back to sea where he died in April. The following month Davis and his company learned of Grogniet's death, and heard that Townley had himself been killed the previous September in Panama. George Dew then took command of the Englishmen's forces while le Picard took the French filibustiers, planning to march back to the Caribbean and sail the West Indies instead.

== See also ==
- Henry Morgan, the buccaneer whose sack of Spanish Panama led others to follow his example.
- William Dampier, who documented much of the buccaneers' voyages and battles.
