= John Read (pirate) =

English buccaneer, privateer and pirate

John Read (Note: John Read should not be confused with pirate William Read, who was also active in the Madagascar area around 1701. There was also an unrelated pirate named John Read who died on Madagascar some time prior to 1698, known mainly because a letter from his wife has survived.) (fl. 1683-1688) was an English buccaneer, privateer, and pirate active from South America to the East Indies to the Indian Ocean.

== History ==
Along with navigator and chronicler William Dampier, Read was a crewman aboard John Cook's 1683 privateering expedition which captured a prize ship they renamed Bachelor's Delight. Cook took them around Cape Horn to raid Spain's Pacific territories, joining a flotilla of other buccaneers including Charles Swan's Cygnet. Cook died in 1684, replaced by Edward Davis; Read, Dampier, and others soon transferred to Cygnet. After some unproductive raids Swan headed west across the Pacific in early 1686, his lack of success causing the crew to grow unruly. After a stop at Guam they arrived at Mindanao in the Philippines in June 1686. The crew soon mutinied, ejecting Swan and electing Josiah Teat (Note: Teat had been serving as Swan’s First Mate, and later as Captain of a captured barque which Swan used a ship’s tender for Cygnet.) as Captain, who was himself soon replaced as Captain by Read, setting sail in early 1687.

Read sailed Cygnet through the East Indies with little treasure to show for the voyage. In early 1688 they landed on Australia. Dampier, tired of sailing with Read and his crew, asked to be put ashore in the Nicobar Islands in 1688. Read sailed to the Indian Ocean, capturing their first lucrative prize ship in the process. On India's southwestern Coromandel coast the crew broke up, with many of the crew leaving to serve on Mughal ships. Read then took Cygnet to Madagascar where more of his sailors joined other pirate crews; Read himself took his earnings and boarded a ship bound for New York to retire from pirate life. The remaining sailors under Teat sailed back to Coromandel “where Captain Teat and his own men went ashore to serve the Mogul,” though Cygnet itself was in poor condition and finally sank at Madagascar.

== See also ==
- Basil Ringrose - A chronicler like Dampier, he also sailed aboard Cygnet but was killed in a 1683 raid.
