= Bartholomew Sharp =

17th century English buccaneer

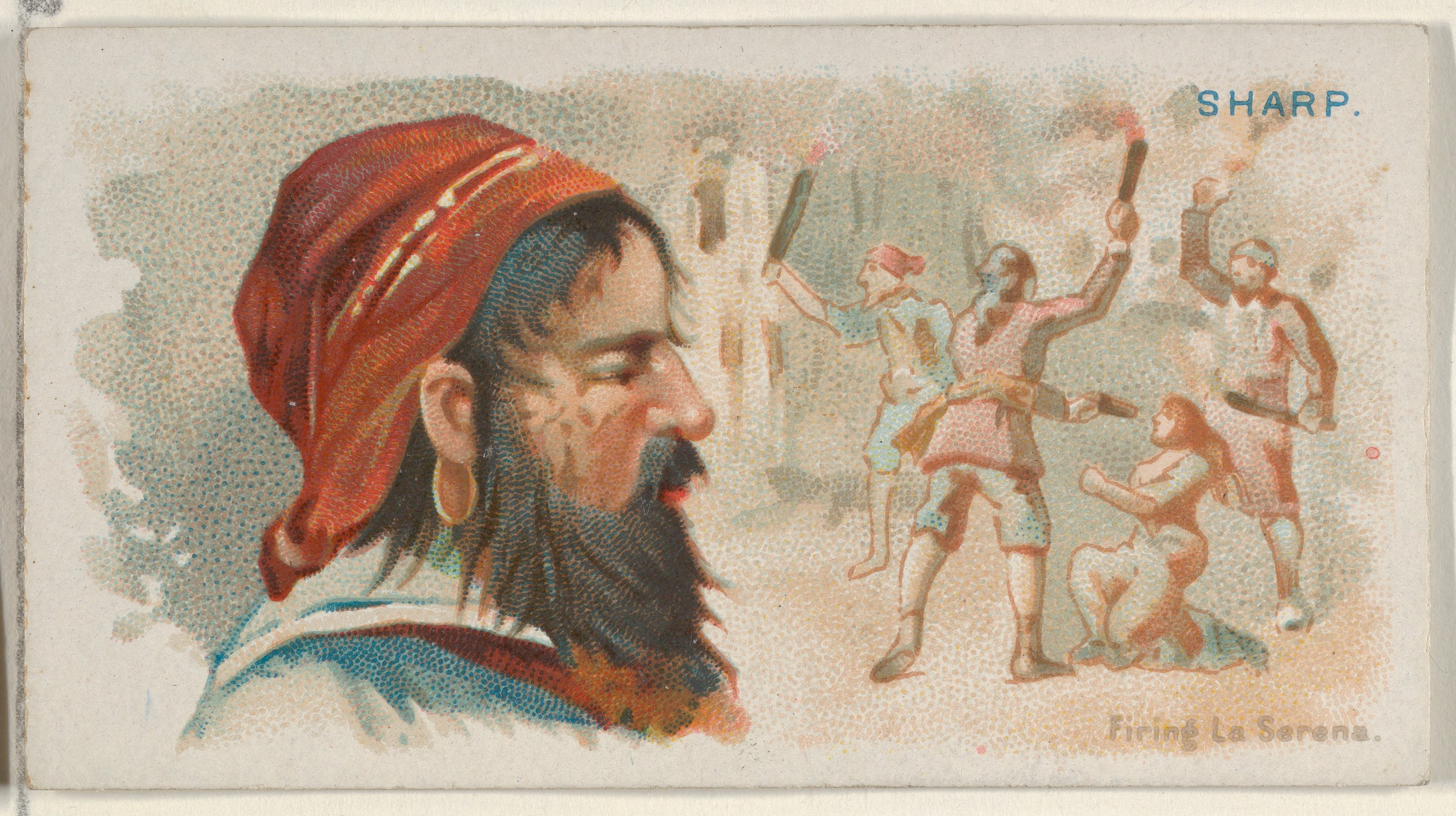
Bartholomew Sharp, Firing La Serena, from the Pirates of the Spanish Main series (N19) for Allen & Ginter Cigarettes MET DP835006

Bartholomew Sharp (c. 1650 – 29 October 1702) was an English buccaneer and privateer. His career of piracy lasted seven years (1675–1682). In the Caribbean he took several ships, and raided the Gulf of Honduras and Portobelo. He took command of an expedition into the Pacific and spent months raiding settlements on the Pacific Coast of South America including La Serena which he torched in 1680. His flagship, taken at Panama, was the Trinity.

== Early life ==
Bartholomew Sharp is believed to have been born in the parish of Stepney, London, England, around 1650. He served on a privateer vessel during the Third Anglo-Dutch War. He rose to command his own vessel in the West Indies and attacked Dutch ships in the Leeward Islands.

When the war ended and his commission expired, Bartholomew Sharp turned to piracy. The natural scientist and Buccaneer William Dampier suggested his first major raid was on the Central American town of Segovia. In 1679 a fleet of buccaneer vessels sailed for the Bay of Honduras, and on September 26 they took a Spanish merchantman. According to the governor of Jamaica, from the Calendar of State Papers:

"There has been lately taken from the Spaniards by Coxon, Bartholomew Sharpe, Bothing, and Hawkins with their crew, 500 chests of indigo, a great quantity of cacao, cochineal, tortoiseshell, money and plate. Much is brought into this country already, and the rest expected."

In December of that year the fleet reassembled at Port Morant, Jamaica. There Captains John Coxon, Robert Allison, Cornelius Essex, and Thomas Magott agreed to attack Portobelo on the Spanish Main and voted John Coxon their admiral. They were joined at sea by the French pirates Rose and Bournano. The fleet attacked Portobelo on January 17, 1680, and raided the city. Then the pirates moved to Bastimentos, (Note: Not to be confused with Bastimentos Island, Bocas del Toro, 270 km (170 mi) to the west.) 10 km (6.2 mi) to the northeast, with their booty and prisoners, to distribute the booty. They then blockaded the port for two weeks, taking several unsuspecting merchant ships.

== The Pacific Adventure ==
“Our several Companies that marched, were distinguished as followeth. First, Captain Bartholomew Sharp with his Company had a red Flag, with a bunch of white and green Ribbons….”

The fleet was joined by Captains Richard Sawkins, Edmund Cooke, and Peter Harris. Bournano and Rose chose to leave the voyage, and the remaining pirates voted to attack the city of Panama, once again under John Coxon. They sailed for Golden Island and left their ships in the hands of skeleton crews off the coast of Darién. Three hundred and fifty pirates went ashore to march across the Isthmus of Panama. They included William Dampier, Welsh surgeon and naturalist Lionel Wafer and ship's doctor Basil Ringrose. All three men would write accounts of their voyage to be published later in England. The pirates marched overland to meet with the 'Emperor of Darien' King Goldecap of the Kuna people. He agreed to send guides and warriors with the buccaneers, including his eldest son, if they agreed to rescue his daughter from the nearby Spanish garrison at Santa Maria. The pirates rowed downriver in canoes provided by the Kuna until they were outside the walls of Santa Maria. Fifty men charged the breastworks and breached the walls; after a mêlée within the fort, the Spanish surrendered. The pirates rescued the King's daughter, who was pregnant with her Spanish captor's child, and returned her to the King.

The Kuna guides led the pirates downriver to the Bay of San Miguel in the Gulf of Panama. They took two small barques and sailed for Panama. There they encountered three Spanish galleons on patrol supported by five large warships in the harbour at Perico. The pirates fought from canoes and took command of one of the barques commanded by Don Jacinto de Barahona. Another of the Spanish ships escaped while the third caught fire and her magazine exploded.

During the engagement the pirates reported losing only two men and another eleven injured. Captain Peter Harris was wounded in the fight and would die two days later. Captain Coxon took command of the captured vessel and the Spanish were taken prisoner. The five warships were empty, and the pirates soon commandeered three of those, sinking the other two. The largest of these, La Santísima Trinidad, was renamed The Trinity and given over to Captain Richard Sawkins. John Coxon was relieved of command for cowardice, and he left with 75 men to return to the Caribbean. The men voted Sawkins their new admiral. The pirates left Panama for a nearby fishing village to await a ransom for the captured soldiers and to try to capture Spanish ships unaware of their presence. They captured a galleon carrying 60,000 pieces of eight intended for the pay of Panama's soldiers. The governor of Panama refused their ransom and inquired after who gave the buccaneers a commission to attack Spanish cities in a time of peace. Admiral Sawkins replied:

"As yet all his company were not come together; but that when they were come up we would come and visit him at Panama, and bring our commissions on the muzzles of our guns, at which time he should read them as plain as the flame of gunpowder could make them."

Less than a week later Richard Sawkins would be killed in battle outside Puebla Nueva and 75 of his men would leave the expedition. Command fell to Bartholomew Sharp.

Under Admiral Sharp the fleet sailed south along the coast of South America. They failed to take many prizes, however. Word of their presence had spread, and Spanish settlements were all prepared for them. After weeks at sea the pirates finally captured a Spanish galleon out patrolling for the English. Sharp tortured their prisoners and killed a Spanish friar on deck in front of all the men. Many among the crew began to question his fitness for command. After a series of disappointments, the crews finally voted to remove Bartholomew Sharp from command in January 1681. They installed John Watling as captain. Watling led an attack on the rich city of Arica only to be repelled and killed. Reluctantly the men reinstated Bartholomew Sharp to command. Sharp suspected former captain and fellow buccaneer Edmund Cooke of involvement in his ouster and had him imprisoned, ostensibly over charges of buggery.

Shortly thereafter fifty more men left the voyage, including William Dampier and Lionel Wafer.

The buccaneers continued around South America and up to the Caribbean, taking 25 Spanish ships and plundering numerous Spanish towns. Captain Sharp is credited as being the first Englishman ever to travel eastwards around Cape Horn. Sharp had planned to return to England via the Strait of Magellan, but a storm pushed the Trinity too far south, forcing him to navigate the Cape.

An eyewitness account of Sharp's adventures was published in The Dangerous Voyage And Bold Assaults of Captain Bartholomew Sharp and Others, by Basil Ringrose (London, 1684).

William Dampier gave a brief account of his time with Captain Sharp and the buccaneers in A New Voyage Round the World (1697).

Lionel Wafer also gives an account of his departure from the voyage in A New Voyage and Description of the Isthmus of America (1695).

John Cox (not to be confused with John Coxon) wrote an account of his time with the buccaneers, and Bartholomew Sharp wrote his own account, and a detailed atlas intended for the Admiralty.

== Pardon ==
Because England and Spain were not at war, the Spanish demanded Sharp's prosecution for piracy. Sharp was arrested and brought before the High Court of Admiralty. However, he presented the authorities with a book of maps taken from the Spanish ship El Santo Rosario ("Holy Rosary") in July 1681. Translated by Sharp's sailor Philip Dassigny, their value to English seafarers was such that Sharp received a full pardon from Charles II. They were later redrawn by William Hack for several private editions c. 1684 known as South Sea Waggoners or Wagoner of the Great South Sea.

== Prison and death ==
In 1696, Sharp established himself on the island of St. Thomas in the Danish West Indies. By 1700, due to his debt, he tried to flee the island and the Danish colonial authorities. The attempt failed, and Sharp was confined to prison, where he died on 29 October 1702.

== See also ==
- William Dampier
- Lionel Wafer
- Chepo expedition
- Henry Morgan
