= Raveneau de Lussan =

French buccaneer (born 1663)

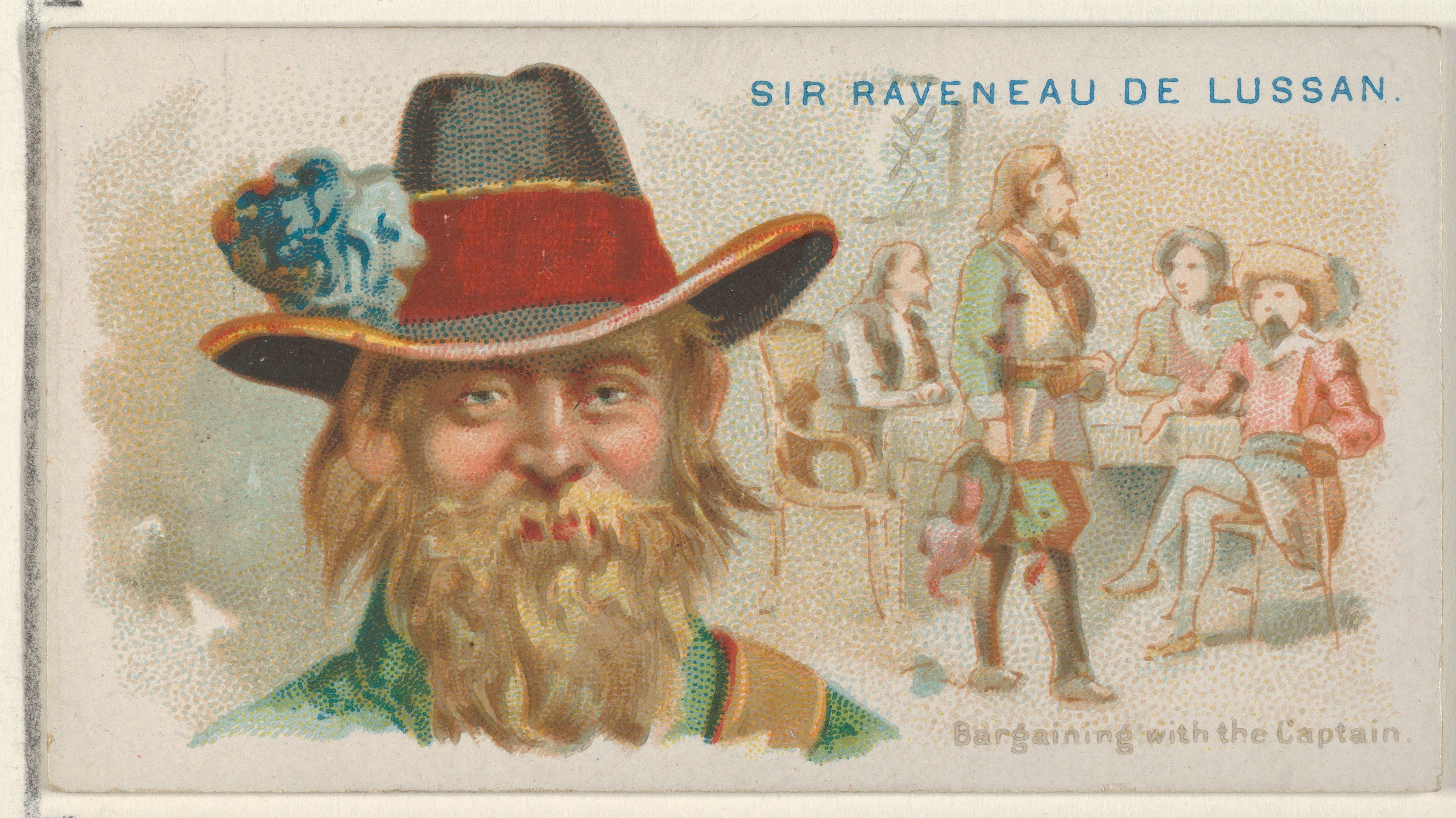
Sir Raveneau de Lussan, Bargaining with the Captain, from the Pirates of the Spanish Main series (N19) for Allen & Ginter Cigarettes MET DP835045

Raveneau de Lussan (born c. 1663 in Paris) was a French buccaneer.

He belonged to a noble but impoverished family, and embraced a military career at the age of 14. In 1679 he embarked for Santo Domingo in search of fortune, but was unsuccessful, and joined the buccaneers under Laurens de Graaf, sailing from Petit-Goâve, 22 November 1684. He soon left de Graaf at the head of a band of his own, and in 1685 pillaged the town of El Realejo. In 1686 his band took part in the capture of Grenada, and, not finding the booty they expected, set fire to the city. After this Lussan separated from the English pirates, but he joined them again for the purpose of attacking Guayaquil, which they took with much booty.

Lussan and a part of his followers then sailed for Tehuantepec, which they captured, and went as far north as Acapulco. They returned to Mapala, a port north of El Realejo, and deliberated on the route they should take to reach the Antilles. It was agreed to march to Nueva Segovia, a town situated on the Coco River, which empties into the Atlantic. Of this expedition Voltaire said: "The retreat of the ten thousand will always be more celebrated, but is not to be compared to it." Lussan formed four companies, of seventy men each, and made them swear to observe the severest discipline. On 2 January 1688, after praying together, and sinking their boats for fear they might fall into the power of the Spaniards, they began their march, and in ten days, during which they were almost constantly engaged in fighting superior numbers, they reached Nueva Segovia. One evening, in a defile surrounded by rocks of great height on which the Spaniards had intrenched themselves, the buccaneers sought hopelessly for a way of escape. Lussan proposed that, leaving eighty men to guard the sick, they should get in the rear of the mountains and then surprise the enemy. His advice was at first rejected, but was adopted when their case became desperate. They found a path which led behind the mountains, and, favored by a thick fog, they forced the intrenchments of the Spaniards and put them to flight.

After this victory they chanted a Te Deum. They then descended the Yara on the wretched boats of the country, and came in sight of Cape Gracias a Dios on 9 February. Lussan embarked on an English lugger on 14 February, and reached Santo Domingo on 6 April. He had marched nearly 1,000 miles, constantly harassed by the Spaniards, although the distance from the point where he started to that which he wished to reach was but 240 miles in a straight line.

Lussan published Journal du voyage fait à la mer du Sud avec les flibustiers de l'Amérique (Paris, 1688, 1690, 1705). It was dedicated to the minister of the navy, who, in common with most Frenchmen of the time, appeared to consider the exploits of Lussan worthy of approval. Although the work is confused, it contains curious and interesting details on the productions and manners of the natives of the countries he visited.
