= John Watling =

English buccaneer

John, or George, Watling (died 1681) was a 17th-century English buccaneer. It was said that he would never plunder on the Sabbath and refused to allow his crew to play cards on this holy day.

John Watling is best known for making his headquarters on the island currently dubbed San Salvador and naming it Watling Island. It is believed to be the island Guanahani, as named by the indigenous Lucayan people, which Christopher Columbus first saw in 1492 and renamed San Salvador. This is disputed by some. In 1925, the Bahamas officially named the island San Salvador after several scholars had argued that its features best matched Columbus' description of the island he visited.

== Mutiny and taking charge ==
In 1680–1681 John Watling sailed under Captain Bartholomew Sharp aboard the Most Holy Trinity. Certain members of the crew were unhappy with Sharp. Each buccaneer had amassed a fortune under Sharp's leadership, but many had gambled all of their money away. Sharp had not gambled and wanted to retire with his fortune. On 6 January 1681 at Juan Fernandez, the crew mutinied and deposed Sharp, electing Watling as his successor. On 12 January, three armed Spanish vessels approached Juan Fernandez, and Watling and his crew fled the port. They left behind a Mosquito Indian named Will, whom they were unable to find before departure. The buccaneers waited just out to sea, but the Spanish did not leave and so Watling slipped away on the night of 13 January.

== Arica ==
Several days later, the buccaneers decided to attack the rich Spanish settlement of Arica, Viceroyalty of Peru. They had attacked Arica previously but had not found any of the rumoured riches. A captured Indian warned Watling that Arica was heavily fortified, but Watling thought he was trying to trick them and shot him.

As it was four or five days' walk from the coast to Arica, and the 92 buccaneers had to carry their own water, they were exhausted when reaching the town. They tried to approach the settlement secretly, but were seen by the Spanish, who prepared their defense. On January 30 Watling split his men into two groups, one to attack the fort with hand grenades and the rest to attack the town. Upon seeing how heavily outnumbered the men were in the town, Watling soon sent all his forces there. The buccaneers repeatedly forced the Spanish to retreat, but, as they were outnumbered, the Spanish quickly retook territory they left. Finally the buccaneers conquered the town, and Watling turned back to the fort. The Spanish regained the settlement and surrounded Watling's men. Completely overwhelmed, the buccaneers fled, losing several men, including Captain Watling, shot during the retreat.

== Legacy ==
Watling is the namesake of John Watling's Distillery, a rum distillery in Nassau.

== See also ==
- History of the Bahamas
- Piracy in the Caribbean
