= Pierre le Picard =

French buccaneer

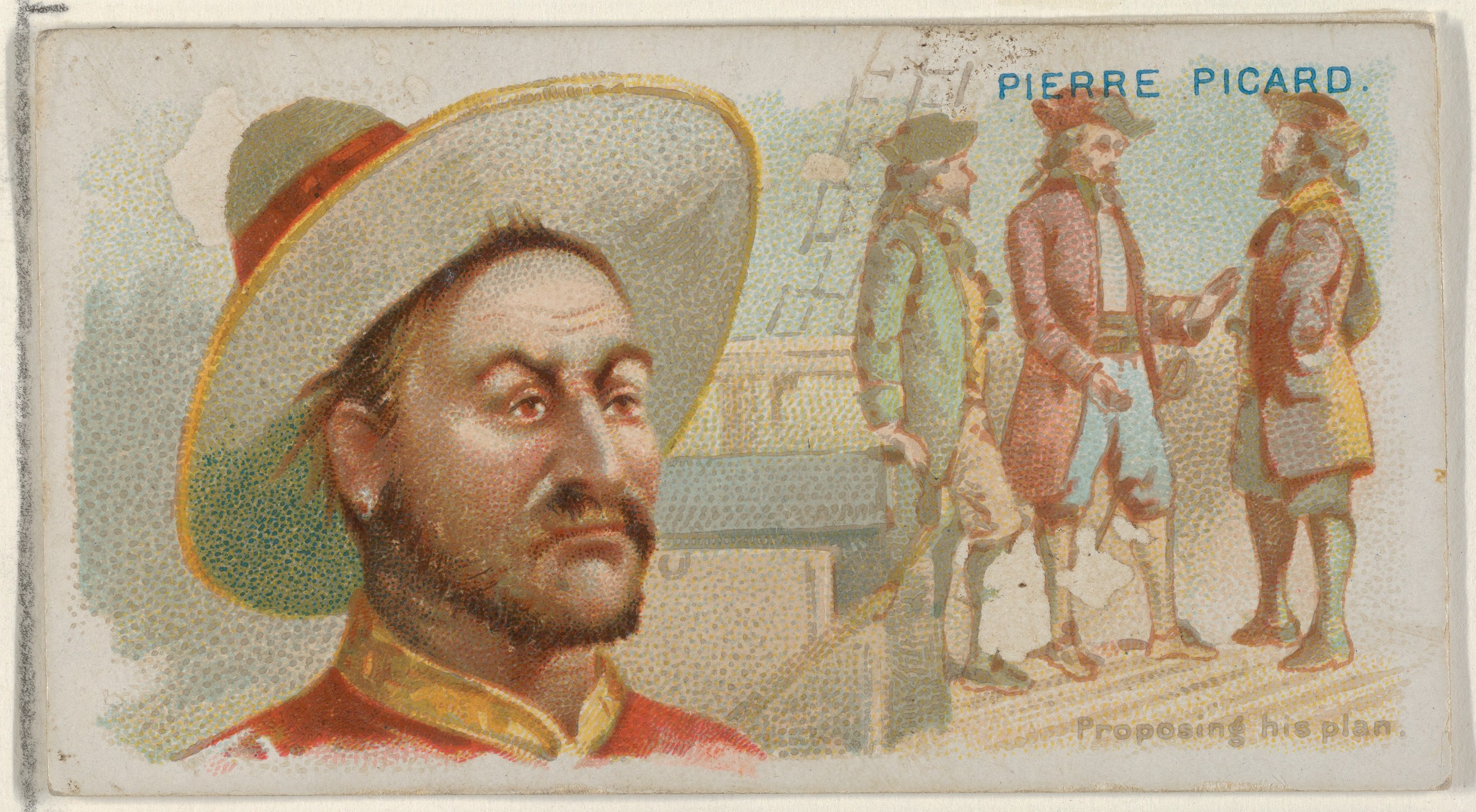
- Born: c. 1624; France
- Died: 1690?
- Piratical career
- Type: Buccaneer
- Allegiance: France
- Years active: 1666-1679; 1682-1689?
- Rank: Captain
- Base of operations: Tortuga

Pierre le Picard (c. 1624–1690?) was a 17th-century French buccaneer. He was both an officer to l'Olonnais as well as Sir Henry Morgan, most notably taking part in his raids at Maracaibo and Panama, and may have been one of the first buccaneers to raid shipping on both the Caribbean and Pacific coasts.

== Biography ==
Pierre le Picard is first referred to as an officer with l'Olonnais in his buccaneering expedition from Tortuga. Leaving with the fleet, he commanded a brigantine with 40 men and was present at the later raids against Maracaibo and Gibraltar in 1666 and Puerto Cabello and San Pedro in 1667. The fleet then stopped to regroup sometime after this point, capturing a Spanish ship off the coast of the Yucatán, before l'Olonnais called a council of his officers. Although proposing to sail to Guatemala, he and Moise Vauquelin opposed l'Olonnais' plan and, it is alleged, they encouraged the rest of the officers to leave their commander. The fleet did disband after this meeting, with Picard and Vauquelin leaving together to raid the coast of Costa Rica. The two successfully occupied and looted Veraguas that same year, however they parted ways after failing to capture the nearby town of Nata. This attack was included in Alexander Esquemeling's The Buccaneers of America years later.

In 1669, he returned to Maracaibo once more as a guide for Sir Henry Morgan's expedition and, two years later, joined him at Panama in command of the 10-gun Saint-Pierre. Although his activities are unknown during the next few years, at least one published source reporting his death in 1679, he is mentioned by then acting Governor of Jamaica Sir Henry Morgan as being active against English and Spanish shipping near Port Royal in 1682.

He may have also been the Captain le Picard who, in early 1685, sailed with the French buccaneering expedition including Francois Grogniet, Mathurin Desmarestz, George Dew, and a Captain Townley that crossed the Isthmus of Panama to raid unprotected Spanish settlements in the South Seas. They later joined with English buccaneers Edward Davis, Charles Swan and Peter Harris, although Picard apparently did not get along with their English partners. He returned to the Caribbean after the raid on Guayaquil in May 1687 and, while en route to Hispaniola, looted the city of Segovia before eventually retired to Acadie in southeastern Canada. During King William's War, he may have also commanded a small squadron during King William's War and attacked the English colony at Rhode Island in 1690 although was forced to withdraw due to heavy casualties.
