= Richard Sawkins =

English pirate

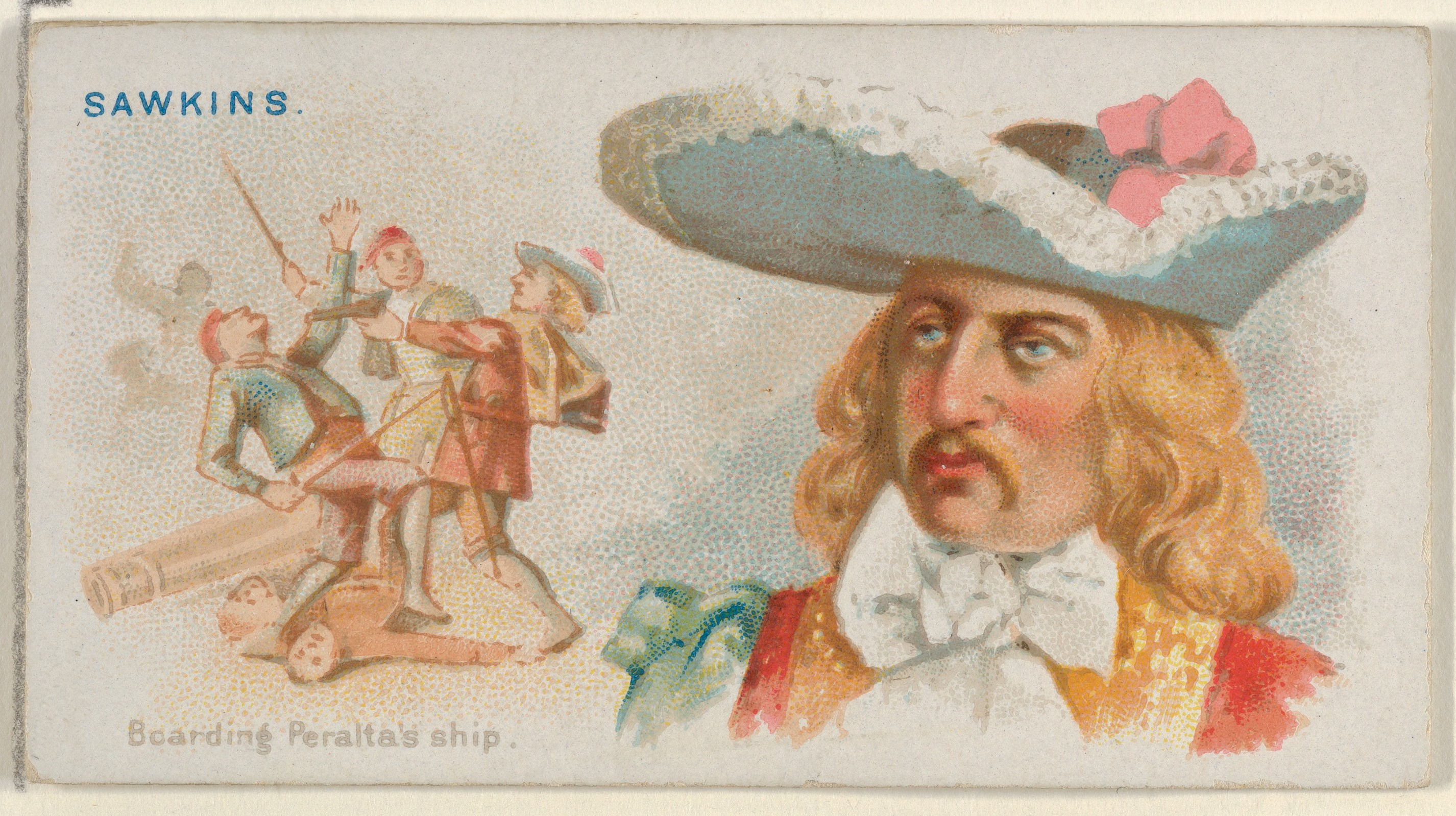
Sawkins, Boarding Peralta's Ship, from the Pirates of the Spanish Main series (N19) for Allen & Ginter Cigarettes MET DP835017

“The second Division led by Captain Richard Sawkins, with his men had a red Flag striped with yellow….”

Richard Sawkins or Hawkins (died May 22, 1680) was an English buccaneer who participated in the Pacific Adventure, a privateering expedition headed by Captain John Coxon.

Although little is known of his early life, Sawkins was captured by HMS Success and later imprisoned in Port Royal while awaiting trial for piracy as late as December 1, 1679. He was apparently released however as he is later recorded commanding a small 16-ton vessel with a crew of 35 men and one gun. Along with Peter Harris, he joined up with Captain John Coxon's privateering expedition near Bocca del Toro in late-March and was one of 330 buccaneers who landed on the coast of Darien with Coxon and Bartholomew Sharp. Marching overland through the jungle, Sawkins participated in a surprise attack and looting of Santa Maria, later crossing the isthmus in Indian canoes, and sailing down the Santa Maria River eventually making their way to the Pacific Ocean.

Arriving with his own group soon after, flying a red flag with yellow stripes, Sawkins soon captured two small Spanish vessels before sailing with his group towards Panama City. As they neared the city, Sawkins encountered a Spanish fleet of eight ships and, after a fierce battle, Sawkins was celebrated by his crew for his bravery and skill in their victory in what was later known as the Battle of Perico.

However, some of the party began arguing amongst themselves, and John Coxon eventually left the expedition with his seventy men and returned across the isthmus on foot. With the departure of Coxon, the remaining privateers elected Sawkins as head of the expedition while Sharp was out on a separate voyage.

After his victory over the Spanish fleet, Sawkins sailed towards Panama City and blockaded the harbor. Forced to negotiate with Sawkins, the Governor of Panama demanded to know Sawkins' intentions. Sawkins responded by demanding five hundred pieces of eight for each of the crew, and a further one thousand for each of his officers. In addition to this, Sawkins also demanded an end to the harassment and exploitation of the local native tribes. He later learned that the Bishop of Santa Martha, who had been Sawkins' prisoners five years earlier, was present in the city and sent him a present of two loaves of sugar. Although he received a gold ring from the Bishop, he received no response from the governor, and the crew, soon growing restless, eventually persuaded Sawkins to abandon his blockade and continued sailing south along the coast.

Landing with a party of sixty men, Sawkins led an attack against the town of Puebla Nueva on May 22, 1680. However, having prior knowledge of the privateers' presence in the area, three well-fortified breastworks had been constructed by the time of his arrival. Despite having lost the element of surprise, Sawkins continued his attack on the town and was killed by a musket-ball while at the head of his men.
