= Basil Ringrose =

English buccaneer (late 17th century)

Basil Ringrose (about 1653–1686) was an English buccaneer, navigator, geographer, and author.

== Early life ==
Ringrose was christened at St Martin-in-the-Fields on Jan 28 1653 by his father, Richard, and mother, Mary.

In 1677 he and his wife, Goodith, had a son, Jonathan.

== First voyage ==
Ringrose crossed the Isthmus of Darien in 1680 with a group of pirates. On this trip, he created extensive charts of the islands, soundings, exhaustive nautical instructions, and symbols to mark rocks and shallow water. Fluent in Latin and French, he quickly learned Spanish to act as an interpreter.

Captain Bartholomew Sharp, Lionel Wafer, John Coxon, Edmund Cooke, William Dick, and William Dampier were also crew members. Dampier refers to Ringrose as an apprentice to a planter in Jamaica. At the end of the voyage, Ringrose and several crewmates took the maps and charts to Dartmouth to sell.

== Second voyage ==
In October 1683 Ringrose sailed on the Cygnet with Captain Charles Swan, as the Supercargo. Damper writes "He had no mind for this voyage, but was necessitated to engage in it or starve." On the Mexican coast in Santa Pecaque, the crew looted the village. Capt. Swan sent 54 men with laden horses back to the anchorage, Ringrose among them. They were set upon by Spanish soldiers and massacred.

Ringrose's journal gives an account of the early part of this trip. It is now in the National Maritime Museum in Greenwich in England. His maps and charts have become "A Buccaneer’s Atlas" by William Hach, a noted cartographer in London of the time.
