= Charles Swan (pirate) =

Charles Swan (died 1690) was a reluctant buccaneer. Captain Swan was forced into piracy by his crew in the 1680s, and proceeded to write letters to the owners of his ship Cygnet in London, begging them to intercede with James II of England for his pardon—even as he looted his way up and down the coastal areas of South America.

He was present at the attack on Payta in 1684 alongside John Eaton, where he burned the town after no booty was found. On 25 August 1685, he separated from his confederates Peter Harris and Edward Davis, and sailed up the coast of Mexico alongside Francis Townley, but met with little success. He seized the town of Santa Pecaque but lost 50 men, including Basil Ringrose, to a Spanish counterattack.

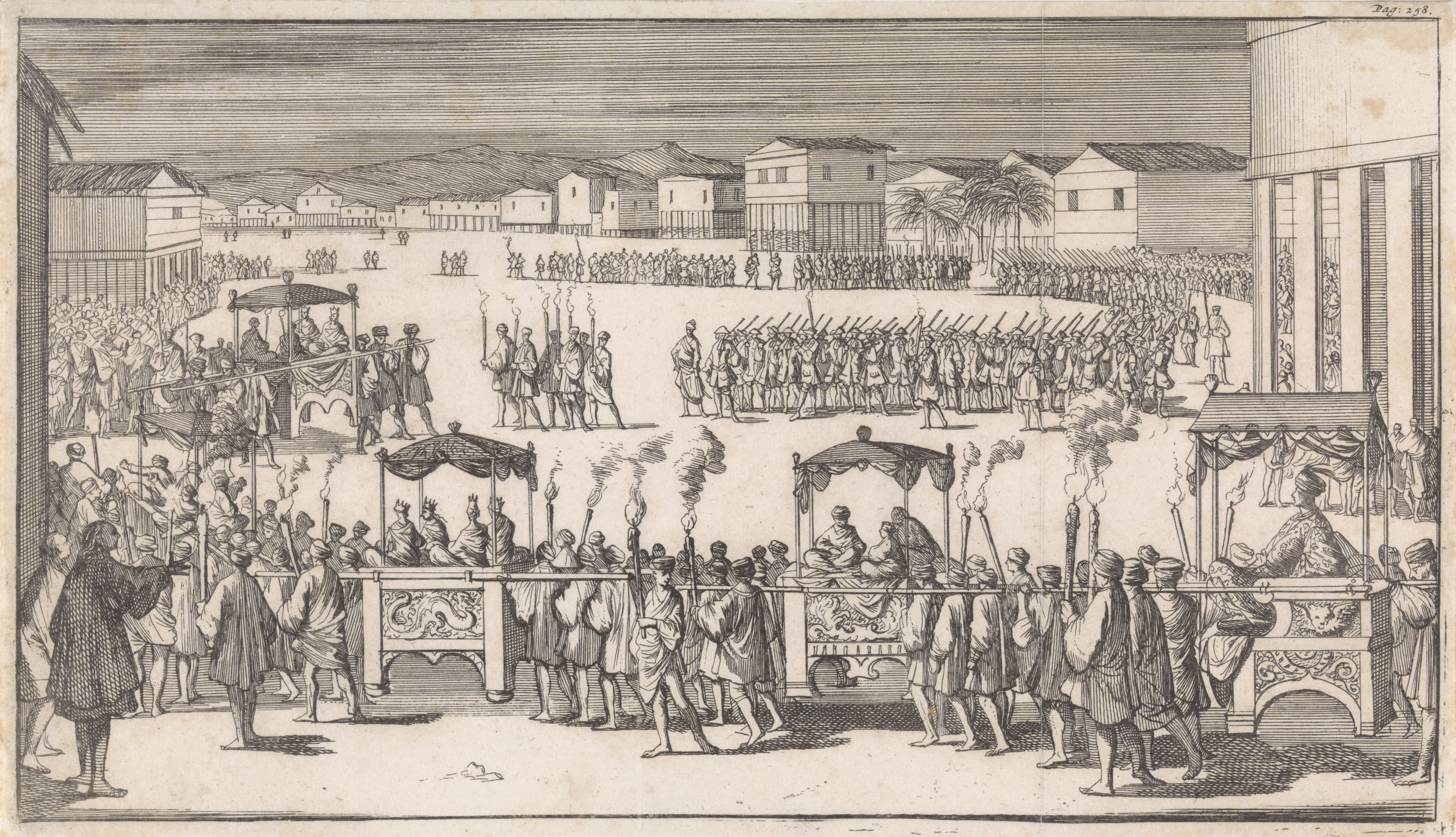
The grand procession to celebrate Captain Charles Swan's arrival in Mindanao

On 31 March 1686 he set out across the Pacific to ambush the Manila treasure galleon, but failed to overtake the ship. Due to the failure of the assault on Santa Pecaque provisions were short, and by the time they reached the East Indies the crew were plotting to eat their officers of the Cygnet as it crossed the Pacific (starting with the Captain). (Swan is reported to have remarked that the lean William Dampier would have made them a poor meal; the captain himself was a remarkably fat man.) They arrived at Guam without having to resort to cannibalism, and made their way on to the Sultanate of Mindanao. Swan's arrogance and the unruliness of his men soon spoiled their good relations with the local ruler, Raja Laut; and when the captain decided to abandon the attempt on the galleon, his men mutinied. He was replaced as Captain by John Read, who had originally been a crewman under Edward Davis (and Davis' predecessor, John Cook).

He managed to save £5,000 (legally the property of the Cygnet's owners) from the mutineers, and remained in Mindanao, becoming an officer in Laut's army. In 1690 he attempted to escape back to England on a Dutch ship with the money, but was chased by Laut's warriors who capsized his boat and speared him in the water.

== See also ==
- William Dampier
