= El Realejo =

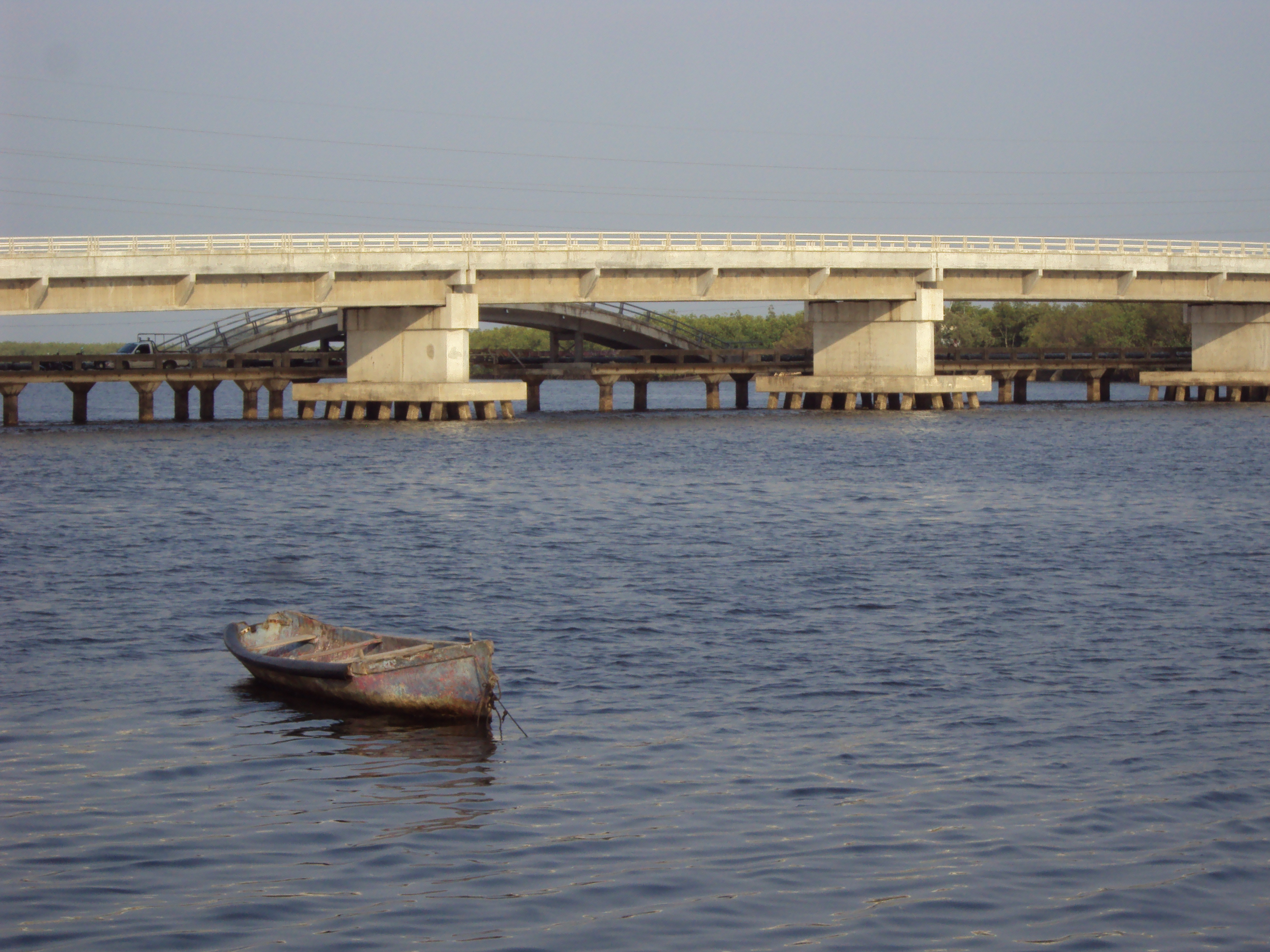

- Location in Nicaragua
- Coordinates: 12°32′N 87°10′W
- Country: Nicaragua
- Department: Chinandega
- Municipality: El Realejo
- Founded: 1532

Government
  - Mayor: Bertha Lorena Jarquin

Population (2005)
  - City: 8,838
  - Urban: 3,954
- Time zone: UTCGMT-6

El Realejo is a municipality in the Chinandega department of Nicaragua.

== History ==
The town of El Realejo was constructed in 1532, during the first years of Spanish colonization. During this period it served as Nicaragua's principal port, and remained so until the beginning of the 17th century, when pirate attacks started to threaten the town's commercial life-line. The importance of El Realejo was further diminished by the construction of Corinto, which came to be Nicaragua's new principal port.

In 1845 a shipment of weapons for the government in León was seized by the invading forces of Francisco Malespín during the Guerra de Malespín.

== Economy ==
Today, the economy is based on agriculture, fishing, and the raising of animals. El Realejo is characterized by open expanses of tropical savannah that give way to mountains and beaches.
