= Lionel Wafer =

Welsh privateer

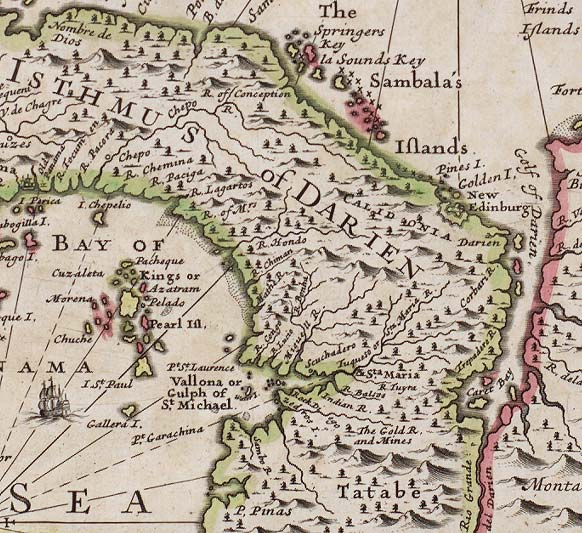
Map of the Darien Scheme, drawn in part with information from Lionel Wafer.

Lionel Wafer (c. 1640–1705) was a Welsh explorer, buccaneer and privateer.

A ship's surgeon, Wafer made several voyages to the South Seas and visited Maritime Southeast Asia in 1676. In 1679 he sailed again as a surgeon, soon after settling in Jamaica to practise his profession.

In 1680, Wafer was recruited by buccaneer Edmund Cooke to join a privateering venture under the leadership of Captain Bartholomew Sharp, where he met William Dampier at Cartagena.

After being injured by a flash-ignition of gunpowder during an overland journey, Wafer was left behind with four others in the Isthmus of Darien in Panama, where he stayed with the Guna people. He gathered information about their culture, including their shamanism and a short vocabulary of their language. He studied the natural history of the isthmus. The following year, Wafer left the Guna promising to return and marry the chief's sister and bring back dogs from England. He fooled the buccaneers at first as he was dressed as a Guna, wearing body-paint and ornamented with a nose-ring. It took them some time to recognise him.

Wafer reunited with Dampier, and after privateering with him on the Spanish Main until 1688, he settled in Philadelphia.

By 1690 Wafer was back in England and in 1695 he published A New Voyage and Description of the Isthmus of America, which described his adventures. It was translated into French (1706), German (1759), Swedish (1789), and Spanish (1899) by the Vicente Resptrepo (aresident of New Granada) as "Viajes de Lionel Wafer al Istmo del Darién. (Cuatro meses entre los Indios)".

The Company of Scotland Trading to Africa and the Indies hired him as an adviser when it was planning its settlement on the isthmus in 1698, and passages from his account of Darien informed the company's promotional literature.

He died in London in 1705.
