= 1680s in piracy =

This timeline of the history of piracy in the 1680s is a chronological list of key events involving pirates between 1680 and 1689.

== Events ==
=== 1680 ===
- Bartholomew Sharp embarks on the "Pacific Adventure", a raid on Spanish settlements on the South American west coast. One crewman, Basil Ringrose, writes an account of the expedition, later published by Alexandre Exquemelin.
- James Misson, Signor Caraccioli and Thomas Tew discover Libertatia on the island of Madagascar.
- John Williams captures James Kelley on a slave ship off the coast of West Africa, making him a crewmember.
- April 15 – Landing on the Isthmus of Darien, John Coxen leads 331 buccaneers, including Bartholomew Sharp, William Dampier, Lionel Wafer, Basil Ringrose, William Dick and John Cox, divided into five groups consisting of Bartholomew Sharp, Richard Sawkins, Peter Harris, John Coxon and Edmund Cook. Marching towards the Spanish stronghold of Santa Maria the buccaneers first met with the Mosquito Indians who had reported it contained a large amount of gold dust. The Spaniards, however, had been warned of their approach and had sent the gold to Panama so by the time the buccaneers reached Santa Maria most of the party were in favour of stealing out on the Pacific Ocean in the Mosquito's canoes. While Coxon and his party were against the proposal, he was persuaded to stay and keep command of the expedition.
- April 19–20 – Travelling in canoes into the Bay of Panama, the buccaneers capture a Spanish vessel of 30 tons as well as a small Spanish barque taken the following day.
- April 23 – Arriving at Panama the buccaneers encountered three Spanish warships, one of which was commanded by Captain Peralta who had previously fought against Sir Henry Morgan's raid on Panama a decade before, engaging in a day-long battle which ended after two of the Spanish ships were boarded thus forcing the remaining ship to retreat. There were 48 casualties consisting of 18 killed and 30 wounded, including Peter Harris who died ten days later.
- May – French buccaneer Michel de Grammont is joined by English privateers William Wright and Thomas Paine at Isla Blanca in a raid on Caracas successfully capturing the Caracas seaport of La Guayra.
- July – After taking the Caracas seaport of La Guayra the previous month, the buccaneers (under Michel de Granmont) are driven from Caracas by Spanish defenders.
- Dutch pirate Herbert Greaves is hanged near Walmer Castle.

=== 1681 ===
- January – A mutiny is made against Bartholomew Sharp and John Watling is elected Captain. He attacks the Spanish settlement of Arica, Chile. He is heavily outnumbered by the Spanish, the attack fails and he is killed.
- Rev. Lancelot Blackburne, later becoming Archbishop of York, sails with buccaneers.
- John Alexander, an officer under Bartholomew Sharp, drowns at sea.
- May–August – William Wright along with eight other privateers, later joined an additional 50 English South Sea sailors, departs the San Blas Islands to raid the Spanish city of Cartago, Costa Rica however many of the privateers miss the rendezvous at San Andrés Island. Despite this setback Wright continues on with French privateers Captain Archambaud and Captain Toccart later capturing a Spanish tartane which he later gives to 30 of the South Sea sailors who refused to sail with the French privateer whom they had joined at San Blias. Sailing towards Corn Island and later Bluefield's River Wright leaves the French privateers.
- September – While at Boca del Toro Wright joined Dutch Captain Yankey Willems, who had no commission of war, and departed the city sailing along the coast of Colombia. Near Cartagena Yankey sized a Spanish ship with a large cargo of sugar and tobacco. Traveling to Curaçao the two attempted to sell the Spanish cargo but are forced to leave by the Dutch governor where they continued to the Aves Island and to the Islas Roques staying until February of the following year.

=== 1682 ===
- Bartholomew Sharp's Pacific Adventure expedition returns by Cape Horn to Barbados before being arrested after their arrival in Port Royal.
- Pierre le Picard is reported by Governor of Jamaica Sir Henry Morgan raiding English and Spanish shipping off the coast of Jamaica. This is the last that is heard of Picard who disappears soon after until his return from a French South Sea buccaneering expedition in 1685.
- May – Thomas Lynch returns as Governor of Jamaica.
- July – Robert Clarke is removed as Governor of the Bahamas as a result of illegally issuing letters of marque against Spanish shipping in Florida. His replacement Richard Lilburne however is unable to halt the piracy in the Bahamas Is.
- October – Jean Hamlin captures between sixteen and eighteen ships near Jamaica before being forced to leave the area by a frigate sent by Governor Thomas Lynch that fails to capture Hamlin.
- December – Another frigate, the Guernsey, is sent by Governor Thomas Lynch to capture Jean Hamlin however Hamlin manages to elude being captured once again. With ex-buccaneers such as John Coxen closing in, Hamlin fled from his base in Ile-la-vache sailing towards St. Thomas where he was given sanctuary by governor Adolph Esmit.

=== 1683 ===
- January – French pirate Jean Hamlin takes the British ship Thomas and William, Richard North commander, near the Isle of Ash, off Hispaniola. Later, the crew reluctantly lets a French man-of-war escorting two Guinea ships continue unharmed. After trading peacefully with Adolph Esmit, Governor of St. Thomas, Hamlin captures a ketch out of Nevis.
- February – An act is passed by the House of Assembly of Jamaica (An Act For the Restraining and Punishing Privateers and Pirates.) prohibiting trade with pirates.
- March – Pirate hunter Thomas Pain, allegedly commissioned by Jamaican Governor Thomas Lynch, leads a group of privateers in a raid against St. Augustine, Florida however they soon withdraw to New Providence after looting several nearby villages.
- May 17–21 – Michel de Grammont, Laurens de Graff and Nicholas van Hoorn lead a group of privateers totalling over 1,000 men in an attack on Veracruz looting the town for four days and ransoming several prominent citizens, including Governor Don Luis de Cordova and visiting Irish merchant John Murphy, before returning to Petit-Goâve with over 800 pesos a man. Nicholas van Hoorn is mortally wounded during a duel with de Graff on Isla de Sacrificios.
- May – Jean Hamlin raids shipping off the coast of Sierra Leone capturing English and Dutch ships. Later that year Hamlin's band split into separate bands with Hamlin returning to the Caribbean. Arriving in St. Thomas in late 1683 or early 1684 Hamlin's ship La Trompeuse was burned in the island's harbor by English naval officer Captain Carlile commanding HMS Francis. Hamlin would be granted refuge in St. Thomas by Danish Governor Adolph Esmit until his removal in October 1684.
- December – Laurens de Graaf leads a successful raid on Cartagena capturing several large ships for his pirate fleet.

=== 1684 ===
- Jean Hamlin forms a new crew commanding La Nouve Trompeuse shortly before the removal of St. Thomas Governor Adolf Esmit where he would travel to the old buccaneer base of Ile-la-vache off the coast of Hispaniola.
- Pierre LePain, wanted by the French government for the return of La Trompeuse stolen in Cayenne several years before, is captured and sent to Petit-Goâve.
- January – In retaliation for the St. Augustine raid in 1683 Spanish forces raid New Providence. Later that year the Spanish burn the town killing several of the settlements defenders and taking others captive to Havana. The remaining survivors flee to Jamaica and the Carolinas as the English Bahamas colony is abandoned.
- April – Jaques Nepveau de Pouancay, acting Governor of Petit-Goâve for former Governor de Franquesnay, is replaced by Pierre-Paul Tarin de Cussy.
- August – Two officials are sent by King Louis XIV to assist in suppressing piracy in French Hispaniola.
- October – Governor Adolph Esmit, one of the last remaining buccaneer supporters, is forced to leave St. Thomas.
- Alexandre Esquemelin's "Buccaneers of America" is published in London.

=== 1685 ===
- One of the last great buccaneering raids is attempted in the unsuccessful attack on the city of Panama by a force of about 3,000 men led by Edward Davis, John Eaton, Charles Swan, and several others. With the outbreak of the War of the Grand Alliance in 1689 these men, as well most of the remaining buccaneers, would become legitimate privateers as the era of buccaneering came to a close.
- Charles Swan sails off the coast of Sinaloa and into the Gulf of California during the winter of 1685–1686 while unsuccessfully awaiting the Spanish Manila galleon. A full account of this voyage is later published in William Dampier's A New Voyage Round the World in 1697.
- May – A fleet of French buccaneers, including Pierre le Picard, crosses the Isthmus of Panama on their way to the South Sea and loot Guayaquil. Later that year Picard leaves the South Sea expedition and returns to the Caribbean. On his way to the Caribbean he attacks and loots the city of Segovia.
- July 6 – Laurens de Graff and Michel de Grammont storm ashore at Campeche with a force of 750 men and begin looting the city for two months while the Armada de Barlovento searches for the buccaneers base on the island of Roatán off the coast of Honduras.
- September – The Armada de Barlovento return to Campeche, with a loss of three ships from a hurricane, the remaining fleet encountered Graff's fleet off Cabo Catoche, on the way back from the raid on Campeche. The armada succeeded in sinking one ship and capturing another. While pursuing Graff's already heavily damaged flagship the explosion of a cannon on one of the armada vessels, killing three gunners, allowed Lorencillo to escape. Held responsible for abandoning the chase several Armada officers were suspended from duty. Two days following the battle Armada commander Ochoa died at sea from a sudden illness. However the Armada had captured 120 sailors, many of whom later defected from La Salle's colony, agreeing to reveal La Salle's plans for a French settlement on a river known as the "Michipipi" in exchange for escaping the death penalty. This information would later lead the Armada de Barlovento to launch a series of expeditions along the Gulf of Mexico to locate this colony.

=== 1686 ===
- Michel de Grammont, sailing from Yucatán along with the rest of the buccaneer fleet, becomes separated from the other ships while trying to evade a storm, and is never seen again.
- The Armada de Barlovento embarks on a three-year expedition to locate and destroy La Salle's colony which French privateers had been using as a base to raid Spanish shipping in the Gulf of Mexico. The expedition would see the rebirth of exploration of the Gulf of Mexico and the southeastern coast of North America which would provide valuable information to future European maps of the region.
- Spanish raiders based in St. Augustine, Florida attack nearby settlements in Charleston, South Carolina as a response to the rising pirate haven in the Carolinas. A counterattack, planned by the French, is prohibited by recently arriving Governor James Colleton.
- March 31 – Captain Swan sails from Cabo Corrientes on an expedition to the Orient. William Dampier later joins Swan's crew on the Cygnet.
- October 26 – The British frigate HMS Bauden is attacked by a French pirate vessel Le Trompeuse.

=== 1687 ===
- Future governor of Massachusetts William Phips salvages a Spanish treasure ship, worth around £300,000, off the coast of northern Hispaniola. He is knighted for this deed.
- Based near the Tres Marias Islands at the mouth of the Gulf of California around 50 French buccaneers, later joined by 30 more, and led by Captain Franz Rools begin raiding Spanish shipping and coastal settlements in New Spain and Peru. The buccaneers continue their attacks from Navidad to Mazatlán including the towns of Sentispac, Acaponeta, and Rosario until mid 1689. While the buccaneers regularly searched between Baja California and Cape Corrientes for the incoming Spanish Manila treasure galleon the buccaneers are unable to locate it.
- An anti-buccaneering expedition commanded by Sir Robert Holmes arrives in Charleston, South Carolina.
- Christopher Goffe is pardoned after surrendering to authorities in Boston, Massachusetts and is commissioned as a pirate hunter.
- January – Captain Joseph Bannister, an English pirate who had eluded capture by Jamaican authorities for over two years, is captured and hanged on HMS Ruby in Port Royal.
- December – The Duke of Albemarle arrives in Port Royal as Governor of Jamaica.

=== 1688 ===
- James II issues his 1687/8 Act of Grace.
- Pierre le Picard arrives at Hispaniola and later that year retires to Acadie (Southeast Canada).

=== 1689 ===
- Jean Bart and Claude de Forbin are captured by the Royal Navy and taken to Plymouth. Three days later they escape to Brittany in a rowing boat manned by 20 other sailors.
- April–March — Thomas Pound, formerly a mariner under Governor Edmund Andros, begins raiding coastal shipping soon after the Jacobite takeover of the New England colony of Pemaquid.
- July 8 — Thomas Pound, with six men including Thomas Hawkins, Thomas Johnson, Eleazer Buck, John Siccaden, Richard Griffen and Benjamin Blake sailed a sloop to Lovell's Island where they were joined by sailors Daniel Lander, Samuel Watts, William Warren, William Dun and Henry Dripper.
- August 16 — Thomas Pound captures the sloop Godspeed near Race Point. Exchanging their smaller ship for the Godspeed the Captain, John Smart, is sent with a message from Pound to Boston authorities that he knew where the English naval sloop was located. However, if they continued to pursue Pound "she should find hot work for they would die every man before they would be taken."
- The Armada de Barlovento locates La Salle's colony during an overland march, led by commander Alonso De León, from Coahuila discovered La Salle's Fort St. Louis near the head of Lavaca Bay (present day Victoria County, Texas).
- Laurens de Graff accepts a commission in the French navy as a Major by Governor Pierre-Paul Tarin de Cussy on the outbreak of the War of the Grand Alliance.
- Petit-Goâve Governor de Cussy commands a buccaneering expedition against the Spanish settlement of Santiago de los Caballeros, Honduras.
- October — Petit-Goâve Governor de Cussy leads a buccaneering expedition against Montego Bay in Jamaica.
- December — Petit-Goâve Governor de Cussy again raids Montego Bay in Jamaica.

== Births ==
- 1689 – Lars Gathenhielm

== Deaths ==
- 1683 – Nicholas van Hoorn
- 1684 – Michiel Andrieszoon
