= Jean Tristan (pirate) =

French corsair (buccaneer) and pirate

Jean Tristan (Note: Last name also Tristram, Tristian, or Tristrian. Naturalized as a British subject in 1688, his first name may occasionally be John.) (died 1693) was a French corsair (buccaneer) and pirate active in the Caribbean and against Spanish holdings in Central and South America.

== History ==
Tristan was part of a large buccaneer flotilla (including John Coxon, Thomas Paine, Jan Willems, and others) which attacked the Pacific coast of Costa Rica in early 1681 after raiding off Colombia with Laurens de Graff the previous year. That May he took aboard a party of English sailors under John Cook which had split with Bartholomew Sharp's raiders. Among Cook's crew were William Dampier and Edward Davis; they left Sharp's camp with the help of native guides, whom they paid using trinkets bought from Tristan's men. Tristan rejoined the larger fleet after transferring the Englishmen to another ship, but became separated from them and was forced to flee after encountering several Spanish warships near Bocas del Toro.

In late 1682 he was back in the Caribbean where he met again with Jan Willems off of Ile a Vache. Among Willems’ crew were Cook and his sailors, who rejoined Tristan after their own ship had been confiscated. Soon afterwards Cook and the English sailors stole Tristan's ship while he and his French crew were ashore. Tristan eventually met Nicholas van Hoorn, who in 1683 gave him a replacement vessel for a combined assault on Veracruz alongside Michel de Grammont. Tristan sailed with Grammont through 1685, raiding Campeche and other targets before leaving late that year for Guinea.

In 1688 Tristan sailed to Jamaica; as a French Protestant (Huguenot) he was no longer welcome in Catholic France and so he became a naturalized English subject. He was commanding a merchant vessel on trading (possibly smuggling) voyage to Panama in 1693 when the Spanish seized his vessel and hanged Tristan with all his crew. Jamaican Governor William Beeston traded angry letters with Spanish officials, condemning their harsh treatment of English citizens; the Spanish Audiencia President responded that Tristan was “known to be one of the greatest pirates in America. Had he been brought in alive, I should have punished him.”

== See also ==
- Jacob Evertson - Another corsair who briefly sailed with Tristan when he left Ile a Vache.
