= Raid on Cartagena (1683) =

17th century pirate raid in Colombia

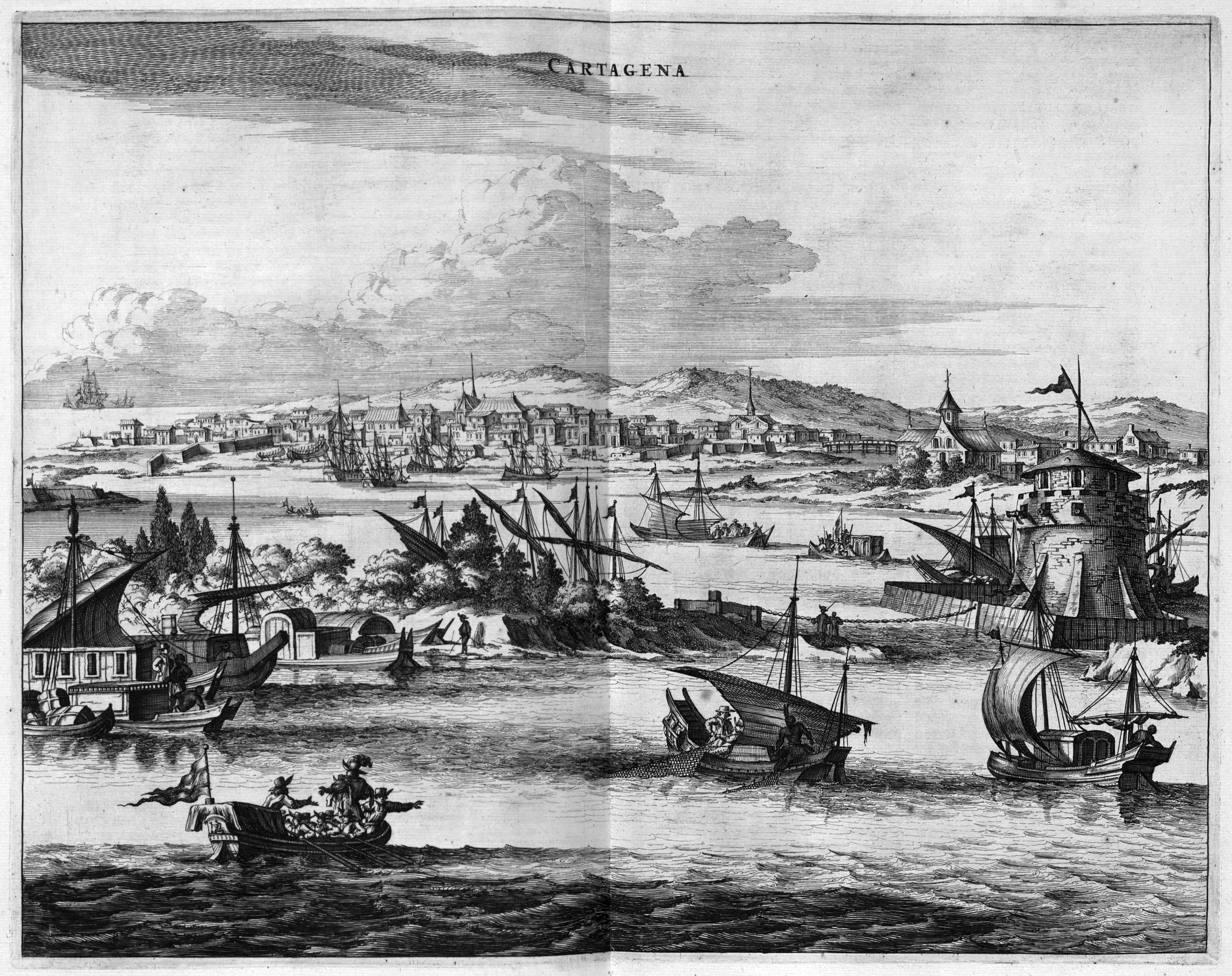
Cartagena in the 17th century.

The Raid on Cartagena was the successful counter-attack against vessels sent to defend the city of Cartagena de Indias (modern-day Colombia) and the subsequent blockade of the city by Laurens de Graaf and his pirate compatriots.

== Precursors ==
In May 1683, de Graaf had successfully attacked Veracruz with the assistance of Nicholas van Hoorn. The two subsequently had a falling-out and de Graaf wounded van Hoorn on the Isla de Sacrificios. Van Hoorn later died when the wound became infected. De Graaf and his fleet sailed south, arriving off the coast of modern-day Colombia in November 1683 where they held for almost a month, preparing to infiltrate Cartagena in the same way as they had Veracruz.

== The raid ==
To prevent an attack, governor Juan de Pando Estrada commandeered three private slave ships - the 40-gun San Francisco, the 34-gun Paz and a smaller 28-gun galliot. 800 Spanish, led by a 26-year-old commander, set out to meet the pirates on Christmas Eve but immediately struggled against De Graaf's more experienced men. 90 Spaniards were killed compared to only 20 pirates. The San Francisco was grounded and the other two ships were captured. De Graaf re-floated the San Francisco as his new flagship and renamed it the Fortune, later the Neptune. Michiel Andrieszoon took the Paz and renamed it the Mutine ("Rascal") and Yankey Willems was given command of the Francesca. The group released a large number of Spanish prisoners on Christmas Day and sent them ashore with a note for Governor Estrada thanking him for the Christmas presents. The pirates then proceeded to blockade the town and ransom their remaining hostages.

== Relief ==
In January 1684 an English convoy, led by the 48-gun HMS Ruby, arrived carrying a note for de Graaf from his wife offering a Spanish pardon and letter of marque. De Graaf ignored the note, not trusting the Spanish to keep their promises, and instead invited English officers to board his vessels and trade with his men. The English were then allowed to continue to Cartagena's port without incident and soon after, de Graaf and his compatriots left for Petit-Goâve.
