= William Wright (privateer) =

English privateer and buccaneer

William Wright (fl. 1675-1682) was an English privateer in French service and later buccaneer who raided Spanish towns in the late 17th century.

== History ==
Little is known of William Wright before he settled in French Hispaniola in the mid-1670s. Accepting a French commission of war from the French Governor in 1675 he later raided the Spanish colony of Segovia (present day Nicaragua) with several other privateers.

Sailing to the San Blas Islands in 1679 he recruited several sailors before traveling to the Mosquito Coast encountering an old friend named John Gret. Returning to the San Blas Islands, Gret negotiated on Wright's behalf to form an alliance with the local natives. However, despite this alliance the privateers, led by Jean Bernanos, were defeated after an attempted attack on the Spanish town of Chepo several weeks later.

Soon after the raid Wright left Petit Goâve with Captain Thomas Paine sailing the Spanish Main from Cartagena to Caracas capturing a ship escorted by the Spanish Armada de Barlovento.

In May 1680, while at Isla Blanca, Wright and Paine joined French buccaneer Captain Michel de Grammont later capturing La Guayra seaport in Caracas before being driven off by the Spanish defenders in July. Shortly afterwards he paired with buccaneer Jacob Evertson, antagonizing the Dutch off Curacao.

In May of the following year Wright commanded a small barque of four guns with a crew of forty men. Joined by eight other privateers, in addition to fifty English South Sea buccaneers, Wright sailed from the San Blas Islands intending to raid a Spanish city, most likely the city of Cartago in Costa Rica, however many of the privateers missed the rendezvous at San Andrés Island. Wright continued on capturing a Spanish tartane which he gave to thirty of the English South Seas sailors who had refused to sail under the French privateer whom they had sailed from San Blas Island.

Wright, with French Captains Archembeau and Toccart, sailed to Corn Island and then to Bluefield's River where he left the French privateers. Arriving in Bocas del Toro several weeks later Wright joined with Dutch Captain Yankey Willems, who himself had no commission, and departed with Yanky from Boca del Toro in September sailing south along Colombia where Yanky captured a Spanish merchant ship carrying sugar and tobacco. Wright receiving Yanky's barque, as Yanky kept the merchant ship, burned his own ship and sold the Spanish tartane he had taken near Cartago to one of the Jamaican traders on board. At Curaçao they attempted to sell the Spanish cargo but were forced to leave by the Dutch Governor. They continued to sail to the Isla Aves and Islas Roques where they remained until February 1682. Returning to Islas Roques later in 1682, Wright parted from Willems, where he and his crew divided their loot and dispersed. Wright may have returned to his home in French Hispaniola. William Dampier, who had been sailing as a member of Wrights's and Willems' crew, left with John Cook and others to return to Virginia before returning to buccaneering.

== See also ==
- Edward Davis - Succeeded Cook as Captain and returned to raid the same areas as Wright and company
- Lionel Wafer - Buccaneer rescued by Wright's fleet near San Blas; like Dampier, he a lengthy account of his adventures
