= Francois Le Sage =

17th century buccaneer

- Died: 1694; Jamaica
- Occupation: Pirate
- Known for: Associated with fellow buccaneers Michiel Andrieszoon and Laurens de Graaf
- Piratical career
- Other names: Lesage
- Base of operations: Caribbean
- Commands: Tigre

Francois Le Sage (died 1694) was a pirate and buccaneer active in the Caribbean and off the coast of Africa. He is primarily associated with fellow buccaneers Michiel Andrieszoon and Laurens de Graaf.

== History ==
Le Sage, alternately described as Dutch or French, was first reported as part of Laurens de Graaf's fleet of flibustiers (French buccaneers) sailing against the Spanish in late 1682, and participating in the sack of Veracruz in early 1683. Later that year the Governor of Santo Domingo authorized a retaliatory raid on the Spanish at Santiago de Cuba, led by de Graaf but under the overall command of a militia Major. When the Major attempted to discipline one of the buccaneers, they mutinied and the raid was called off.

Instead they sailed to Cartagena alongside Michiel Andrieszoon, Jan Willems, Francois Grogniet, and others, where they blockaded the port and captured two large Spanish ships in December 1683. de Graaf took one of the Spanish prizes as his own, giving his former ship to Willems. Andreiszoon took the other prize and gave his old ship Tigre (which was itself a former Spanish ship he had received from de Graaf) to Le Sage, who had lost the barca-longa off Cuba.

Le Sage picked up 60 additional crew from Jean Hamlin’s ship Trompeuse (Trickster), which had been destroyed by the English in 1683. The Governor of Jamaica thanked de Graaf for his offer of assistance against he Spanish but noted that “Francois LeSage behaves very differently, for he has frequently injured and insulted our ships, and has by present report 60 pirates on board his ship taken from La Trompeuse.”

Now with the 30-gun, 130-man Tigre, Le Sage attempted to sail south around the Straits of Magellan to raid in the South Seas. Poor timing and contrary winds prevented their making the Straits, so Le Sage turned eastward and attacked Dutch shipping off Africa's Guinea coast for two years. Returning to the Caribbean, he joined de Graaf for various raids and counter-raids throughout the area. In 1694 he once more sailed with de Graaf for a raid on Jamaica. The raid was generally successful, capturing thousands of slaves, but Le Sage was killed ashore with fifty of his men while attacking fortified plantations.

== See also ==
- Michel de Grammont, another buccaneer who sailed with de Graaf, Willems, and company.
