= Raid on Cartagena =

Raid on Cartagena may refer to:

- Raid on Cartagena (1683)
- Raid on Cartagena (1697)
