= Jean Tristan =

Jean Tristan may refer to:

- Jean Tristan (pirate) (died 1693), French corsair (buccaneer) and pirate
- Jean Tristan, Count of Valois (1250–1270), French prince of the Capetian dynasty
