= Anolis pecuarius =

Scientific classification
- Kingdom: Animalia
- Phylum: Chordata
- Class: Reptilia
- Order: Squamata
- Suborder: Iguania
- Family: Dactyloidae
- Genus: Anolis
- Species: A. pecuarius

Binomial name
- Anolis pecuarius Schwartz, 1969

Species of lizard

Anolis pecuarius, the Île-à-Vache green anole, is a species of lizard in the family Dactyloidae. The species is found on Île-à-Vache in Haiti.
