= Michiel Andrieszoon =

- Born: Netherlands
- Died: 1724
- Piratical career
- Nickname: Michel Andrieszoon; Mitchel Andrieszoon; Michiel l'Andresson; Michiel Landresson
- Type: Buccaneer
- Allegiance: Dutch
- Years active: 1680s
- Rank: Captain
- Base of operations: Caribbean
- Commands: le Tigre
- Battles: Raid of Veracruz (1683); Battle of Cartagena (1683)

Michiel Andrieszoon (fl. 1683–1684) was a Dutch buccaneer who served as lieutenant to Captain Laurens de Graaf. He commanded the le Tigre, with a 300-man crew and between 30 and 36 guns. He is occasionally referred to in English as Michel or Mitchell, and is often erroneously given the nickname "Bréha Michiel".

In 1683, he was one of the leaders of the attack on Veracruz. This was one of the last major buccaneering raids in the Spanish Main and included such captains as Yankey Willems, Nicholas van Hoorn and Michel de Grammont. He was with de Graaf when they rendezvoused with the rest of the fleet from Petit-Goâve in February 1683. The two men had two ships, a bark and a sloop, and 500 men. Andrieszoon took part in raiding Spanish ships in the Bay of Honduras and off the coast of Central America for several weeks. They arrived at Veracruz on May 17 and, after some reconnaissance, attacked at dawn the following morning and successfully looted the Spanish stronghold.

In late November, Andrieszoon was with de Graff, Yankey Willems, Francois Le Sage and several others for the raid on Cartagena. When Viceroy Juan de Pando Estrada was informed of the buccaneers' presence, he ordered three Spanish warships to confront them. On December 23, the small squadron sailed out to meet the enemy fleet. Under the command of 26-year-old Captain Andres de Pez y Malzarraga were the 40-gun San Francisco, the 34-gun Paz and a 28-gun galliot carrying 800 soldiers. Instead of fleeing, the smaller ships sailed around the Spaniards, confusing its gunners. The San Francisco ran aground early in the battle, the galliot was captured by Willems, while the Paz struck after four hours of fighting. Casualties were relatively light, with only twenty buccaneers and ninety soldiers killed and the rest taken prisoner. The buccaneers took the warships for themselves, de Graaf raising the San Francisco and making it his new flagship, and later released the prisoners with a message for the governor thanking him for the Christmas present. Andrieszoon took Paz for his own, giving Tigre to Le Sage. Andrieszoon presumably remained with the expedition as they maintained the blockade for three weeks, before de Graff headed northwest for Roatan and Saint Domingue.

Over the next two years Andrieszoon returned to the Caribbean alongside Willems, taking ships near Cuba before sailing north to resupply in New England. Afterwards they and several others raided off the Spanish Main, eventually sacking Campeche in 1685 before returning to Santo Domingo to retire. A 1724 newspaper noted the death of a former buccaneer named Michel, likely Andrieszoon:

Some Days ago died Capt. Michel, a very aged and learned Gentleman, who had been a great Traveller, and was esteem'd one of the greatest Masters both at the small and great Sword of any that made it not their Profession. He spent his younger Years among the Buccaniers of America; but notwithstanding that rough Education, was well known to be a polite Gentleman. He was a near Relation of Major Sigismond Augustavus Michel, that died not long since, and left behind him a very deserving Character.

== See also ==
- Nicolas Brigaut - French buccaneer who served as Andrieszoon's quartermaster. Whey they traveled to Boston to resupply, Brigaut purchased a ship of his own and parted from Andrieszoon.
