= Thomas Paine (privateer) =

Colonial American privateer

- Born: c. 1632
- Died: 1715
- Occupation: Privateer
- Piratical career
- Type: Privateer/Pirate
- Commands: The Pearl

Thomas Paine (c. 1632–1715) was a colonial American privateer and pirate who, during the late 17th century, raided several Spanish settlements. He participated in a raid with Jan Willems, looting Rio de la Hacha in 1680 as well as driving the French out of Block Island. In June of the same year, Paine joined forces with Michel de Grammont and a captain named Wright at Blanquilla Island. Together with 50 men they successfully raided the town of Cumana although it was defended by 2,000 Spanish soldiers.

In 1682, Paine accepted a pardon from the governor of Jamaica.

A resident of Jamestown, Rhode Island, Paine acquired a commission from Jamaica's governor Sir Thomas Lynch which instructed him to "seize, kill, and destroy pirates"; however, in March 1683, he joined the privateers John Markham, Jan Corneliszoon, Conway Woolley and a French Captain "Bréhal" (actually a nickname of Michiel Andrieszoon) in a raid against the Spanish town of Saint Augustine, Florida. In command of an eight-gun barque, the Pearl, Paine led his crew of sixty men under the command of Captain Bréhal, who possessed a French privateering commission obtained from Jacques Nepveu, sieur de Pouanéay and governor of Saint Domingue.

As did the others, Paine sailed under a French flag as the fleet arrived off the Florida coast. However, finding the Spanish had prepared for their arrival in advance, they were forced to withdraw, eventually abandoning their raid after looting the surrounding area (although they did release several captive before their departure).

Returning with Bréhal and Markham to New Providence, they were reportedly wanted by governor Robert Lilburne, who wished to detain both Markham and Paine for violating England's peace agreement with Spain; however he was unable to do so "for want of a force", and they eventually left the Bahamas to join Corneliszoon and Woolley in salvaging the wrecked Spanish treasure galleon, the Nuestra Senora de las Maravillas.

Their efforts apparently met little success and he and Bréhal sailed north to resupply at Rhode Island. Although New England was traditionally friendly towards privateers, the two were arrested on orders by visiting governor Edward Cranfield who charged Paine with carrying a counterfeit commission. Paine was eventually cleared and Bréhal allowed to leave.

Paine stayed in Rhode Island and eventually went into semi-retirement, becoming involved in the cargo and resailing for local pirates including Captain William Kidd, who visited Paine in 1699.
