= Peter Johnson (pirate) =

Dutch pirate

Peter Johnson (died 1672, real name possibly Pieter Janszoon) was a Dutch pirate active in the Caribbean. He is best known for the circumstances surrounding his trial.

== History ==
Johnson may have arrived in Jamaica as early as 1661 aboard a slave ship captured by the English. By 1671 Governor Thomas Lynch offered a pardon to pirates who turned themselves in; hearing of the offer, Johnson along with a few men left port in Jamaica and joined with an English pirate captain named Thurston to capture a Spanish frigate, “killing the captain and 12 or 14 more.” With their crew now increased to “90 desperate rogues” they looted several ships off Havana before being chased away by a flotilla led by future Jamaican Governor William Beeston. Returning to Cuban waters “they took a great ship laden with wines from the Canaries, killing a Governor, two captains, and eighteen men.”

Now ready to take the pardon, Johnson returned to Jamaica but lost his ship and plunder in a storm. He and his crew survived but were captured and held for trial. Lynch was under pressure to preserve peace with Spain. He had great animosity toward buccaneer Henry Morgan (who would soon become lieutenant governor), and was eager to take a public stand against piracy. He railed against pirates, privateers, and their supporters: “this cursed trade has been so long followed, and there is so many of it, that like weeds or Hydras they spring up as fast as we can cut them down.” In September 1672 Johnson was tried and freely admitted to many piracies - he “confessed enough to hang 100 honester persons” – yet he was acquitted by the jury, despite Lynch ordering the Judge “to be sure not to let him be acquitted.” Infuriated by the verdict, Lynch ordered Johnson tried a second time and personally directed the retrial. Johnson was convicted and hanged; his crew was reprieved and returned to London. Lynch's conduct during the trial led him to be questioned by English authorities, and he found that Jamaican residents resented his heavy-handed approach: among locals, Johnson's death was “as much regretted as if he had been as pious and innocent as one of the primitive martyrs.”

== See also ==
- Jelles de Lecat – Another Dutch pirate whom Beeston's flotilla was sent to destroy on Lynch's orders.
