= Battle of Veracruz (disambiguation) =

The Battle of Veracruz may refer to:

- Attack on Veracruz (1683) pirate attack on Veracruz in Spanish Colonial Mexico
- Siege of Veracruz (1821), during the Mexican war of independence
- Battle of Veracruz (1825), during the attempts of Spanish reconquest
- Battle of Veracruz (1838), a French attack on Veracruz during the Pastry War
- Siege of Veracruz (1847), an American siege on the Mexican city of Veracruz during the Mexican-American War
- Siege of Veracruz, either of two rebel attacks on Veracruz during the Mexican Reform War of 1857–1861
- Battle of Veracruz (1914), an American attack on Veracruz during the United States occupation of Veracruz
