= Jacob Evertson =

Dutch buccaneer

- Died: 1688 or 1695
- Other name: James or Everson
- Known for: Escaped Henry Morgan and sailed with Jan Willems for several years
- Piratical career
- Base of operations: Caribbean

Jacob Evertson (died 1688 or 1695, also known as James or Everson) was a Dutch buccaneer and pirate active in the Caribbean. He escaped Henry Morgan and sailed with Jan Willems for several years.

== Biography ==
=== Early piracy ===
Evertson captured a brigantine near Jamaica in early 1681. Famed buccaneer Henry Morgan had become the Lieutenant Governor and dispatched a ship to capture Evertson's sloop and his mixed Spanish-English crew. Morgan's men mounted a stealthy midnight attack, surprising the pirates and capturing their ships. Evertson and a number of his crew jumped ship and attempted to swim to safety. Morgan published accounts of the capture for the public; he announced that Evertson and the other escapees had been shot and killed as they tried to swim away. Captured Spanish sailors were deported to Cartagena; the English prisoners were tried, convicted of piracy, and hung. Morgan kept Evertson's sloop, using it as a scout for his frigate.

=== Another ship ===
In fact Evertson had survived the escape and continued his piratical career. Obtaining another ship, he partnered with fellow Dutch pirate Jan “Yankey” Willems, sailing together. After several years at sea they sailed to South Carolina in 1687 - possibly to retire or seek a pardon, though unsuccessfully - and soon returned to Jamaica. There they wrote to Governor Molesworth in September asking for a pardon. He welcomed them and offered a pardon on condition that Yankey and Evertson dismantle their ships to keep them from returning to piracy.

At the time Yankey had a 40-gun 100-man Dutch ship while Evertson sailed a 26-gun, 50-man barque. Despite many of their men having deserted, the two pirates refused to destroy their ships, pleading with Molesworth, “We beg you to consider that if our ships are broken up we shall be left destitute of all livelihood in present and future, and to allow us the use of them. We have neither of us money to purchase an estate ashore.” Molesworth repeated his demand, and the pirates sailed away.

=== Larger crew ===
Their crews bolstered by sailors picked up from Jean Hamlin’s crew (and possibly Joseph Bannister’s), the pair continued piracy. Partnering with Laurens de Graaf, Michel de Grammont, and other buccaneers, they took part in sacking Cartagena in 1683. Yankey, presumably with Evertson, captured a rich Spanish vessel off Havana in 1686. In early 1688 they attacked a Spanish “urca” cargo ship near Puerto Cavallos. After an eight-hour battle they captured it; Yankey may have taken it as his own.

=== Possible death ===
Though it is not recorded how or where they perished, by August 1688 both Yankey and Evertson were reported dead. At least one source reported Evertson still alive at Santo Domingo the following year, dying in 1695 in English service. Their remaining crew members signed on with Captain Peterson.

== See also ==
- Jelles “Yellows” Lecat - another buccaneer who sailed with Morgan but later turned to piracy.
