= College Harry Brakeman =

Private school in Haiti

Location
- Petit-Goave
- Coordinates: 18.595°N 72.307°W

Information
- Type: Private
- Religious affiliation(s): United Methodist
- Opened: 1976
- Grades: 1 to 13

College Harry Brakeman is a United Methodist school (primary and secondary) in Haiti. It is run by the Eglise Méthodiste d'Haïti (Methodist Church of Haiti).

== History ==
The school was built in the 1970s by United Methodist pastor Harry Brakeman and his wife, Ella Brakeman, of Michigan, with the help of numerous team members, who were construction volunteers, looking to do mission work while escaping Michigan's winters.

The school had an enrollment of about 900 students as of 2015.

In January 2010, the 7.0 magnitude earthquake that devastated much of Haiti caused considerable damage to the town of Petit-Goâve, followed by a 5.9 magnitude aftershock centered directly below the town. Due to good construction techniques, the school suffered little damage (only a crack in the parts built under Harry's watchful eyes). The computer lab, which was built around 2008 above the school's auditorium, by Haitians, went down to dust. The unfinished computer lab had not been built to the same Brakeman standards as the rest of the school, and was destroyed in the quake and aftershocks.

Following the quake, the Methodist Church of Haiti and United Methodist Volunteers in Mission (UMVIM) partnered with Kansas-based United Methodist Church of the Resurrection to help the church rebuild Petit-Goâve.

The school was featured in the 400th episode of the NPR program This American Life.
