= Nicolas Brigaut =

French pirate and buccaneer

- Born: c. 1653
- Died: 1686 (aged 32–33)
- Cause of death: Hanged
- Occupations: Pirate and buccaneer
- Known for: Association with fellow corsair Michel de Grammont
- Piratical career
- Base of operations: Caribbean

Nicolas Brigaut (c. 1653–1686) was a French pirate and buccaneer active in the Caribbean. He was closely associated with fellow corsair Michel de Grammont.

== History ==
Brigaut first went to sea in 1679, surviving a shipwreck before joining the flibustier (French buccaneer) fleet of Sieur de Grammont. Over the next few years he was part of their expeditions attacking Cumana, Maracaibo, and Cartagena. By 1683 he had risen to the position of quartermaster aboard the ship La Mutine commanded by Michiel Andrieszoon. Andrieszoon sailed up the American east coast to Boston to resupply in late 1684. While there Brigaut purchased a 40-ton sloop of his own.

Now in command of his own vessel, he and other buccaneers gathered off the coast of Caracas for another raid which never materialized. The pirates dispersed, and Brigaut left to find Grammont, with whom he sailed in a 1685 attack on Campeche alongside Laurens de Graaf. While there Brigaut transferred to command of a captured Spanish galliot. Afterwards he sailed for Roatan, where he rendezvoused with Grammont's ship Le Hardi. Grammont and Brigaut conspired to attack the Spanish again at Saint Augustine, Florida, possibly with help from English colonists in Charleston.

They arrived off Florida at the end of April 1686. Grammont sent Brigaut ahead to Matanzas Inlet to capture guides and interpreters and gather intelligence on Saint Augustine. Brigaut's men captured several Indians and Spaniards but were attacked by a contingent of Spanish soldiers. Brigaut's forces retreated to their ship; during the night a storm forced his ship aground. The Frenchmen tried to come ashore but met resistance, then failing to free the galliot, they returned to the beach and marched overland to await rescue by Grammont. The Governor of Florida sent additional soldiers who attacked Brigaut and his men, slaughtering over forty of them (including their Spanish prisoners) and leaving alive only Brigaut, a black sailor named Diego, (Note: Alternately named Jacques. He is sometimes cited as Brigaut’s own quartermaster, which would make him one of the highest-ranked pirates thought to have been a black African (as opposed to “mulatto” or mixed-race) pirate.) and a young boy.

The Spanish Governor interrogated Brigaut and Diego, at first mistaking Brigaut for Spanish turncoat Alonso de Avesilla thanks to Brigaut having flown Spanish flags to disguise his ship. Brigaut revealed their plan to attack Saint Augustine and confirmed the involvement of men from the Carolinas. He also confessed that La Salle had established a French colony in Mississippi, which alarmed the Governor. Brigaut and Diego were hanged at the end of May 1686. (Note: The fate of the boy - sometimes described as only nine years old - is not recorded.) Grammont himself tried approaching the coast in Le Hardi but was run aground just as Brigaut had been; his ship was lost with all hands.

The Lords Proprietors wrote to Governor James Colleton of South Carolina early the following year, warning him to restrain his colonists from dealing with pirates or attacking the Spanish. They cautioned that:

…the people of Carolina have received the pirates who have unjustly burned and robbed the houses of the Spaniards. Could any rational man doubt that the Spaniards would seek revenge, and would be justified in seeking it, if this be true? We have also been informed that a design was on foot in Carolina to take St. Augustine, which our Government was ready to countenance, being persuaded that they were justified by our clause permitting invaders to be pursued beyond the bounds of our province. But that clause means only a pursuit in heat of victory, not a granting of commissions and a deliberate invasion of the King of Spain's dominions.

== See also ==
- John King - a boy of 9–12 years of age who sailed with pirate Samuel Bellamy, and who is often cited as the youngest pirate of the Golden Age. The boy captured with Brigaut may have been even younger.
