= Jan Willems (Dutch buccaneer) =

Dutch privateer

- Born: Dutch Republic
- Died: 1688; Gulf of Honduras
- Piratical career
- Nickname: Jankey Willems; Yankey Willems
- Type: Buccaneer
- Allegiance: Dutch Republic
- Years active: 1680s
- Rank: Captain
- Base of operations: Petit-Goâve
- Commands: the Princesa
- Battles: Raid of Rio de la Hacha (1680); Raid of Vera Cruz (1683); Raid of Cartagena (1684); Raid of Campeche (1685)

Jan Willems (died 1688), also known as Janke or Yankey Willems, was a 17th-century Dutch buccaneer. Based out of Petit-Goâve, Willems participated in a number of expeditions against the Spanish during the early to mid-1680s with other well-known privateers including Michiel Andrieszoon, Thomas Paine, Laurens de Graaf, Nicholas van Hoorn and Michel de Grammont.

== Biography ==
Although a Dutchman, Willems worked with English privateers during the first years of his buccaneering career raiding Rio de la Hacha with Thomas Paine in 1680. In September 1681, he and English privateer William Wright sailed together from Bocas del Toro. Although Willems did not have a commission himself, he captured a Spanish merchantman with a cargo of sugar and tobacco while sailing with Wright south along the Caribbean coast of New Granada actual Colombia. Taking the Spanish prize as his own, he gave his old barque to Wright who burned his own ship. They attempted to sell the Spanish cargo at Curaçao, however they were forced to leave by the governor. He and Wright then sailed to the Islas Las Aves and Los Roques where they remained until February 1682 and presumably parted ways soon after. During next year, he was among those present at a conference on Roatan in one of the largest held gatherings of the "Brethren of the Coast".

Willems, along with Laurens de Graaf, Nicholas van Hoorn and Michel de Grammont, successfully raided Vera Cruz on May 17, 1683. Using two captured Spanish galleons in the vanguard, he and Laurens de Graaf were able to sneak into the Spanish harbor during the early morning hours and landed a small force on shore. The buccaneers caught the garrison off guard, many of the soldiers still sleeping, and took out the city's defenses allowing the rest of the fleet to enter the harbor. After three or four days, Willems and the others looted the town before retreating at the sight of the New Spain fleet. In late-November, he joined Michiel Andrieszoon, Francois Le Sage and Laurens de Graaf in attacking Spanish shipping off Cartagena resulting in an altercation with Governor Juan de Pando Estrada who commandeered two Spanish slavers to go after them.

Governor of Jamaica Thomas Lynch tried to hire Willems to capture French pirate Jean Hamlin in 1683 after two Navy ships and pirate-turned-pirate-hunter John Coxon failed; Willems refused Lynch's offer.

He participated in de Graaf's later raids against Cartagena in 1684 and Campeche in 1685. After the raid on Cartagena, de Graff gave Willems his old flagship, the Princesa. After having sailed alongside fellow Dutch buccaneer Jacob Evertson for several years, Willems reportedly died in the Gulf of Honduras in 1688, possibly alongside Evertson; their remaining crew members signed on with Captain Peterson.
