= Jean Hamlin =

17th-century French buccaneer

- Occupation: Pirate
- Years active: 1682-1684
- Known for: Often associated with St. Thomas's pirate-friendly Governor Adolph Esmit
- Piratical career
- Other names: John/Jean, Hamlin/Hamyln, Pierre Egron
- Base of operations: Caribbean and off the coast of Africa
- Commands: Trompeuse, La Nouvelle Trompeuse

Jean Hamlin (died 1696, real name likely Pierre Egron) was a French pirate active in the Caribbean and off the coast of Africa. He was often associated with St. Thomas's pirate-friendly Governor Adolph Esmit.

== History ==
Hamlin began his career in 1682, sailing from Jamaica in a small sloop loaded with 120 men, which took a frigate they renamed La Trompeuse (The Trickster), (Note: Buccaneer Michiel Andrieszoon was active off South America in the same time period; his ships Le Tigre and La Mutine were occasionally confused for Hamlin's Trompeuse.) which itself had changed hands between a number of pirates. Given command of the prize, he quickly looted eighteen Jamaican ships, causing Jamaica's Governor Thomas Lynch to send two ships after him. The first missed him; the second, HMS Guernsey, found Hamlin but was outpaced by the freshly careened Trompeuse, which "sailed three feet to his one." Lynch recruited retired pirate turned pirate-hunter John Coxon to bring in Hamlin, but he was unsuccessful. Lynch then tried hiring buccaneer Jan "Yankey" Willems, who refused even to look for Hamlin.

Aware that Lynch was actively seeking his capture, Hamlin left his hideout at Île-à-Vache and sailed to St. Thomas where he was sheltered by Danish Governor Adolph Esmit. Early in 1683 he began attacking English ships near Hispaniola (letting a French ship go free), returning to St. Thomas where Esmit helped him sell off his plunder. Hamlin did not try to hide behind a privateering commission: off St. Thomas a French warship confronted him and asked, "how she dared fire at ships flying French colours? The pirate answered that he was a robber."

Hamlin sailed for Sierra Leone off the African coast in May, capturing seventeen Dutch and English vessels. Some of his crew split off under a Captain Morgan, taking a prize ship with them. Hamlin returned to St. Thomas with a fortune described as "a very large chest of gold-dust, 150 piggs (Note: Ingots.) of silver, 200 bags of coined money, besides plate, jewels, elephant's teeth [and] other valuable goods and commodities." He had reportedly been very cruel to the crews of captured ships during his African voyages, leading Nevis' Governor William Stapleton to call him "John Hamlin, the arch murderer and torturer."

The English found him at St Thomas in late 1683 and HMS Francis attacked. They were fired on not only by the 32-gun Trompeuse but by the Danish fort, which infuriated the English. Finally the English captured and burned Trompeuse, which exploded and set fire to another vessel left in the harbor. (Note: This was the Trinity, formerly Santissima Trinidad, which had been abandoned by pirate and buccaneer Bartholomew Sharp in 1681.) Hamlin escaped and Esmit protected him at Charlotte Amalie yet again. Hamlin formed a new crew late in 1684 for his ship La Nouvelle Trompeuse (The New Trickster), (Note: Some sources say the new ship was named La Résolution.) which had been fitted out in New England. Esmit was removed from his post by exasperated Danish officials in October 1684, so Hamlin left for his old refuge at Île-à-Vache, and then to Brazil. There are few records of his subsequent activities, though almost fifty of his former crew signed aboard the ships of buccaneer Jacob Evertson and privateer Jan Willems, who had previously refused to hunt down Hamlin. After Willems and Evertson died in early 1688, their remaining crew (some of them formerly Hamlin's) sailed with Captain Peterson. Hamlin may have sailed with Francois Le Sage for a time. Afterward he reportedly married on St. Thomas in 1688 and lived there until his death in 1696.

The original Trompeuse which burned at St. Thomas was reportedly found by divers in 1990 but its authenticity is disputed. Legends persist that Hamlin's loot – "treasure room was full of silver … over 24,000 pounds there" – is still aboard.

== In popular culture ==
The TV show Caribbean Pirate Treasure Season 1 Episode 3 aired on 20 August 2017. Philippe Cousteau Jr., the grandson of Jacques Cousteau, visits a group of local doctors who claim to have found the location of the Trompeuse. Cousteau even gains permission to film on the wreck site.

== See also ==
- Henry Morgan, famed buccaneer who had used Île-à-Vache as a base and hideout before Hamlin.
