= Anne Dieu-le-Veut =

French pirate (1661–1710)

Anne Dieu-Le-Veut
- Born: 28 August 1661; Province of Brittany, France
- Died: 11 January 1710 (aged 48) possibly Santo Domingo
- Other names: Marie-Anne, Marianne
- Occupation: Pirate
- Spouses: Pierre Lelong (m. 1684; died 1690) Joseph Cherel (m. 1691; died 1693) Laurens de Graaf (m. 1693; died 1704)
- Children: 4 (1 each with Lelong and Cherel, 2 with de Graaf)

Anne "Dieu-Le-Veut" de Graaf also called Marie-Anne or Marianne (28 August 1661 – 11 January 1710) was a French pirate. Alongside Jacquotte Delahaye, she was one of very few female buccaneers. While Delahaye was likely fictional, Dieu-le-Veut was real; however, many of her exploits are inventions of later writers.

== Background ==
Anne was originally from the province of Brittany, France.

She was possibly deported to French Tortuga as a criminal. She reportedly arrived on Tortuga during the reign of Bertrand d'Ogeron de la Bouëre, who was governor of the island in 1665-1668 and 1669–1675. In 1684, she married buccaneer Pierre Lelong, who was killed in a fight on 15 July 1690. With him, she had one child, Marie Marguerite Yvonne Lelong (1688-1774). In 1691, she married Joseph Cherel, who in turn died in June 1693. She had another child, Jean-François Chérel (1692-1732), with him.

In March 1693, she met the famous buccaneer Laurens de Graaf. He agreed to marry her after she threatened to shoot him for insulting her. (Note: According to Vaissière, the two were married in 1693 and their daughter was recorded as twelve years old in 1704.) According to the traditional description of the event, Anne challenged de Graaf to a duel to avenge the death of her late spouse. While Laurens drew his sword, Anne drew her gun, after which Laurens succumbed by saying he would not fight a female. He then proposed to her in admiration of her courage. Anne and Laurens de Graaf married 28 July 1693. They had two children, a daughter, Marie Catherine de Graaf (1694-1743) and a son who died as a child (1700-1705).

== "Godless Anne" ==
Anne Dieu-Le-Veut is known as a pirate, supposedly accompanying her husband Laurens de Graaf on his acts of piracy. Usually, it was considered bad luck to have a woman on board a ship, but Anne was instead regarded as a good luck charm. The couple were captured by Spain and kept as hostages for three years, despite attempts made by France to release them.

In 1698, Anne was released and reunited with her spouse. Her later life, as well as that of Laurens de Graaf, is not well recorded, though their death dates are known. According to some legends, they eventually settled in Louisiana. de Graaf died in 1704 in Santo Domingo, and Dieu-le-Veut followed in 1710.

== Legend and reality ==
There were several stories and legends concerning Anne.

There is one legend depicting Anne becoming a widow. As Anne and Laurens attacked a Spanish ship, a cannonball took the life of Laurens. Anne took his place as commander of his ship, as she had done before, hurled their crew of pirates on with fury in the fight against the Spaniards. However, the pirates were outnumbered, and they were all captured and taken first to Veracruz in Mexico, and then to Cartagena in Colombia, both of which were cities earlier sacked by Laurens, to be judged. Anne's fame was so great that when the French Marine Secretary of Pontchartrain heard of this, he wrote to Louis XIV of France and asked him to make the king of Spain intervene. Anne was then freed as a special service between kings, and she was never heard of again.

This story is not confirmed. If Laurens and Anne settled in Louisiana after 1698 as have been suggested, it would not have prevented them from continuing their career of piracy. If historical, it would have happened in 1704, which was the year of Laurens' death. As Tortuga was closed as a pirate base in 1697, Mississippi would have been a better base for such activity, and piracy toward Spain could have been supported by the French crown the Spanish War of Succession in 1700–1714. If so, an intervention by an official from Pontchartrain in French Louisiana would not have been illogical. As one of the rivaling Spanish kings during that period was a French prince, it would have made it easy to receive a Spanish royal pardon by way of the French monarch.

Period sources show that de Graaf and Dieu-le-Veut were married, but they do not mention her sailing with de Graaf or accompanying him on his buccaneering raids, which were behind him by the time they were married.
