= Isla de Sacrificios =

Island in Mexico

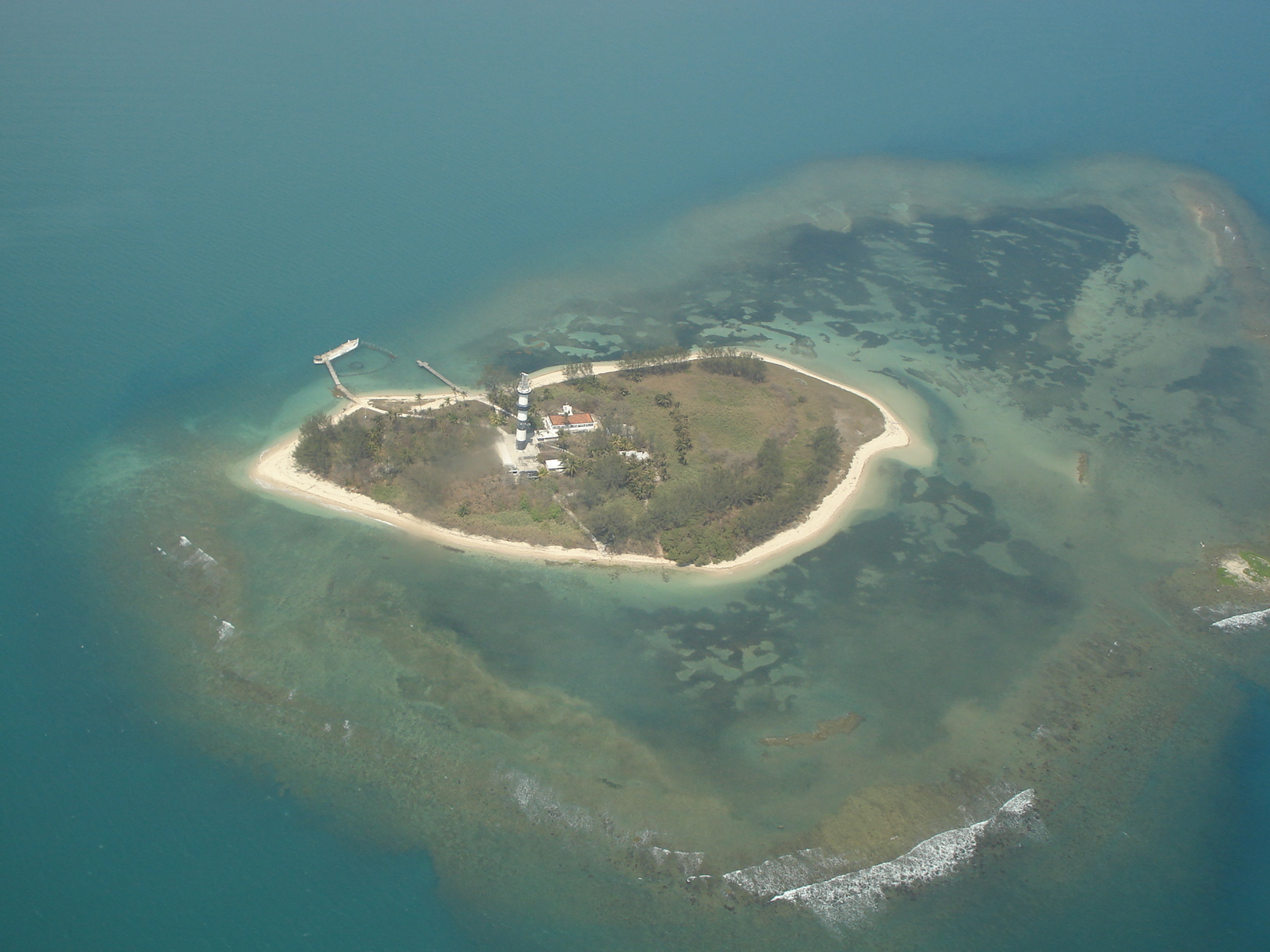

- Location within Mexico

Geography
- Location: Gulf coastline
- Coordinates: 19.1751°N 96.0921°W
- Total islands: 1

Administration
- Mexico
- State: Veracruz
- County: Sistema Arrecifal Veracruzano
- Governing body: Secretariat of the Navy

Isla de Sacrificios ("Island of Sacrifices") is an island in the Gulf of Mexico, situated off the Gulf coastline near the port of Veracruz, in Mexico. The waters surrounding the island are part of the Sistema Arrecifal Veracruzano National Marine Park. It is currently closed to the public and is under the protection of the Secretariat of the Navy.

== Spanish discovery ==
The island received its name when it was charted by the expedition in 1518 under Juan de Grijalva, the first Spanish expedition to reconnoitre this section of the Gulf Coast. According to the account of Bernal Díaz, a member of the expedition whose Historia verdadera de la conquista de la Nueva España famously recalls the exploits of the conquistadores on this and the succeeding venture led by Hernán Cortés, after landing on the island:

We found two stone buildings of good workmanship, each with a flight of steps leading up to a kind of altar, and on those altars were evil-looking idols, which were their gods. Here we found five Indians who had been sacrificed to them on that very night. Their chests had been struck open and their arms and thighs cut off, and the walls of these buildings were covered in blood. All this amazed us greatly, and we called this island the Isla de Sacrificios, as it is now named on the charts.

== Use by pirates ==
In 1683, Laurens de Graaf and Nicholas van Hoorn retreated to the island after their attack on Veracruz. Once on the island, Van Hoorn became impatient at delays in receiving ransom payments. He ordered a dozen Spanish prisoners executed and had their heads delivered to Veracruz as a sign of his displeasure. De Graaf was furious and the two quarrelled and then fought a duel during which Van Hoorn received a minor injury to his wrist. The wound turned gangrenous and Van Hoorn died shortly thereafter.

== Later visits ==
In 1823, when the island was visited by the antiquities collector, William Bullock, he found it to be a "mere heap of sand" and uninhabited, save for "only one wretched Indian family living on it". Some ruins of pre-Columbian buildings were still visible. Bullock also noted the island to be:

...strewed [sic] with the bones of British subjects who have perished in this unhealthy climate, and whose remains are not allowed to be buried in consecrated ground.

Many finds from the island can now be seen in the British Museum.

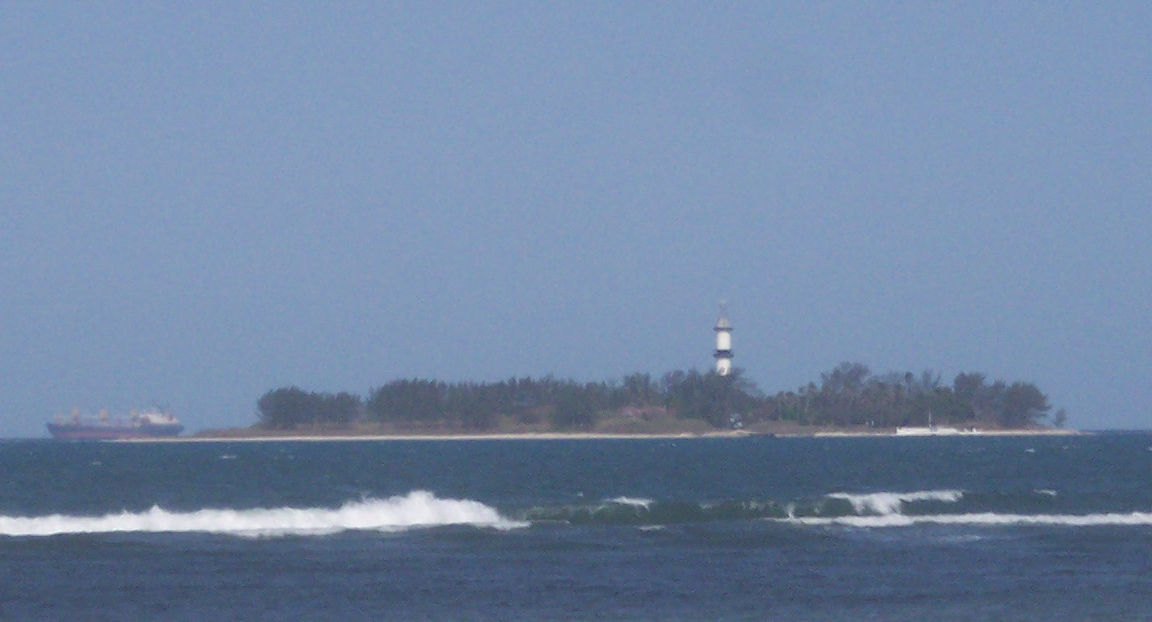

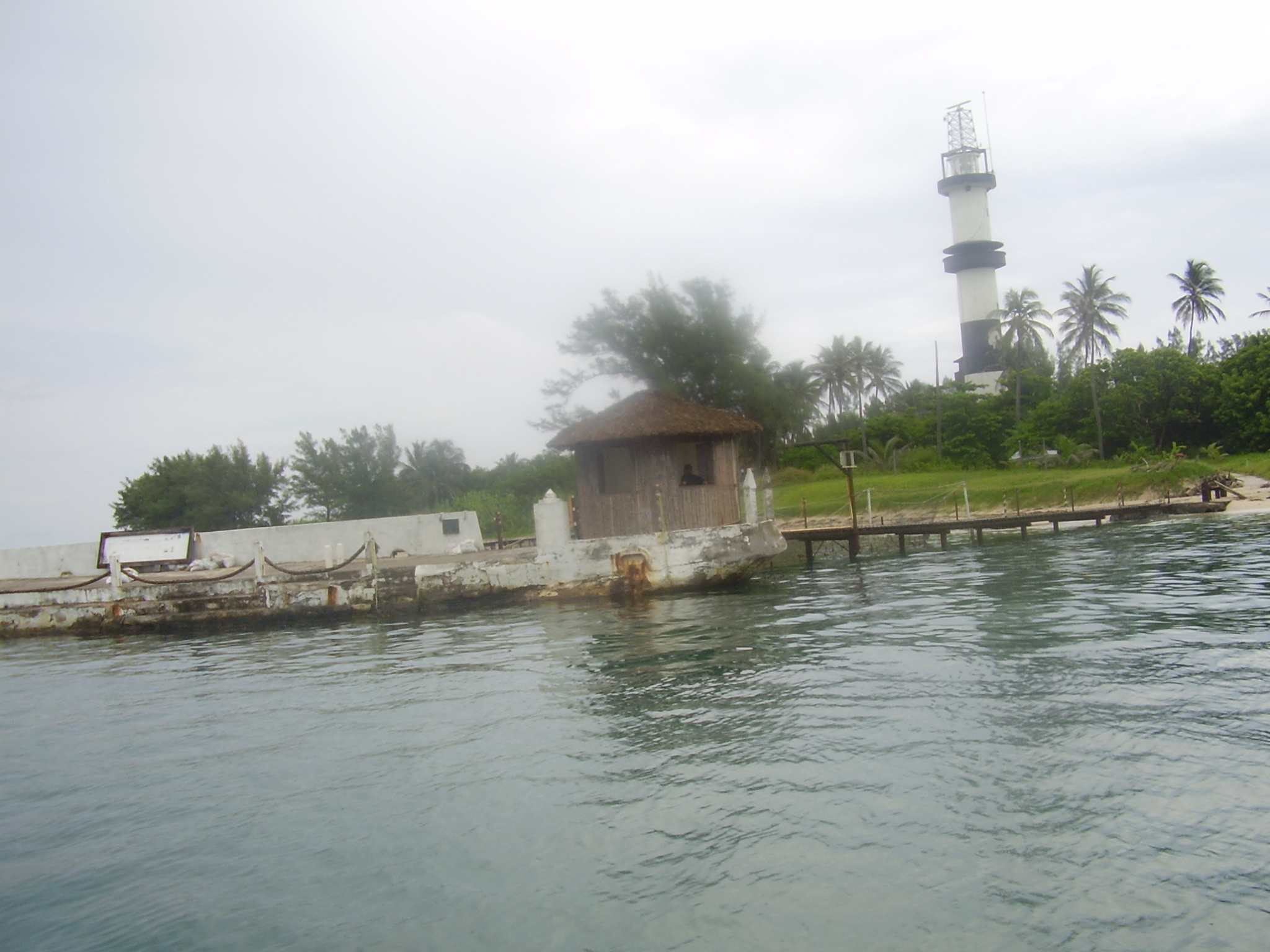

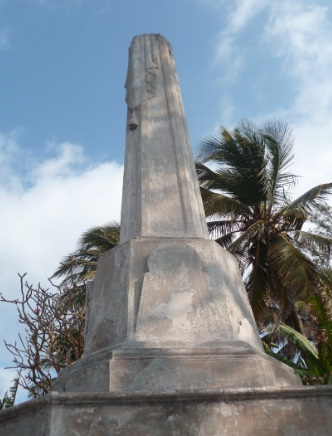
Monument text "REPUBLIQUE FRANÇAISE. 1893. A LA MÉMOIRE DES OFFICIERS, MARINS ET SOLDATS FRANÇAIS INHUMÉS DANS L'ILE DE SACRIFICIOS. 1838.-1867."

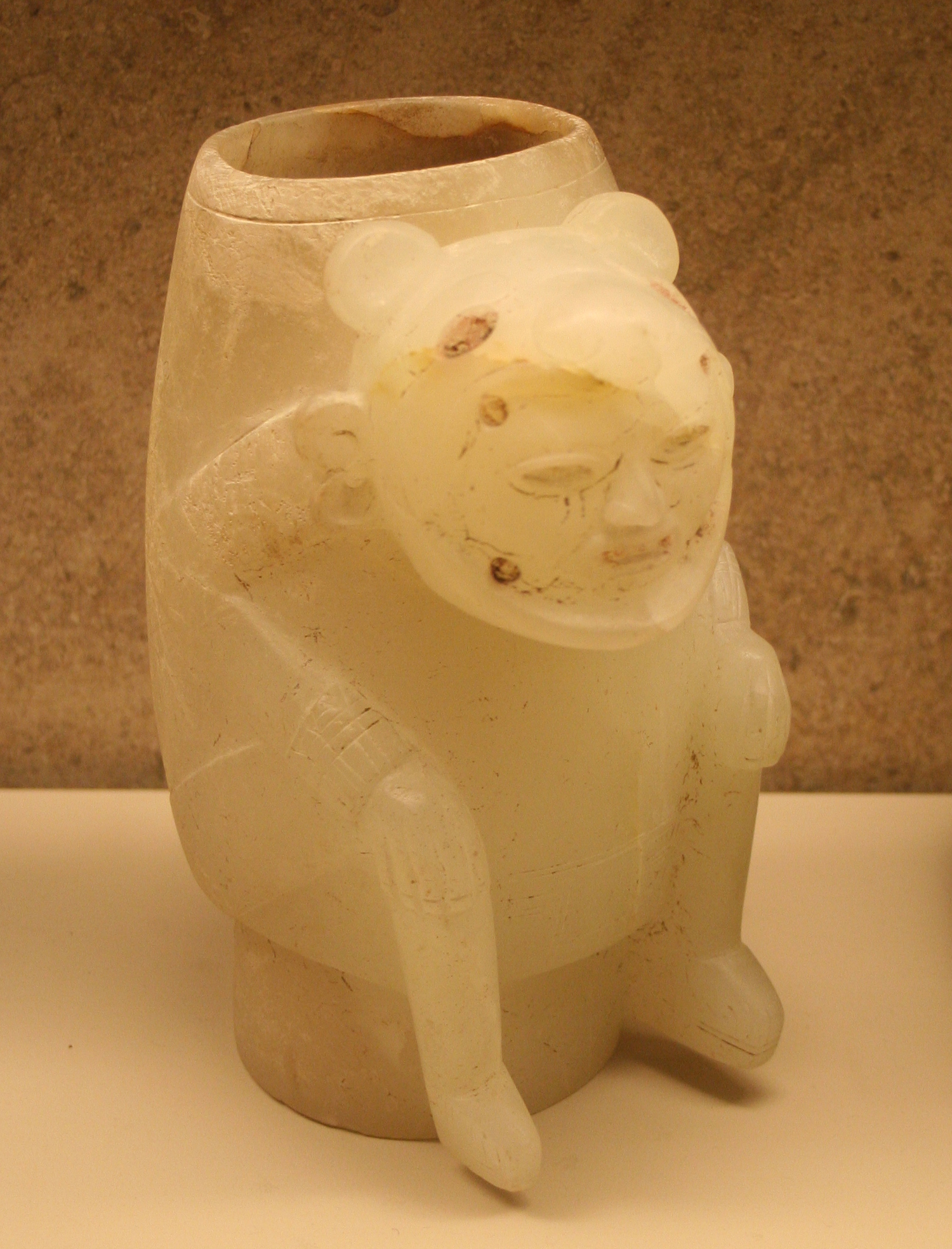
Alabaster vessel found on the island (British Museum)
