= Attack on Veracruz =

1683 raid against Veracruz by Dutch pirates

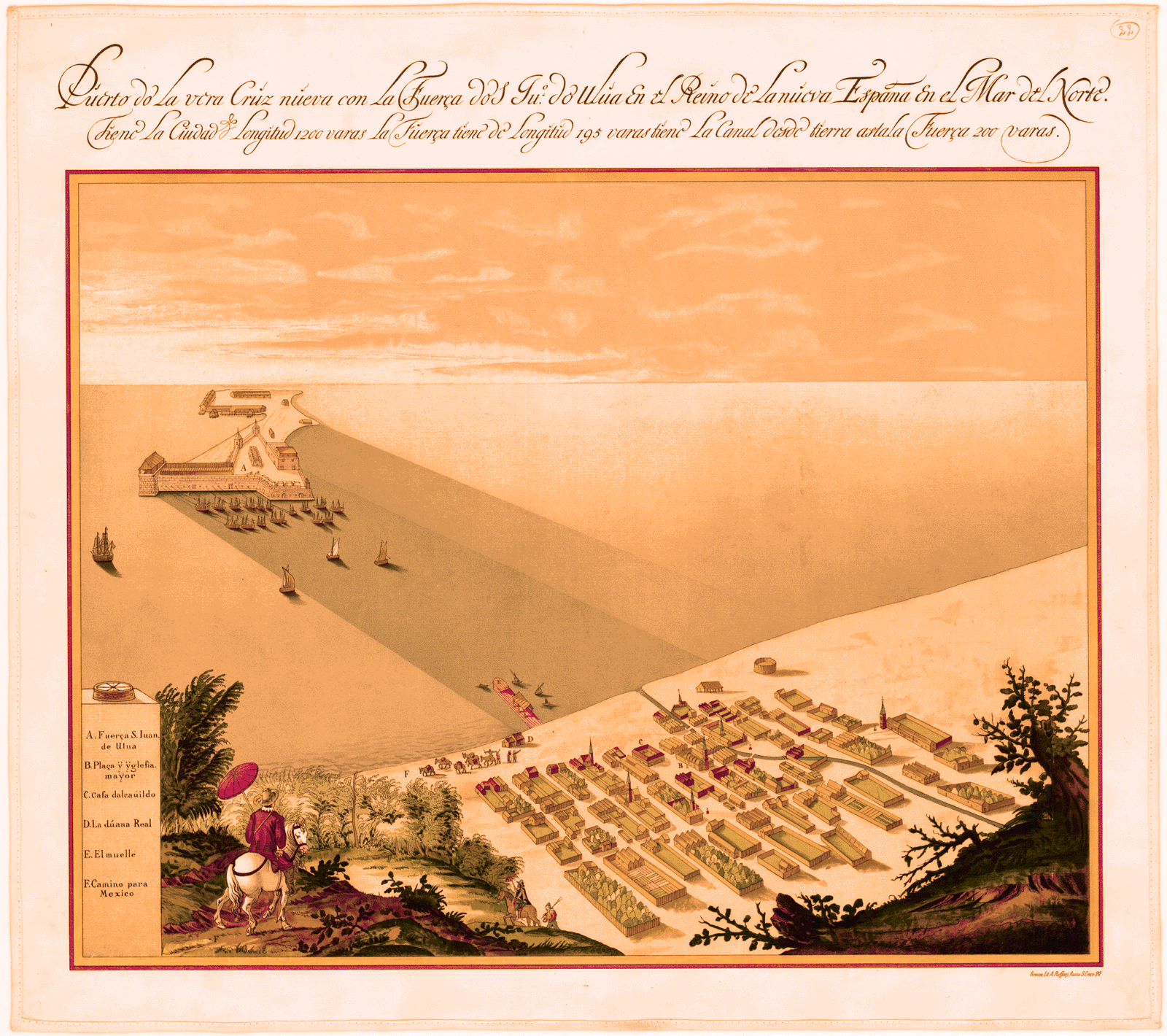
Veracruz in the 17th century.

The attack on Veracruz was a 1683 raid against the port of Veracruz, in the Viceroyalty of New Spain (viceregal Mexico). It was led by the Dutch pirates Laurens de Graaf, Nicholas van Hoorn, and Michel de Grammont.

== History ==
On 17 May 1683, the pirates arrived off the coast of Veracruz with a small fleet which included five large vessels, eight smaller vessels and around 1,300 pirates. At the head of the fleet sailed two Spanish warships, previously captured by van Hoorn, designed to confuse the townsfolk into thinking the fleet was Spanish.

While the fleet was anchored offshore, de Graaf and Yankey Willems were landed some distance from the town and waited until early the following morning. While most of the town's militia were sleeping, the men disabled the town's fortifications and allowed van Hoorn and a large force of pirates, who had marched overland, to enter the city and neutralise the remaining defences. The pirates sacked the town and took many hostages including the town's governor.

On the second day of plundering, the Spanish treasure fleet, composed of numerous warships, appeared on the horizon. The pirates retreated with hostages to the nearby Isla de Sacrificios and waited for ransoms. Impatient that payments did not arrive immediately, Van Hoorn ordered the execution of a dozen prisoners and had their heads sent to Veracruz as a warning. De Graaf was furious; the two argued and then fought a duel. Van Hoorn received a slash across the wrist and was returned to his ship in shackles. The wound soon turned gangrenous and Van Hoorn died shortly thereafter. Finally, giving up on further plunder, the pirates departed, slipping past the Spanish without hindrance.

== See also ==
- Battle of Veracruz, one of a number of 19th-century conflicts centred on the same town.
