= Michel de Grammont =

French buccaneer

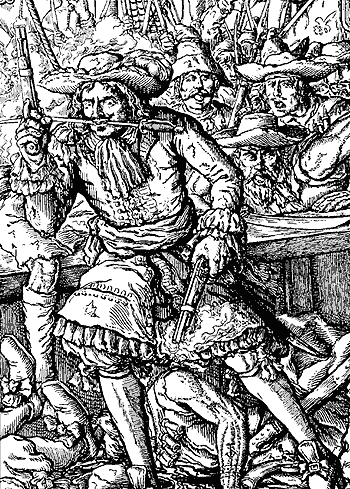
- Born: c. 1645; Paris, Kingdom of France
- Died: April 1686 near St. Augustine, Florida
- Piratical career
- Nickname: Chevalier de Grammont
- Type: Buccaneer
- Allegiance: France
- Years active: c. 1670 - 1686
- Rank: Admiral
- Base of operations: Caribbean
- Commands: Hardi

Michel de Grammont (c. 1645 – 1686?) was a French privateer. He was born in Paris, France and was lost at sea in the north-east Caribbean, April 1686. His privateer career lasted from around 1670 to 1686 during which he commanded the flagship Hardi. He primarily attacked Spanish holdings in Maracaibo, Gibraltar, Trujillo, La Guaira, Puerto Cabello, Cumana and Veracruz.

== Biography ==
Chevalier de Grammont was a nobleman who came into disfavour after killing his sister's suitor in a duel. Forced to leave France, he went to Hispaniola where he was given a French ship and served as a privateer. His first success was the capture of a Dutch convoy, valued at about 400,000 livres (US$4 million). On his next voyage he ran on a reef and sank. Grammont moved to Tortuga where he bought and outfitted a new ship which he used to attack Spanish shipping. When the Franco-Dutch War broke out between France and the Dutch Republic in 1672, he joined a fleet under the command of Comte d'Estrées for an abortive raid on the Dutch island of Curaçao; however, the entire fleet of 17 vessels was wrecked on the Las Aves Archipelago.

In June 1678 he was made commander of the six ships and 700 men salvaged from the Las Aves disaster. De Grammont landed his men in Spanish-held Venezuela and captured Maracaibo, as well as several smaller towns including Gibraltar, penetrating as far inland as Trujillo. For the next six months the pirates plundered the entire region.

Maracaibo, Cabimas, Ciudad Ojeda y Gibraltar

On February 22, 1679, he decided to make an incursion on the inland settlement of Puerto Principe, now Camaguey city, in Cuba. At dawn on the next day, Grammont was a few leagues from the town, as he led his 600 men, they were spotted in the early morning mist by Prebyster Francisco Garcerán, who was at that time on the road, immediately he turned around and at full gallop returned to town, he went to the main church and rung the bells to alert everyone of the approaching danger, the inhabitants took all their valuables away, so Grammont and his men were not able to get much plunder, and to make matters worse, on the way back to the ships on the coast, his forces were ambushed and they had to fight their way out, suffering heavy casualties, but managed to get away with the rest of his men and sailed away.

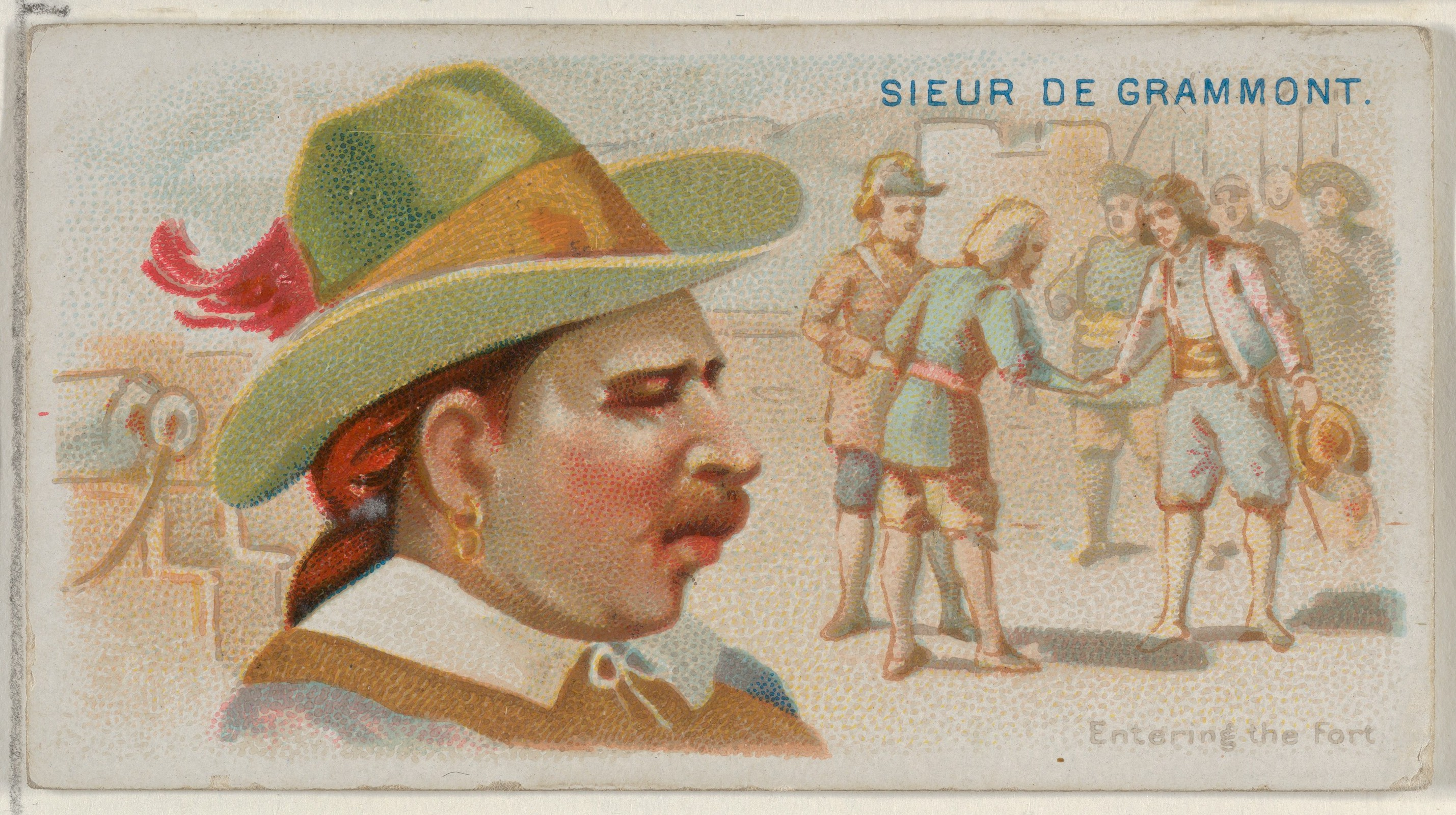
Sieur de Grammont, Entering the Fort, from the Pirates of the Spanish Main series (N19) for Allen & Ginter Cigarettes MET DP835014

In May 1680, de Grammont joined forces with William Wright at Blanquilla Island. Their target was La Guaria, the port of Caracas. Of his 180 followers only forty-seven took part in the actual seizure of the town, which was amply protected by two forts and by cannon upon the walls. On the following day, however, he received word that 2000 men were approaching from Caracas, and as the enemy were also rallying in force in the vicinity of the town he was compelled to retire to the ships. This movement was executed with difficulty, and for two hours de Grammont with a handful of his bravest companions covered the embarkation from the assaults of the Spaniards. Although he himself was dangerously wounded in the throat, he lost only eight or nine men in the whole action. He carried away with him the Governor of La Guayra and many other prisoners, but the booty was small. De Grammont retired to the Isle d'Aves to nurse his wound, and after a long convalescence returned to Petit Goave.

Following his recovery, de Grammont commanded eight ships but had no success until 1682 when, at the request of the governor of Petit-Goâve (actual Haiti), he joined Nicholas van Hoorn to harass Spanish shipping. During this period they attacked ships which unknown to them belonged to the Dutch pirate Laurens de Graaf. On meeting de Graaf on Bonaco Island they asked him to join them. De Graaf initially refused but later agreed.

On May 17, 1683, de Grammont, van Hoorn, Yankey Willems, Jacob Evertson, Jean Tristan, de Graaf, and several others sacked Veracruz in Mexico, taking 4,000 prisoners for ransom. Using two captured Spanish galleons in the vanguard, Yankey Willems and Laurens de Graaf were able to sneak into the Spanish harbor during the early morning hours and landed a small force on shore. The buccaneers caught the garrison off guard, many of the soldiers still sleeping, and took out the city's defenses allowing the rest of the fleet to enter the harbor. After three or four days, Willems and the others looted the town before retreating at the sight of the New Spain fleet. Ultimately, the buccaneers were responsible for the abduction of over 1,400 people of African descent, most of whom were taken to French Saint-Domingue (Haiti) and the English Carolina colony. Later Grammont raided Spanish Florida settlements, including St.Augustine and the Mocama mission province, forcing further southward migrations.

In July 1685, de Grammont and de Graaf sacked the Mexican city of Campeche: however, after two months of plundering the city with little result, de Grammont sent a demand for ransom to the governor, who refused. De Grammont then commenced to execute prisoners as retaliation, but de Graaf stopped the executions and de Grammont parted company from his allies.

De Grammont was last seen in April 1686 heading northeast to sail off of St. Augustine, Florida, planning a raid alongside French buccaneer Nicolas Brigaut. Spanish soldiers captured and executed Brigaut when his ship was grounded near Matanzas Inlet as Brigaut waited for Grammont to rescue him and his sailors. The rescue never came: Grammont's ship was caught in the same storm that wrecked Brigaut's vessel and was lost with all hands.

== See also ==
- List of people who disappeared mysteriously at sea

== Books ==
- Pickering, David (2006) Pirates. CollinsGem. HarperCollins Publishers, New York, NY. pp-59.
- Novikov, Serhii (2026). The Shipyard of FATE. Captain de Grammont. NGO Writers' Creative Association, Kyiv. ISBN 978-617-95635-0-8
