= Île-à-Vache =

Île-à-Vache Lilavach
- Island
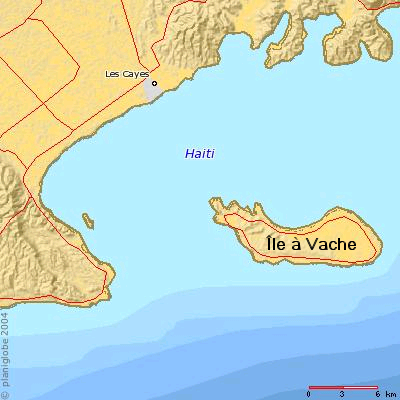
- Île-à-Vache and the coast of southwestern Haiti

- Location within Haiti Location within the Caribbean
- Coordinates: 18°04′15″N 73°38′30″W
- Country: Haiti
- Department: Sud

Area
  - Total: 51.79 km^{2} (20.00 sq mi)

Population
  - Total: 15,000
  - Density: 288.46/km^{2} (747.1/sq mi)

Île-à-Vache, (French, pronounced [il a vaʃ], also expressed Île-à-Vaches, former Spanish name Isla Vaca; both translate to Cow Island; Haitian Creole: Lilavach) is a Caribbean island, one of Haiti's satellite islands. It lies in the Baie de Cayes about 6.5 miles (10.5 km) off the coast of the country's southwest peninsula, roughly between the town of Les Cayes and Pointe l'Abacou. It was formerly known by the name of Abacca. Administratively, it became a commune in 1976 as part of the Les Cayes Arrondissement in the Sud department.

Île-à-Vache was claimed by the Spanish Empire in 1492 as part of Hispaniola, and for the next two centuries it was known by the name Isla Vaca. In 1697 the island of Hispaniola was formally divided between Spain and France in the Treaty of Ryswick which ended the Nine Years War. France assumed control of the western half of Hispaniola and named it Saint-Domingue, and Isla Vaca took on its current name, Île-à-Vache.

== Geography ==
The island is about 8 miles (13 km) long and 2 miles (3.2 km) wide, with an area of 20 square miles (52 km^{2}). The western end of the island has rolling hills with elevations as high as 490 feet (150 m) with several small swamps in the valleys; the eastern side of the island is swampy, and contains a lagoon with one of the largest mangrove forests in Haiti. The island is also surrounded by several dangerous shoals, reefs, and rocks that have been the cause of many shipwrecks throughout history, including that of the famous Canadian fishing and racing schooner Bluenose, which was wrecked on the island in 1946.

== Demographics ==
The population of the island in 2015 was 14,004 adult inhabitants. Île-à-Vache is one of the most popular tourist sites in Haiti. There are two tourist resorts on the island, Port Morgan and Abaka Bay.

== History ==
=== Henry Morgan ===
The pirate captain Henry Morgan (c. 1635 – 1688) frequently used the little island as a base for his operations. Morgan planned and staged many of his largest raids from Isla Vaca, and lost multiple ships in the island's waters which have recently been found and explored by research divers.

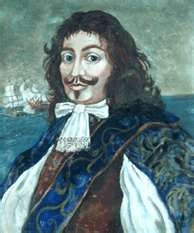
Captain Henry Morgan.

In January 1669, Morgan brought ten ships and 800 men to Isla Vaca as a rendezvous point before launching a raid on the Spanish city of Cartagena. Because he and his fellow buccaneers had just captured two French warships, they decided to celebrate in the easily accessible Ferret Bay on the northwest side of the island. They made a fire to roast several pigs and fired the cannons of their flagship as was typical for a buccaneer celebration. In the midst of their drunken revelry, the ship's gunpowder magazine was accidentally lit, triggering an explosion that blew up Morgan's flagship HMS Oxford. In the explosion, Morgan, who was on board the ship, was thrown through the window of his quarters and into the sea. He survived the accident, but the Oxford sank, taking down with it the two captured French warships (which were tied to it) and about 200 of his men.

The ship, which was only 4 metres (13 ft) below the water's surface, was found in 2004 by a team of researchers. They were accompanied by a team from the Welsh television channel S4C, which has made a documentary of the discovery. If there is still spoil located on board, is not yet known.

In 1675–1676 he again narrowly survived a costly shipwreck on the island's shores. Morgan had been appointed Lieutenant Governor of Jamaica and was on his way from England to take up the post. He possibly headed for Isla Vaca to salvage what he could from the sunken ships of the 1669 incident. But a storm arose and sank his ship Jamaica Merchant, which was loaded with a full complement of cannon which he had been bringing to bolster the defenses at Port Royal. This ship has been found by researchers, who have recovered dishes, bronze coins, and the ship's anchor.

The current tourist resort of Port Morgan is named after him.

From 1682 to 1684 French pirate Jean Hamlin used the island as his hideout while plundering English and Dutch ships.

=== Bernard Kock ===
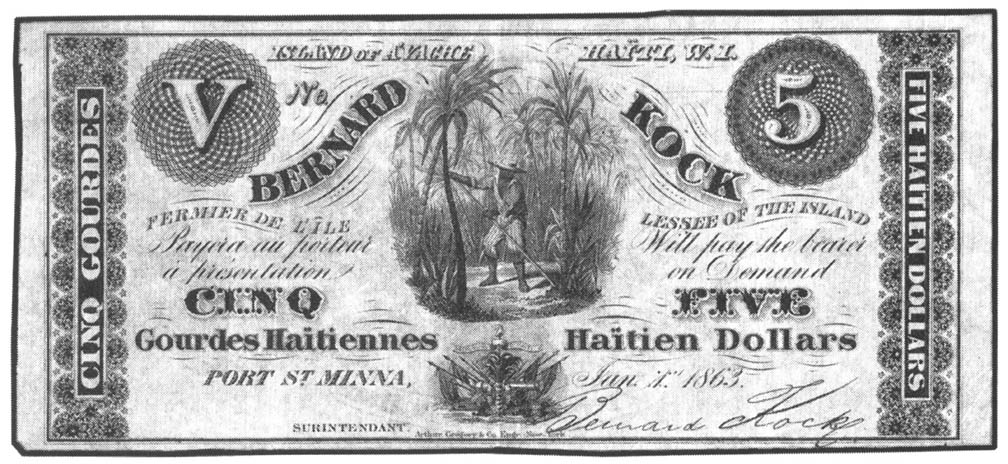
Bernard Kock 5 Haitian dollar note

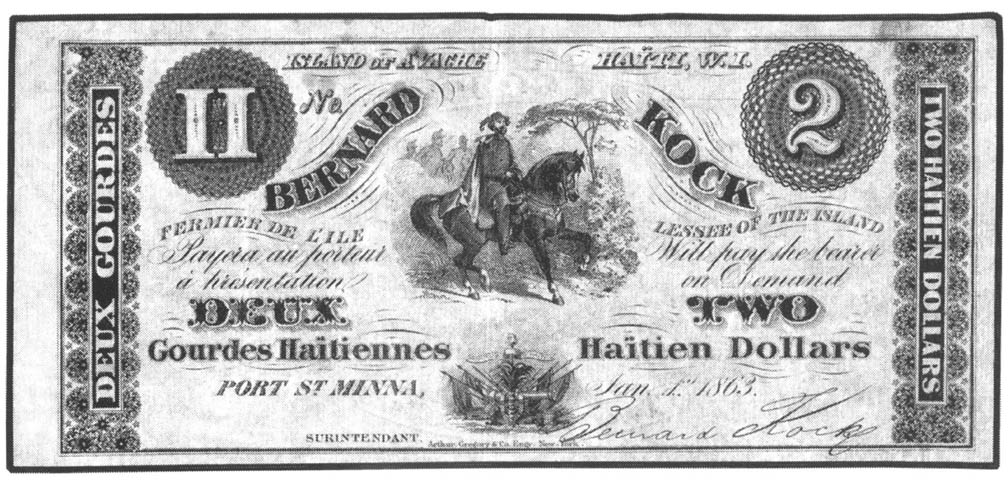
Bernard Kock 2 Haitian dollar note

In 1862 the entrepreneur Bernard Kock, who owned a Florida cotton plantation, visited the World Fair in London. When he saw two bales of cotton from Haiti, he was impressed by the quality and immediately saw a business opportunity. He conceived a plan to develop Île-à-Vache by sending 5,000 emancipated slaves from the United States to grow cotton there.

He left for Haiti on May 17, 1862, and arrived in Jacmel on June 3. From there he went on horseback to Port-au-Prince, where he was warmly received by the president of the country, Fabre Geffrard. The negotiations were difficult. The president supported the arrival of more blacks to the country, but he was also reluctant to rent a piece of Haitian soil to a white man. Kock managed to sign a contract on August 8 which granted him a 10 year lease of Île-à-Vache, with the right to an extension of a further 10 years. The rent was 3.5 gourdes (about $0.35) per hectare. He had to start operations within six months and a number of employee supervisors had to be black. They would be immediately naturalized as Haitians upon arrival. Kock was to provide a percentage of all the wood that he chopped on the island, as a kind of tax. The contract also guaranteed that he would protect the Haitian state, and that he would not have to pay import duties on the supplies that he imported.

During the same period, the United States was embroiled in the American Civil War and President Abraham Lincoln, who was in favor of the abolition of slavery, was considering plans to establish colonies of emancipated slaves in countries like New Granada and Liberia. He even offered $50 to anyone who took a black person abroad and gave him a job there.

Kock left on August 14 for New York, and arrived on August 28. American Secretary of State William H. Seward received many complaints from Central American governments who saw no advantage in the advent of so many blacks to their region. In light of these complaints, Seward stalled Kock's plan.

So Kock went directly to President Lincoln. Lincoln had his doubts about Kock's sincerity at first. He suspected that Kock was only after the $50 per person which had been promised. On December 31, the President promised that he would think about his plan, but the next day later, Lincoln signed the Emancipation Proclamation, which contained not a single word about this or any other colonial plan.

Disappointed, Kock moved to Washington where he managed to find some blacks who were interested in going to Haiti. Back in New York, he found three financiers who pledged $70,000 to his venture. On the basis of this pledge, Kock chartered the British ship the Ocean Ranger and with this ship he brought 500 people to Île-à-Vache on April 13, 1863. Some of his passengers became ill from smallpox while on board, forcing Kock to found a small emergency hospital upon arrival.

Kock settled with laborers on a 4-year contract for a wage of $0.16 per day, costs included. He printed special Gourde notes, upon which was the text Island of A'Vache [sic] and his name, Bernard Kock. These were exchangeable for normal Haitian gourdes.

The financiers, however, did not fulfill their promise. They paid the initial amount, partly in hopes of reaping the promised $50 per person. This reward remained in effect because the government continued to doubt Kock's good intentions. After the reward was received, the financiers sent scarcely any more money or supplies to the island. The workers rebelled, and Kock called in 15 Haitian soldiers to control the situation. In addition, the financiers made increasing demands, which Kock could not meet without money and goods.

Ultimately, the contract was broken. On December 22, 1863, President Lincoln sent a ship to Haiti to bring the remaining 453 workers back to the United States.

=== Current events ===
One of the most notable foreign-born personalities on Île-à-Vache was Père Margon, a Franciscan priest deeply beloved by the local peasant population. Père Margon was a staunch advocate for healthy living and played a significant role in the education of many youths on the island. He served as the head of a free elementary school in Cakok, which was managed by Sister Flora, a fellow Franciscan nun. Additionally, Père Margon established a trade school near Madame Bernard, further contributing to the development of the community. Another beloved personality was Sr. Flora, a French-Canadian Franciscan nun founded an orphanage and school which she has run for decades in the village of Madame Bernard.

==== Île-à-Vache Initiative ====
The Haitian government announced plans to begin an international tourist destination project on the island of Île-à-Vache in 2013. The government’s projects on the island launched with plans for 1,000 luxury hotel rooms, an archaeology museum, nightclubs, art galleries and craft boutiques. Development commenced in 2013 and was initially projected to be complete in 2015, making Île-à-Vache among the largest ongoing tourism projects in the Caribbean.

The government built a 2.6-kilometre runway with plans for an international airport. As of February 2014, the Haitian government had begun the process of expropriation and relocation. This has resulted in backlash from some island residents who are opposed to the project. The way in which the project was carried out has also resulted in general protests and the creation of the Organisation of Ile à Vache Farmers (Konbit Peyizan Ilavach, or KOPI), which aims to negotiate with the government on behalf of the population. The documentary "Exploiting Eden: Île-a-Vache" (Gomez-Rosado, 2023) is an account of this process, as is the PhD thesis Une analyse sociohistorique de la résistance paysanne de l’Ile-à-Vache (Haïti) face au projet de développement (éco) touristique de l’État (Osna, 2023). As of August 2022, the master development contract for the island is held by WatersMark, a U.S.-based firm. WatersMark describes its Île-à-Vache Initiative as being "to Haiti what Disney World is to Orlando".
