= Thomas Lynch (governor) =

Governor of Jamaica

Sir Thomas Lynch (died 1684) was the English governor of Jamaica on three occasions in the 17th century (1663–1664, August 1671–November 1674, and lastly 1682–1684). He was also chief justice of Jamaica for a time.

== Life ==
He was the son of Theophilus Lynch Esq of Rixton Hall in Lancashire (born 1603), fourth son of William Lynch Esq of Cranbrook in Kent, and of his wife Judith, eldest daughter of Royal chaplain and Bishop of London John Aylmer. He served under Robert Venables in the army which went out to Jamaica in 1655. In January 1661, after a period back in England he was appointed provost-marshal of the island for life.

In December 1662 Lynch was lieutenant-colonel of the 5th regiment of militia; in April 1663 was sworn in as a member of council, and in April 1664 elected president of the council in the absence of Sir Charles Lyttelton. In June 1664 Sir Thomas Modyford became governor, and Lynch was again sworn of the council. Shortly Modyford wrote to his brother, Sir James Modyford, then in England, asking him to get the Duke of Albemarle to appoint a sheriff, instead of a provost-marshal; but on 12 February 1665 Lynch wrote to Lord Arlington complaining that the governor had discharged him from the council and the office of chief justice without giving any public reason.

Lynch was then obliged to return to England. At the end of 1670 he was ordered to go out again to Jamaica, as lieutenant-governor, with authority to command in the absence of Modyford. The commission was repeated in January 1671, when Modyford was recalled, and at the same time he received a commission from James, Duke of York to be commander-in-chief of his majesty's ships in and about Jamaica. He was knighted at Whitehall Palace on 3 December 1670. Lynch was criticized by his superiors in England for his conduct during the trial of pirate Peter Johnson; when the pirate was acquitted, Lynch ordered him re-tried and personally directed the trial, convicting and executing Johnson.

Jamaica's buccaneers had been encouraged by Modyford. Under Lynch they acted under the governor's commission, including Henry Morgan; and the king claimed his share of the Spanish plunder. Diplomatic complaints from the Spanish government, however, compelled the English government to give way. Lynch was recalled, apparently in 1676, and Lord Vaughan was sent out with orders to suppress the pirates and put an end to piracy. In 1682 Lynch was again sent out to Jamaica as governor and captain-general, with similar instructions regarding piracy, and these he carried out severely. Among his targets was French pirate Jean Hamlin, who was repeatedly protected by St. Thomas' Governor Adolph Esmit.

Under Lynch and Morgan, the colonial authorities tried in vain to defeat the Jamaican Maroons of Juan de Serras, but the Maroons just withdrew further into the Blue Mountains, out of the reach of the colonial militias.

Lynch died, apparently in 1684, some time before the death of Charles II was known in the colony. Already ill, Lynch was incensed at captured pirate Joseph Bannister having evaded conviction on legal technicalities and died immediately after the infuriating and unsuccessful trial. He was buried in the cathedral of Jamaica, beneath a black marble slab.

== Family ==
Lynch married firstly, Vere, daughter of Sir George Herbert (incorrect. Vere was daughter of Sir Edward Herbert (1591-1658), Attorney General to King Charles I, went into exile to join Charles II, died in exile in poverty)

by whom he had a daughter Philadelphia, wife of Sir Thomas Cotton of the Cotton baronets of Combermere. He married secondly, Mary, daughter of Thomas Temple of Frankton in Warwickshire, but does not seem to have left any children. His widow afterwards married his successor, Colonel Hender Molesworth.[1]

== Notes ==
Attribution

This article incorporates text from a publication now in the public domain: "Lynch, Thomas (d.1684?)". Dictionary of National Biography. London: Smith, Elder & Co. 1885–1900.

Government offices
Preceded by Charles Lyttelton	Deputy Governor of Jamaica acting 1663–1664	Succeeded by Edward Morgan
Preceded by Thomas Modyford	Lieutenant Governor of Jamaica; August 1671 – November 1674	Succeeded by Henry Morgan
Preceded by Henry Morgan	Lieutenant Governor of Jamaica; 1682ֱ–1684	Succeeded by Hender Molesworth
