= Laurens de Graaf =

Dutch pirate

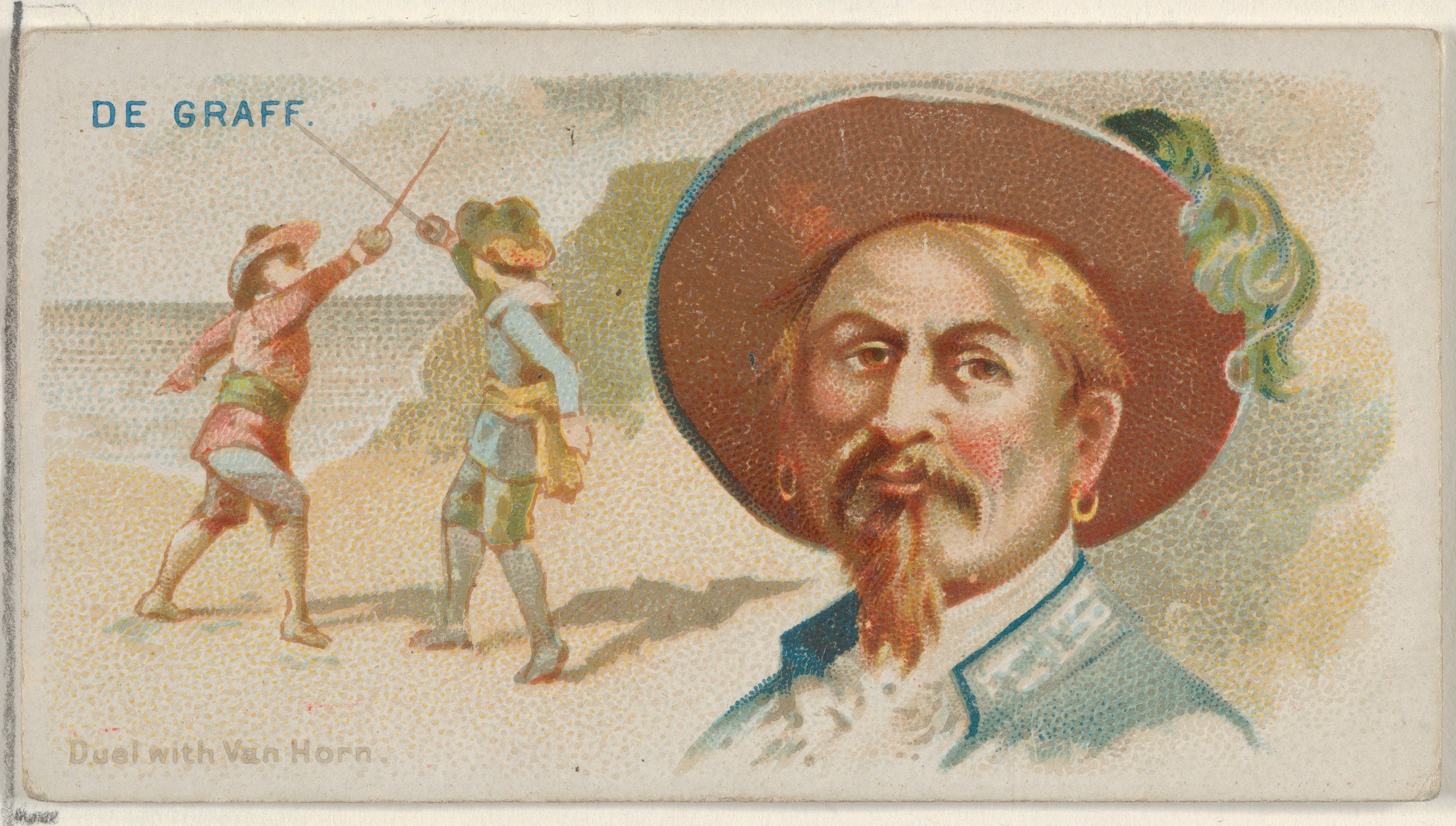
- A cigarette card depicting De Graaf's duel with Van Horn
- Born: Laurens Cornelis Boudewijn de Graaf c. 1653; Dordrecht, Holland, Dutch Republic
- Died: 24 May 1704 (aged c. 51) possibly Santo Domingo
- Occupations: Pirate, mercenary
- Spouses: Francois Petronilla de Guzman (m. 1674) Anne Dieu-le-Veut (m. 1693)
- Children: 2 (with Dieu-le-Veut)

Laurens Cornelis Boudewijn de Graaf (c. 1653 – 24 May 1704) was a Dutch pirate, mercenary, and naval officer in the service of the French colony of Saint-Domingue during the late 17th and early 18th century.

De Graaf was also known as Laurencillo or Lorencillo or simply El Griffe (Spanish), Sieur de Baldran or simply Laurent de Graff (French) and Gesel van de West (Dutch; "Scourge of the West"). Henry Morgan, the governor of Jamaica, characterized him as "a great and mischievous pirate". De Graaf was described as tall, blond, mustached and handsome. Some Spanish thought he was the Devil in person.

== Early life ==
He was reportedly enslaved by Spanish slave traders when captured in what is now the Netherlands and transported to the Canary Islands to work on a plantation, prior to 1674.

During the early 1670s, de Graaf either escaped or was freed, and French historian Pierre de Vaissière recorded that he married his first wife (Francois) Petronilla de Guzmán in 1674 in the Canary Islands before moving on to the Caribbean. The Spanish governor of St. Augustine, Florida attested to his marriage in a letter written to Charles II of Spain in 1682, by referring to de Graaf as a "stranger who was married in the Canaries".

== Early pirate career ==
According to sources, Laurens de Graaf used a plain blue flag when attacking vessels.

De Graaf began his pirate career not long after marrying de Guzmán, though no records of his activity were made until 1682 when Sieur de Pouancay, the governor of Saint-Domingue, recorded that de Graaf had been sailing "on the account" since approximately 1675 or 1676 as the captain of a French privateer crew. (Note: It was also de Pouancay who recorded that De Graaf had been born in = Dordrecht, Holland)

There are some later records of his involvement, in March 1672, in a raid on Campeche by a band of pirates who attacked and torched a partially built frigate and captured the town. The next day, the same pirates captured a merchant ship loaded with over 120,000 pesos in silver and cargo, when it sailed unknowingly into the harbor. (Note: Though de Graaf is historically credited with leading the raid, the timing with respect to his marriage and time in the Canary Islands suggests records may not be entirely accurate.)

During the late 1670s, de Graaf is reported to have captured a number of vessels, converting each in turn to piracy. Starting with a small vessel he would capture a larger one, then use that vessel to capture a larger one again. Finally, in the autumn of 1679, de Graaf attacked the Spanish Armada de Barlovento and captured a frigate of 24-28 guns, which he renamed the Tigre (Tiger).

After 1682, records of de Graaf's activities are far more substantial. De Graaf had become so successful that Henry Morgan, governor of Jamaica, sent the frigate Norwich pirate-hunting, under command of Peter Haywood, with de Graaf as its primary quarry. (Note: It is not reported if Haywood encountered de Graaf.)

== The Armada de Barlovento ==
At the same time, the Spanish saw their chance to get revenge for the loss of their frigate and the Armada de Barlovento was also sent to hunt de Graaf down. During a brief stop in Cuba, de Graaf was made aware of the plan to seek him out. Rather than waiting for the Armada, de Graaf sailed immediately in search of it. After a running gun battle that lasted several hours, the Princesa struck her colors (surrendered), having lost 50 men to de Graaf's eight or nine. In an act of kindness, de Graaf put the seriously wounded captain of the Princesa ashore with his own surgeon and a servant.

The Princesa itself carried the payroll for Puerto Rico and Santo Domingo; about 120,000 pesos in silver. After sharing out the prize, the buccaneers retired to Petit-Goâve to celebrate and refit. De Graaf made the Princesa his new flagship, renaming it the Francesca.

== Van Hoorn and Veracruz ==
De Graaf's next foray was a trip to Cartagena with privateer Michiel Andrieszoon. Finding few potential targets, they departed for the Gulf of Honduras. There they found two empty galleons and de Graaf decided to wait for them to be loaded with cargo. The buccaneers retired to Bonaco Island to careen. But de Graaf and Andrieszoon had their plans ruined when Nicholas van Hoorn attacked the ships and captured them empty. Having captured the vessels, van Hoorn reached Bonaco Island and proposed to join forces with de Graaf but was turned away. Later de Graaf relented and joined forces with both van Hoorn and Michel de Grammont for an attack on Veracruz. Their raiding party consisted of 5 large vessels, 8 smaller vessels and around 1300 pirates. He rounded up over six thousand local citizens, held them inside churches and denied them food and water for three days and nights. Many were tortured, and a large number of the women were raped. Ultimately, de Graaf was instrumental in the mass kidnapping of over 1,400 people of African descent from Veracruz. The majority of these women, children, and men were sold into slavery in Saint-Domingue (modern-day Haiti), Jamaica, and Carolina.

The pirates arrived off Veracruz on 17 May 1683, leading with van Hoorn's two captured Spanish ships to mislead the town. Meanwhile, de Graaf and Yankey Willems slipped ashore with a small force of men. They proceeded to remove town's fortifications and incapacitate the town's defensive militia. (Note: Most records suggest the raid was conducted during the early morning when most militia members were asleep.) Van Hoorn, marching overland, joined with de Graaf and attacked the town.

On the second day of plundering, the Spanish plate fleet, composed of numerous warships, appeared on the horizon. The pirates retreated with hostages to the nearby Isla de Sacrificios and waited for ransoms. A quarrel erupted between van Hoorn and de Graaf over the treatment of the hostages and the division of spoils. According to some sources the two fought a duel on a nearby beach to settle the dispute. Although neither was seriously injured during the duel, van Hoorn did receive a slash across the wrist. The wound later became gangrenous and van Hoorn died as a result of the infection two weeks later. Finally, giving up on further plunder, the pirates departed, slipping past the Spanish without hindrance.

== The Fortune ==
In late November 1683, de Graaf, his compatriots and their fleet of seven ships arrived off Cartagena and held for almost a month. Local governor, Juan de Pando Estrada, commandeered three slave ships - the 40-gun San Francisco, the 34-gun Paz and a smaller 28-gun galliot. 800 Spanish, led by a 26-year-old commander, set out to meet the pirates on Christmas Eve but immediately struggled against De Graaf's more experienced pirates. 90 Spaniards were killed compared to only 20 pirates. The San Francisco was grounded and the other two ships were captured. De Graaf re-floated the San Francisco as his new flagship and renamed it the Fortune, later the Neptune. Andrieszoon took the Paz and renamed it the Mutine ("Rascal") and Willems was given command of the Francesca. The group released a large number of Spanish prisoners on Christmas Day and sent them ashore with a note for Governor Estrada thanking him for the Christmas presents. The pirates then proceeded to blockade the town.

In January 1684, an English convoy, led by the 48-gun HMS Ruby, arrived carrying a note for de Graaf from his wife offering a Spanish pardon and commission. De Graaf ignored the note, not trusting the Spanish to keep their promises, and invited English officers to board his vessels and trade with his men. The English were allowed to pass without incident and soon after, de Graaf and his compatriots left for Petit-Goâve. In the summer and fall of 1684, de Graaf remained in Petit-Goâve. He sailed in November 1684, but had little or no success in raiding the shipping lanes.

== Campeche ==
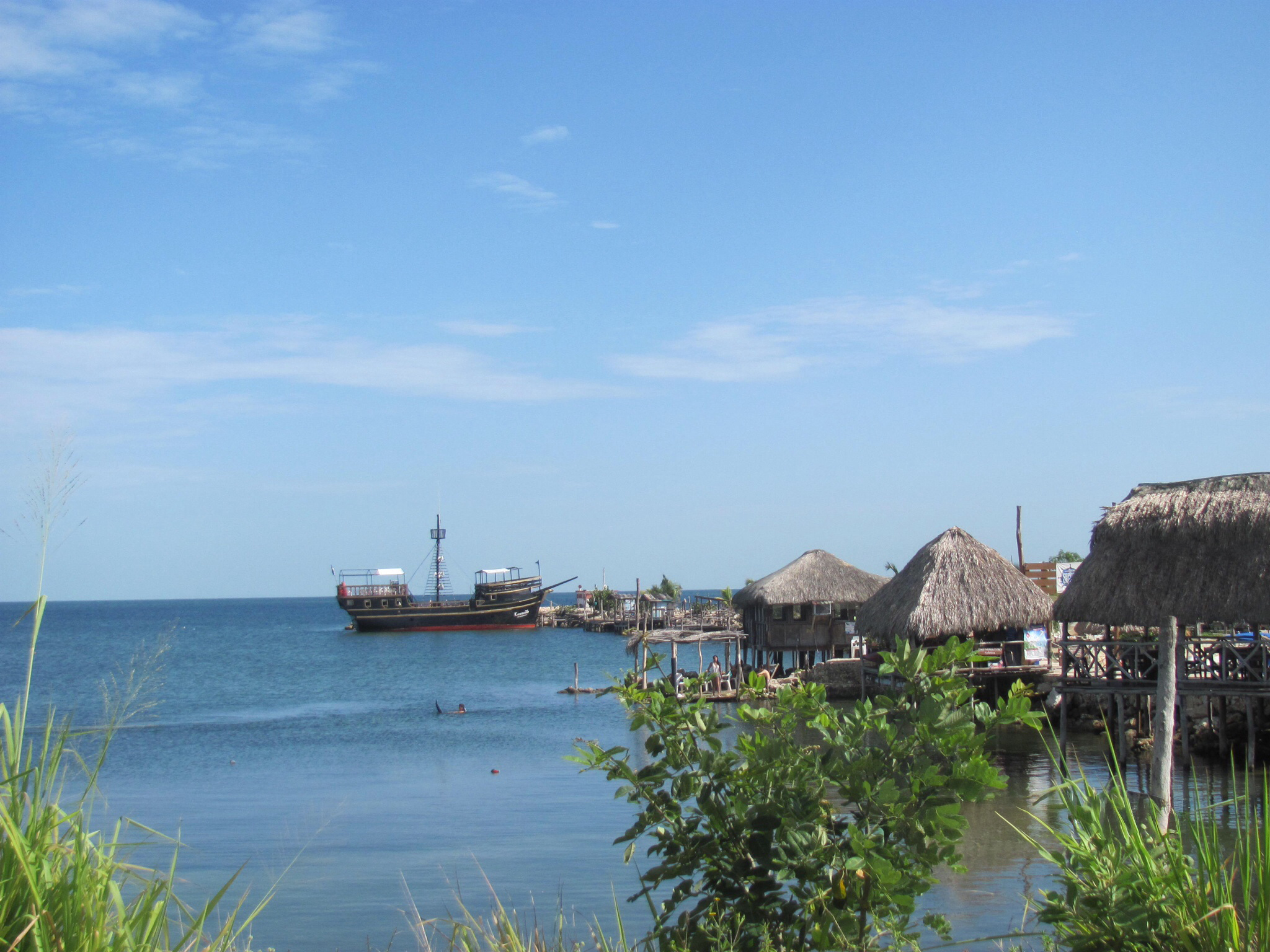
Pirates ship Lorencillo in Campeche, Mexico

De Graaf was next seen on Isla de Pinos presiding over a gathering of buccaneers. After his departure, he led yet another raid on Campeche. The pirates attacked on 6 July 1685. After a protracted battle, the Spaniards fled the town, leaving the pirates with a city devoid of plunder. The length of the battle and delay in attacking had allowed residents to move goods away. After two months in the town the pirates, failing to secure a ransom, began to burn the town and execute prisoners. Again, de Graaf stepped in to stop the violence against the hostages. The pirates departed Campeche in September 1685, carrying away many prisoners for ransom.

The pirates split up and de Graaf fled from a superior fleet off the Yucatán. After a day-long battle with two larger Spanish ships, he escaped by dumping all cargo and cannons overboard to lighten his ship. In February 1686, the Spanish staged a raid on de Graaf's property on Saint Dominque. In retaliation, de Graaf raided Tihosuco, where the buccaneers looted and burned buildings. Returning to Petit-Goâve, de Graaf wrecked his ship while pursuing a Spanish barque. Nonetheless, he managed to take the barque with only his ship's long boat.

== Valladolid ==
At some undetermined date in the seventeenth century, it is said that he was taken prisoner at the Convento de San Bernardino de Siena in Valladolid, in the present Mexican state of Yucatán.

== Later career ==
In 1687, de Graaf engaged in a battle off southern Cuba with a Biscayan frigate and the Cuban Guarda del Costa (Coast Guard). He sank several piraguas and took a small ship as prize. De Graaf returned to Saint Domingue, where he defended the harbor at Petit-Goâve against Cuban invaders. In December 1689, he took ships off Jamaica. He went on to blockade the Jamaican coast for more than six months before leaving. Proceeding to the Cayman Islands, de Graaf there captured an English sloop.

In January 1691, de Graaf attacked near Santo Domingo but was soundly defeated by a Spanish force three times the size of his French forces. He narrowly escaped with his life.

In March 1693, de Graaf met and married his second wife, Anne Dieu-le-Veut. He agreed to marry her after she threatened to shoot him for insulting her. (Note: According to Vaissière, the two were married in 1693 and their daughter was recorded as twelve years old in 1704.) De Graaf spent the summer of 1693 leading buccaneers against Jamaica in several raids; fellow buccaneer Captain Francois Le Sage, who had sailed alongside de Graaf since before Veracruz, was killed in one of the attacks on Jamaica. The English retaliated in May 1695 with an attack on Port-de-Paix at Saint Domingue, where they sacked the town and captured de Graaf's family.

== Disappearance and death ==
Laurens de Graaf was last known to be near Louisiana, where he was to help set up a French colony near present-day Biloxi, Mississippi. Some sources claim he died there; others claim locations in Alabama, while others maintain that his appearance in Louisiana and Alabama was fictional and that in fact he died in Santo Domingo in 1704.

== See also ==
- List of people who disappeared mysteriously (pre-1910)
- Nicolas Brigaut - French buccaneer, present at Campeche; at first quartermaster to Andrieszoon, he later became a Captain and sailed alongside Grammont.

== Other reading ==
- Calendar of State Papers, Colonial Series
- Wilson, J. G.; Fiske, J., eds. (1892). "Laurent, Cornelius Baldran" . Appletons' Cyclopædia of American Biography. New York: D. Appleton.
