= Nicholas van Hoorn =

17th-century Dutch pirate

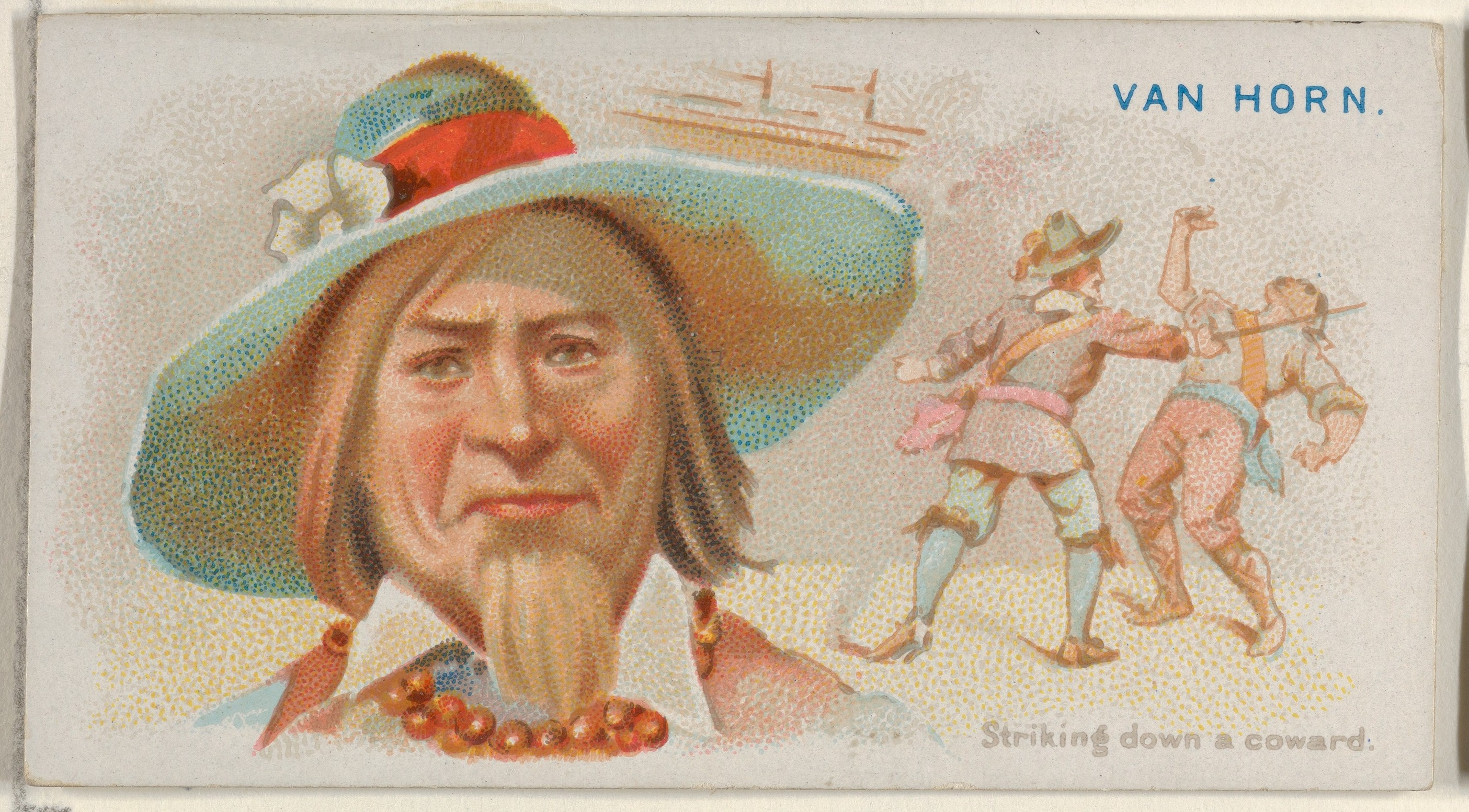
Van Horn, Striking Down a Coward, from the Pirates of the Spanish Main series (N19) for Allen & Ginter Cigarettes MET DP835000

Nicholas van Hoorn (c. 1635 in Vlissingen – buried 24 June 1683, in Isla Mujeres) was a merchant sailor, privateer and pirate. He was born in the Dutch Republic and died near Veracruz after being wounded on the Isla de Sacrificios. Nikolaas or Klaas was engaged in the Dutch merchant service from about 1655 until 1659, and then bought a vessel with his savings. With a band of reckless men whom he had enlisted, he became a terror to the commerce of the Dutch Republic and the Spanish Empire. Later he had several ships in his employment and obtained such notoriety that some governments were willing to employ him against their enemies.

== As a privateer ==
In 1666 a French minister sent Van Hoorn a commission, empowering him to pursue and capture Spanish vessels. As he was uniformly successful, he amassed enormous sums. After the Treaty of Aix-la-Chapelle, it was expected that he would cease ravaging the American coast - but the French government, while openly disowning their champion, secretly connived at his misdeeds. He made the mistake of pillaging a French ship, but after an unsuccessful attempt to take him was made in 1663, he no longer attacked the French flag.

Learning that several Spanish galleons were waiting in the harbour of Puerto Rico for a convoy, he entered the harbour and offered his services to the governor. He put forward his recent quarrel with the French, and declared that his only chance of safety was in the protection of Charles II of Spain. The governor allowed the galleons to leave port under the protection of Van Hoorn, but, as soon as they were outside the Antilles, they were attacked by the flotilla of the buccaneer, who gained over 2,000,000 livres by the adventure.

== As a pirate ==
At end of 1682, the Saint Nicholas, commanded by Nicolas Van Hoorn, arrived in the Caribbean Sea. This vessel, armed (in part) by the commander of Dover Castle, had left England the previous year, intending to trade with the Spaniards in Cádiz then in America. Nicolas Porcio, who was one of the holders of Asiento de Negros - a royal licence granting monopoly over the draft of the slaves for the Spanish colonies - had apparently promised to obtain for Van Hoorn the permission to sell him Africans in Spanish America. Said promise could not be fulfilled and Van Hoorn sought alternate employ.

Van Hoorn was then transformed into a true pirate. He plundered the coast of Western Africa expecting to be supplied with slaves, as the depositions of four of his men reveal. These depositions, taken in front of Reginald Wilson, the naval officer of Port Royal, were transmitted by the governor of Jamaica, Sir Thomas Lynch, to the secretary of the committee for the Trade and the Plantations, William Blathwayt, with his letter of 4 March 1683.

Indeed, before the arrival of Van Hoorn in America, the English colonial authorities had been informed of his piracies in Africa, and - more seriously - the fact that the Saint Nicholas had openly broken with its British ship-owners to act on Van Hoorn's own account. Thus, cruising against the forbans of the Antilles on order of the Governor Lynch, Jamaican captain George Johnson fell on Van Hoorn, in December 1682, but could not demand any account nor explanation. The president of the Royal Audience of Santo Domingo indeed prohibited Johnson from any contact with Van Hoorn. The reason was simple: the president retained the Saint Nicholas, for a flight made from Cádiz by his captain, for whom what remained in African slaves was confiscated. All this made Van Hoorn determined to gain the French part of the Hispaniola Island, to take a commission from its governor Pouançey and to assemble the famous forwarding of Veracruz.

Van Hoorn was engaged with Laurens de Graaf and Michel de Grammont in the capture of Veracruz in 1683. After the sacking of Veracruz, the two retreated to Isla de Sacrificios with prisoners where they planned to wait for ransom payments. Impatient that payments did not arrive immediately, Van Hoorn ordered the execution of a dozen prisoners and had their heads sent to Veracruz as a warning. De Graaf was furious; the two argued and then fought a duel. Van Hoorn received a minor wound and was returned to his ship in shackles. The wound soon turned gangrenous and Van Hoorn died shortly thereafter. Despite Van Hoorn's death, the pirate crews of 1683 completed the mass kidnapping of the Afro-Veracruzan population. Over 1,400 women, children and men of African descent were taken from Veracruz and sold into slavery in Saint-Domingue (Haiti), Jamaica, and Carolina during the summer of 1683.
