= Petit-Goâve =

Petit-Goâve Ti Gwav
- Commune
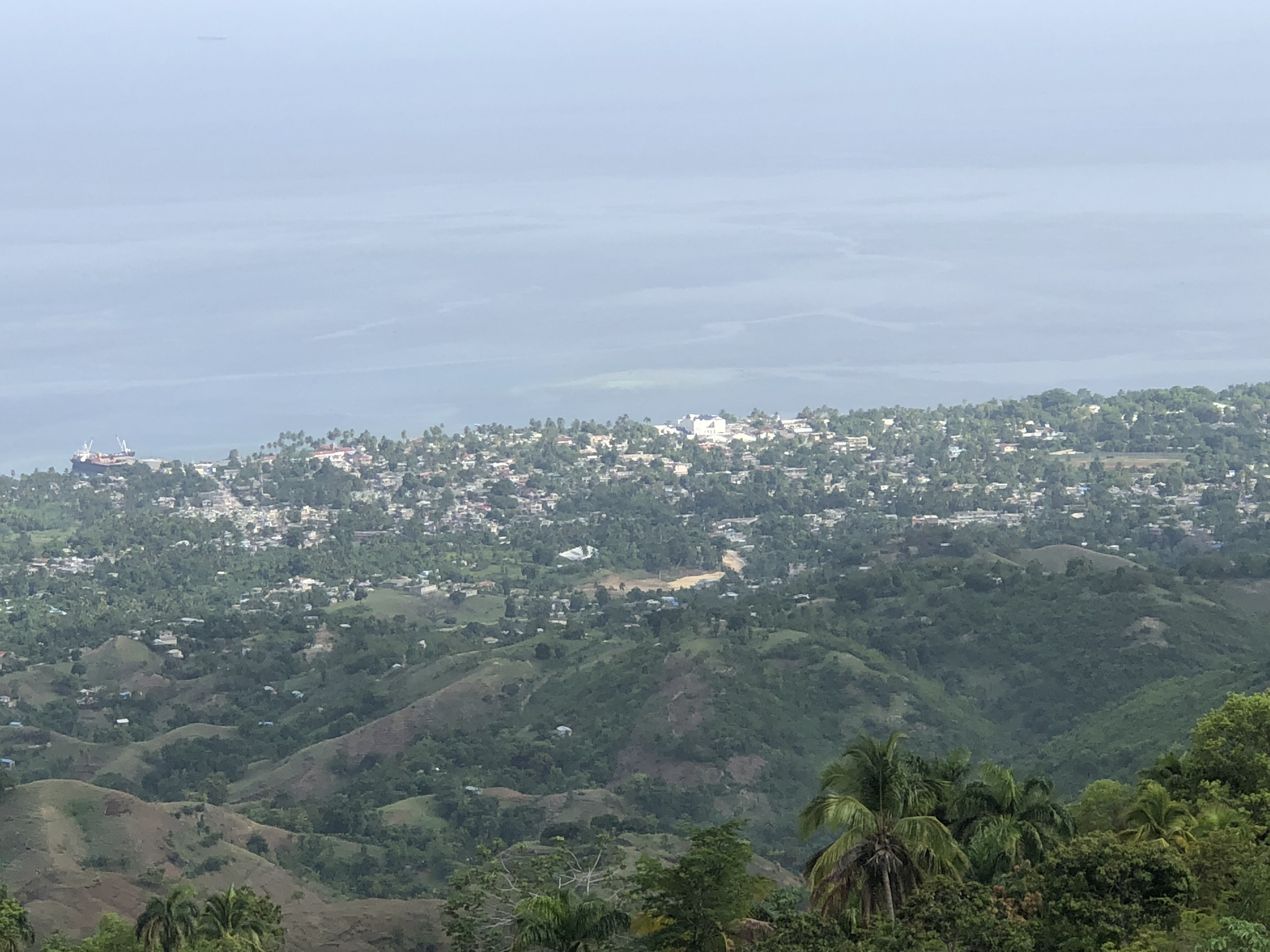
- View of the town of Petit-Goâve

- Location in Haiti
- Coordinates: 18°25′53″N 72°52′1″W
- Country: Haiti
- Department: Ouest
- Arrondissement: Léogâne

Population
  - Total: 12,000
- Time zone: UTC-05:00 (EST)
  - Summer (DST): UTC-04:00 (EDT)

Petit-Goâve (French pronunciation: [pəti ɡɔav]; Haitian Creole: Ti Gwav) is a coastal commune in the Léogâne Arrondissement in the Ouest department of Haiti. It is located 68 kilometres (42 mi) southwest of Port-au-Prince. The town has a population of approximately 12,000 inhabitants.

== History ==
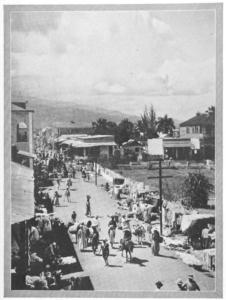
Petit-Goâve in 1926

The town is one of the oldest cities of the country, and was named Goâve by the Amerindians. The Spanish called it Aguava at the end of the 16th century. After French colonization through the releasing of the Spanish, the French divided the city into two halves; Grand-Goâve and Petit-Goâve. Petit-Goâve became a wealthy settlement and briefly functioned as a de facto capital of the prosperous colony of Saint-Domingue. It is also very famous for its sweet candy called dous makòs.

=== January 2010 earthquake ===
The town was significantly affected by the 12 January 2010 earthquake. On 20 January a strong aftershock of magnitude 5.9 M_{w} struck Haiti. The U.S. Geological Survey reported that its epicenter was almost exactly under Petit-Goâve. The magnitude of the aftershock was initially reported as 6.1 by the USGS, but was later revised to 5.9.

On the 19th, authorized by the Haitian government, 1300 US Marines were deployed equally between Petit-Goâve and Grand-Goâve. Spanish amphibious assault ship Castilla is to arrive at Petit-Goâve beginning in February to assist in recovery efforts.

By 9 February 2010, the US 24th Marine Expeditionary Unit was rotating out of Haiti, having been replaced by the US 22nd Marine Expeditionary Unit, in their position on USS Bataan and Carrefour, Léogâne, Petit-Goâve, and Grand-Goâve.

Aid For Haiti (AFH), a US-based non-profit has been coordinating some of the local medical care in the area of Petit-Goâve. They are located at the Wesleyan Compound in Petit-Goâve.

The 400th episode of the radio program This American Life, which aired in February 2010, featured a story on College Harry Brakeman, a school in Petit-Goâve, and estimated 1,000 people died due to the earthquake.

== Notable people ==
- Laurens de Graaf (d. 1704), Dutch pirate and privateer captain in French service, based in Petit-Goâve during French colonial rule
- Anne Dieu-le-Veut (1661–1710), female Buccaneer and wife to Laurens de Graaf
- Dany Laferrière, Haitian-Canadian writer
- Faustin Elie Soulouque (Faustin I), President of Haiti (1847–1849), Emperor of Haiti (1849–1859)

== Facilities ==
Petit-Goâve has a hospital, Notre-Dame de Petit-Goâve. In February 2010, this hospital was largely unusable due to damage from the earthquake. The Norwegian Red Cross ERU (Emergency Response Unit) has established their field hospital in the hospital and runs 2 fully equipped Operation Theaters and 2 ambulances with paramedics. Norwegian Red Cross support the hospital with electrical power, medical equipment and medicine.

On February 15, 2013, the US State Department's Bureau of International Narcotics and Law Enforcement Affairs announced that it would be funding and building a 150-bed prison in Petit-Goâve to replace the one destroyed in 2004 after the ousting of President Jean-Bertrand Aristide.

== Pictures ==
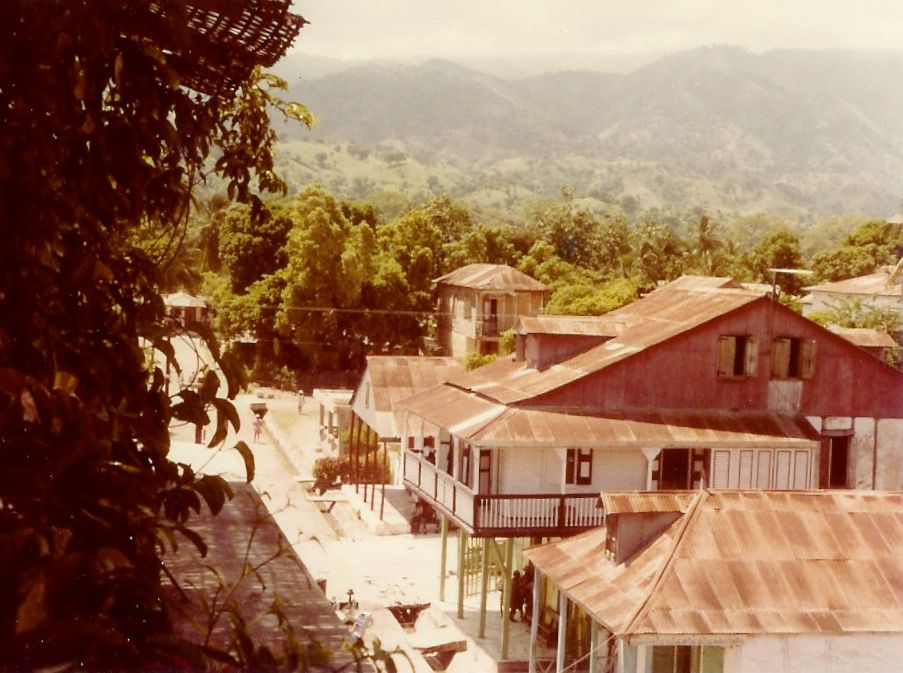
The town of Petit-Goâve in 1981

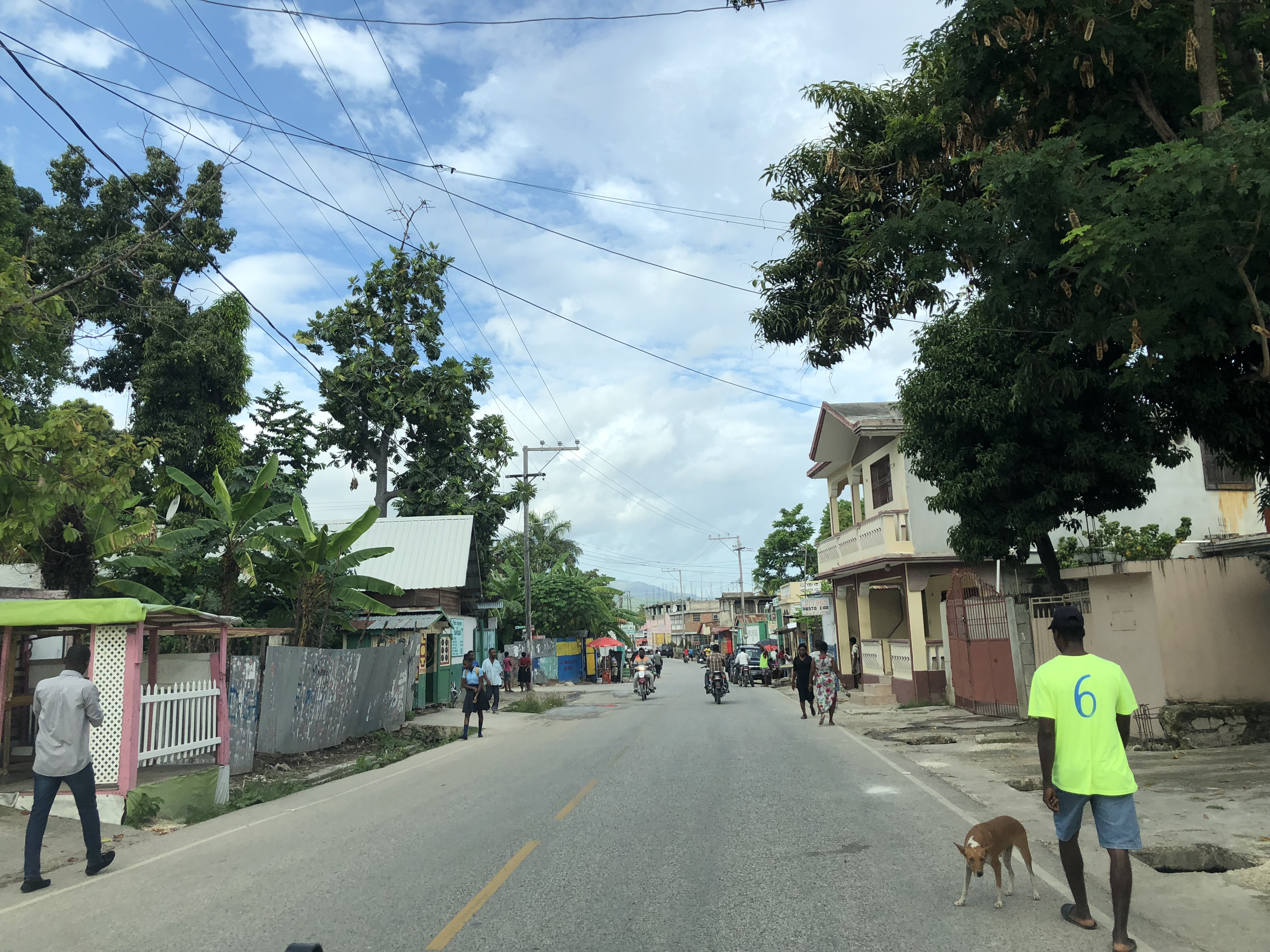
Street scene in Petit-Goâve

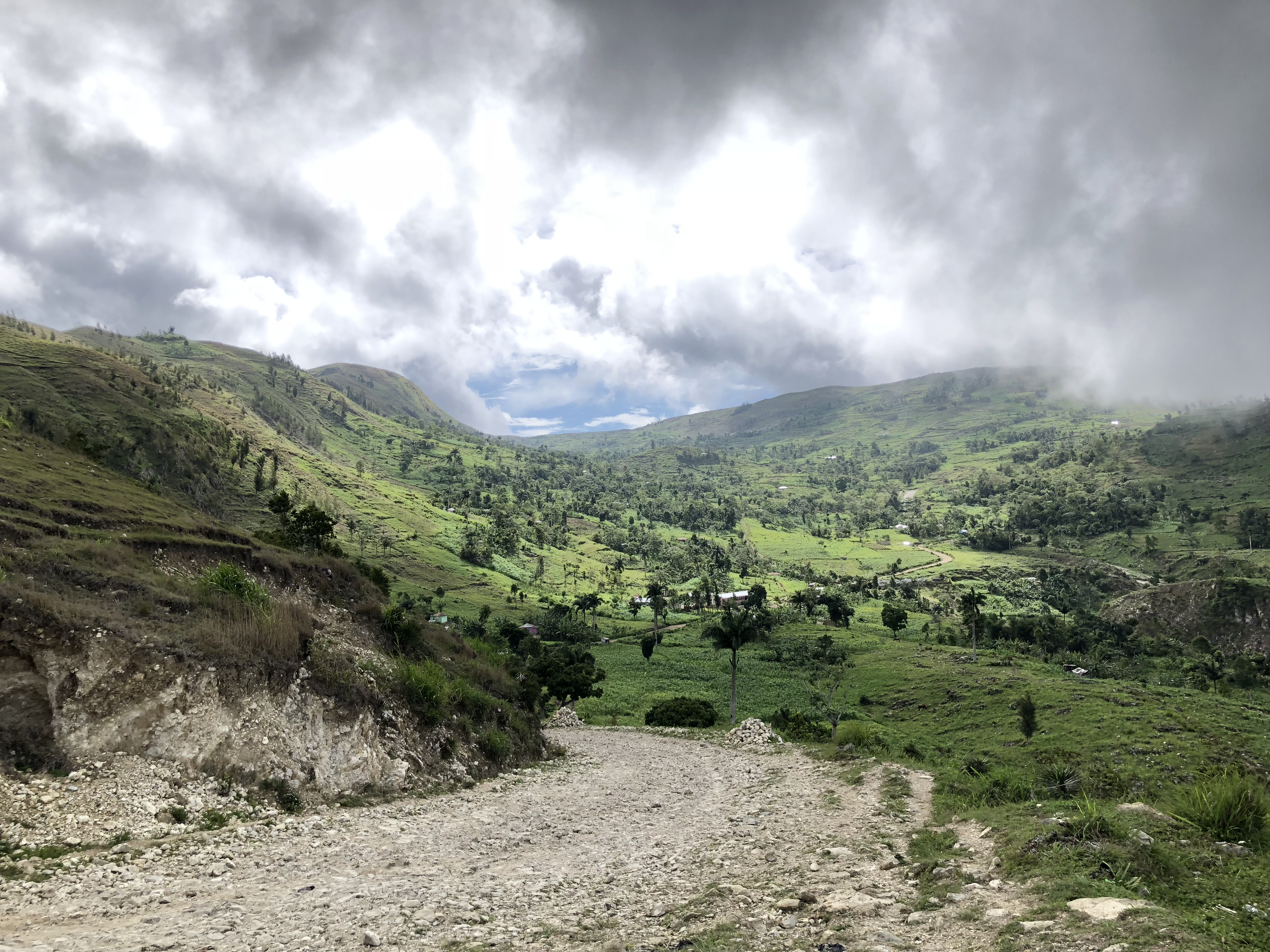
Landscape in Les Palmes

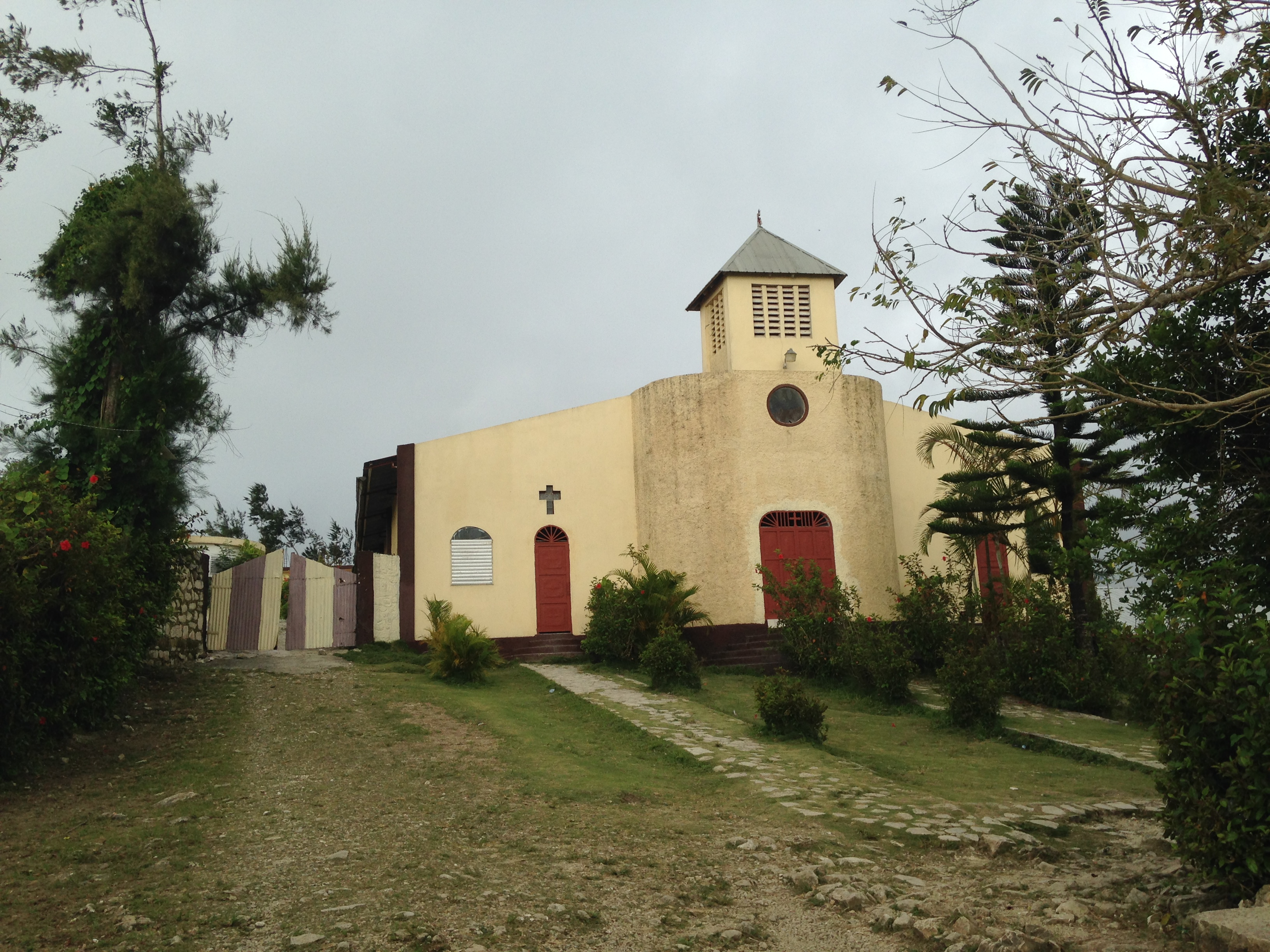
A catholic church in the village of Delatte

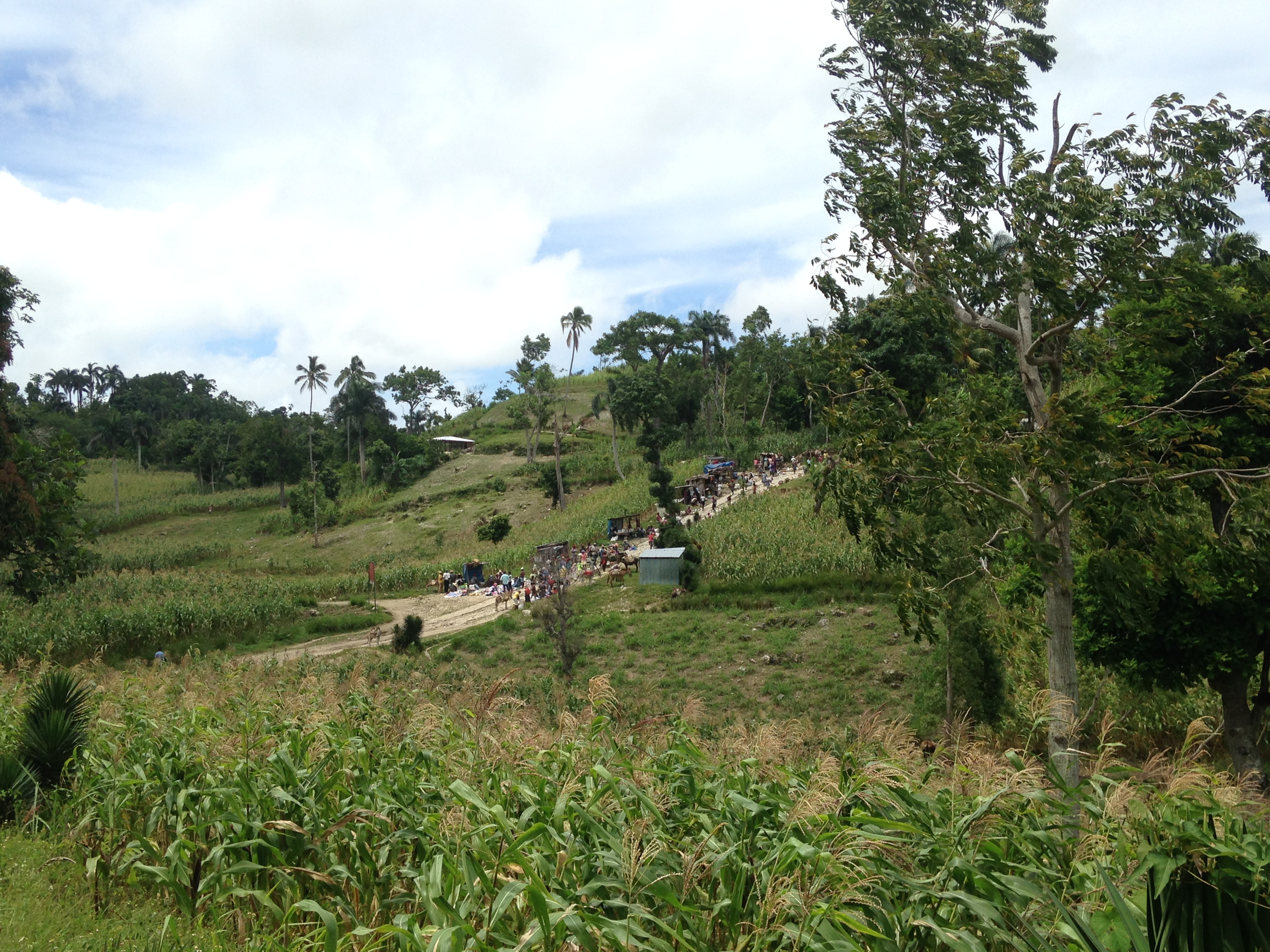
A market in Delatte
