= Los Trios Ringbarkus =

Australian stand up comedy duo

Los Trios Ringbarkus was an Australian stand up comedy duo prominent in the 1980s, comprising Neill Gladwin (born 1961) and Steve Kearney (born 1961).

== Live act ==
Both members were born in Melbourne, Gladwin in Essendon and Kearney in Burwood. They attended Rusden State College, studying to be drama teachers: at a party, Kearney broke an egg on Gladwin's head, and the two men recognised a common sense of humour. Their name was, of course, a joke; they were always a duo, though early in their career they would refer to a former third member who 'went back to his accountancy business' or who 'got so small he disappeared and became an accountant and lives in Geelong.'

The duo often referred to themselves as 'anti-tainment'. Their act would often begin with them appearing to stumble onto stage by accident; 'staring out at the audience in sheer terror,' as one witness described it, 'whimpering in agony, stumbling across the stage entangled in microphone leads unable to speak as they gag on throats dry with fear.' During their show Gladwin would often play what one journalist described in 1982 as 'punk-rock accordion', accompanied by Kearney on guitar. Their comedic approach has been typified as undergoing two main phases: confrontational and deliberately offensive humour gave way in the mid-80s to much more considered slapstick comparable to silent film comedy of the early 20th century. However, both styles coexisted, and their interest in physical comedy is evident from an early publicity campaign whereby they offered themselves as expert pie-throwers. Members of the public could 'Hire a pie in the eye' for $10. Gladwin and Kearney demonstrated their skill by throwing a pie at Joe Dolce on the pop TV show Countdown. They claimed to the press that they were available to throw a pie at Prime Minister Malcolm Fraser for $1000 and whatever legal costs would ensue.

Both men appeared in Geoff Hooke's production of Kurt Weill and Bertolt Brecht's Rise and Fall of the City of Mahagonny (abbreviated to Mahoganny) at the Contemporary Performance Centre, located in the Hawthorn Congregational Church, in late 1981. This was the only 'serious' theatre they appeared in under the Los Trios Ringbarkus name, and the only production they did not write themselves. An unsuccessful attempt was made by the Playbox Theatre Company to mount a production of Samuel Beckett's Waiting for Godot some years later in which they were to be featured cast members alongside either Frank Thring or Warren Mitchell.

As Los Trios Ringbarkus they performed a range of highly successful comedy shows. In late 1981, critic Peter Weiniger wrote:'Tough, zany, threatening, but always highly original their humour almost defies definition with a range that stretches from sheery [sic] anarchy to carefully controlled mayhem.' For months later, the same critic lauded them as authors of 'silent comedy in the finest traditions of the Mack Sennett comedies and Laurel and Hardy.' In August 1982, at the opening of a season at the Last Laugh Theatre Restaurant, Kearney broke his leg on stage. The incident necessitated rescheduling of the show, which opened an opportunity for the comedian Mark Little. Little would later appear in the short film Tennis Elbow with the duo.

In 1983, Los Trios Ringbarkus were showing themselves to be adaptable the mainstream media in Australia; they appeared, for instance, on Hey Hey It's Saturday. They also debuted at the Edinburgh Festival, in the Assembly Room. Here they were to be winners of the Perrier Comedy Award for Best Comedy, the first Australian comedians to win this award. Gladwin later mused:

The English Press were horrified that we had no jokes or scripts and no satire and no wit. Then a review in London loved the fact that we were working against all forms of comedy which they're used to… Melbourne has real characters like the Whittles who are a send-up. It's sort of cutting and it rides the edges of the people in the audience.

To this, Kearney added: 'Because they're so deeply rooted in the Pythons and Goons tradition... there are John Cleese clones doing shows all over the place. We were seen as new and exciting and above all refreshing.' The Perrier award led to increased coverage in the mainstream media, including an appearance on The Don Lane Show.

In early 1984, Kearney undertook some acting work on his own, playing Monk O'Neil in a revival of Jack Hibberd's one-man play A Stretch of the Imagination, directed by Lois Ellis.

Between 1984-5 Los Trios Ringbarkus released three records on the White Label: two singles, "Cooking in the Kitchen" for which they made a video, and "Mirror, Mirror" as well as a mini-album, Sorry 'Bout the Record Record, most of which was recorded live.

At the end of 1984 they launched what was to become their longest-lasting and most successful show, Outer Sink, an 'Epic Rock Comedy Odyssey Performance Art Dance, Theatre-in-Education Sort of Thing'. It was 'designed' and directed by Nigel Triffitt. The show travelled around Australia and internationally. They appeared at the Adelaide Festival, then returned to the Edinburgh Festival as well as appearing in New York and travelling across Canada. The duo's success at Edinburgh in particular had raised expectations for other Australian (particularly Melbourne) acts at that event: Gladwin observed that 'This year it was possible to travel to Edinburgh and meet just about all the people you work with in Australia.'

Outer Sink was also performed at the 1986 Montreal International Mime Festival and another show, Rampant Stupidity was successful in North America the following year. In January 1988 they also performed at the London International Mime Festival.

== On screen ==
Given the references to silent film comedy made in much of their performance, as well as their increasing popularity, it seemed like a natural next step for Los Trios Ringbarkus to go into film or television. In February 1983, the Melbourne Age dropped a hint that the duo were making a film (for which they ostensibly required ten blowflies). This is most likely to have been Tennis Elbow, directed by John Thomson and starring Gladwin and Kearney alongside Lance Curtis, Elsa Davies, Geoff Kelso, Mark Little, Sai McEnna, David Swann, and featuring 'The St Kilda Esplanade, a galvanised barbecue, Homicide, a tennis match and a toilet joke.' The film is a loosely-linked series of sketches based primarily around a tennis match in which a sophisticated playboy repeatedly hits the ball an unfeasibly long distance, and his opponent enthusiastically, and improbably, is able to return it each time through superhuman effort. In doing so he engages with (or the camera simply turns to) bizarre and unusual situations. The film, made at Swinburne Institute of Technology film school, was shown as a featured attraction at the comedy venue Le Joke in March 1984.

Amazing Scenes was a 1980 documentary film about Australian fringe theatre, directed by Karl McPhee, narrated by Spike Milligan, and produced by Film Australia. The film featured Los Trios Ringbarkus along with David Argue, Circus Oz, Wimmins Circus, Clowneroonies (featuring Geoffrey Rush), Reg Livermore Alan Pentland, Rod Quantock, St Martins Youth Arts Centre, Cappriccios, Kirribilli Pub Theatre, Sideshow, and Lobotomy Brothers. The DVD is available from the NFSA.

In the mid-1980s Los Trios Ringbarkus approached Nadia Tass and David Parker, who had recently had major success with their film Malcolm, with ideas for a Los Trios Ringbarkus film. Instead, Tass and Parker were inspired to cast Kearney alone in their next film, Rikky and Pete.

The 1989 television variety series The Beach Boys: Endless Summer included apparently specially-filmed Los Trios Ringbarkus material as incidental comedy spots. The duo do not seem to have been featured players, although the act's name was included in programming schedules.

== Garbo, and the duo's demise ==
Gladwin and Kearney relocated to Los Angeles in 1987 with ambitions to make films in Hollywood. In the mid-1980s, Kearney later stated, they had simultaneous deals with United Artists and Columbia Pictures. He claimed, 'we would waltz into town and take over. "We rule! We rock!" the heads of the studios were bringing all their big stars along to see us. But we didn't really appreciate it. We had no idea."

They were working on the script for what was to become Garbo in at least 1988 if not earlier. The cartoonist, humorist and scriptwriter Patrick Cook was the third writer, and the film's premise came from Hugh Rule, who acted as producer. Filmed in 1990, starring Gladwin, Kearney, Max Cullen, Imogen Annesley and Moya O'Sullivan and directed by Ron Cobb, Garbo opened in May, 1992. It was commercially disastrous, described by one journalist as the 'film that killed Los Trios Ringbarkus.' A decade later, Kearney reflected that he and Gladwin 'knew there was something wrong with it, but we hoped it could be seen in a good light. It had a smell about it, and everyone was running away from it.' He claimed that, had it been a success, 'Neill and I would be making another one.' However, 'It was universally hated. It's a big source of regret.'

Although the pair were reported in 1983 as saying 'they work well together because they are not close friends and their personalities are very different,' Kearney later compared their 1992 split as being 'like a marriage ending.'

In 2003, they briefly reformed and performed at the Melbourne Comedy Festival.

== After Los Trios Ringbarkus ==
Two years after the duo ended their association, Gladwin was equivocal, telling journalist Peter Wilmoth 'The decision from both of us to work elsewhere was really very positive,' and that their time as a duo 'took us all around the world, and it was a wonderful privilege.'

Gladwin was appointed to Magpie, the youth branch of the State Theatre Company of South Australia. He directed Lano and Woodley in the show with which they won the Perrier Award in Edinburgh in 1994. He later worked on the closing ceremony of the 2000 Summer Olympics and was also the creative director of the 2000 Summer Paralympics . He directed a production of Wagner's Götterdämmerung for the Perth Festival.

Steve Kearney spent most of the 1990s in Los Angeles. Prior to the release of Garbo he had made The Nutt House (also known as The Nutty Nut) with Traci Lords and later starred in Kissy Cousins, Monster Babies and Morphing Elvis a film which some sources suggest was not released until 2018 at which point it was a 39-minute short. He also had guest roles in Thirtysomething, Friends, and Ned and Stacey. He returned to Australia in 1999, and continues to enjoy success in the film and theatre industries.
