= Future Past =

Future Past may refer to:

- Future Past (Duncan James album), released in 2006
- Future Past (Duran Duran album), released in 2021
- Future Past (film), a 1987 Australian science fiction film
- "Futurepast", Logan' s Run episode 10 (1978)
- "Future Past: An Exercise in Horror", a 1994 poem by Bruce Boston
- "Future Past", a 2020 poem by David C. Kopaska-Merkel
- a retrofuture
