= Playing Beatie Bow (film) =

- Playing Beatie Bow poster
- Directed by: Donald Crombie
- Written by: Peter Gawler; Irwin Lane
- Based on: Ruth Park's novel
- Produced by: Jock Blair; Bruce Moir; John Morris
- Starring: Imogen Annesley; Peter Phelps; Mouche Phillips; Nikki Coghill; Moya O'Sullivan
- Cinematography: Geoffrey Simpson
- Edited by: Andrew Prowse
- Music by: Garry McDonald / Laurie Stone
- Production company: South Australian Film Corporation
- Distributed by: CEL Film Distribution
- Release date: 7 August 1986
- Running time: 93 minutes
- Country: Australia
- Language: English
- Budget: A$4.4 million
- Box office: A$97,036 (Australia)

Playing Beatie Bow is a 1986 Australian fantasy drama film based on the 1980 novel Playing Beatie Bow by Ruth Park. The film is directed by Donald Crombie based on a screenplay by Peter Gawler and Irwin Lane. It stars Imogen Annesley, Peter Phelps and Mouche Phillips.

== Plot summary ==
Beatrice May "Beatie" Bow, a young Victorian-era girl, is summoned from the past to contemporary 1986 Sydney by children chanting her name in a game of Beatie Bow. Fourteen-year-old Abigail Kirk, whose mother Kathy was looking at rekindling her relationship with her estranged husband, accidentally follows Beatie back to September 1873, in Sydney-Town in the colony of New South Wales. Beatie's family, including Granny and Dovey, believe Abigail is the promised "Stranger" who will arrive to save "The Gift" for future generations of Bows. The Gift comes at great sacrifice, though, as one of the Bow children—either Beatie, the "poorly" middle brother Gilbert Samuel (Gibbie) or the eldest brother Judah will die at a young age (Everyone including Gibbie is convinced that he will be the one to die young). Abigail is trapped in the past until she does what she was "sent" to do, even though she does not know what this is. During her sojourn, she falls in love for the first time with Judah (who is promised to marry Dovey) and gains a more mature perspective on her parents' re-forming relationship.

After returning to her own time, Abigail finds that her friends Justine and her daughter, eight-year-old Natalie, are descendants of the Bow family and learns the fate of the Bow children. Beatie never married or had children, though she achieved her childhood dream of becoming a scholar and became the longtime headmistress of the Fort Street School and died in the 1920s. Gibbie, despite being convinced that he would be the one to die young, married an undertaker's daughter and lived until 1940 when he was 76 and was actually Justine's great-grandfather. Abigail had saved Gibbie from a fire that all but destroyed the Bows' home located above Samuel Bow's confectionery shop, which was what she as the "Stranger" was sent to do thus preserving "The Gift" for future generations of the Bow family. Judah, whom Abigail had fallen in love with, married Dovey and they had a daughter in 1874, though the child died before her first birthday while Dovey died in 1919. Natalie then tells Abigail that Judah died in a shipwreck just outside of Hobart-Town at the age of 19, thus becoming the great sacrifice. Abigail then meets Justine's younger brother Robert who bears a striking resemblance to Judah and the pair fall in love, while Vincent, Natalie's brother, has assumed the Bow family "gift" allowing him to become a talented piano player.

== Cast ==
- Imogen Annesley as Abigail Kirk
- Peter Phelps as Judah Bow / Robert Bow
- Mouche Phillips as Beatrice May 'Beatie' Bow
- Nikki Coghill as Dorcas 'Dovey' Bow
- Moya O'Sullivan as Granny Tallisker
- Don Barker as Samuel Bow
- Lyndel Rowe as Kathy Kirk
- Barbara Stephens as Justine Crown
- Damian Janko as Gilbert Samuel 'Gibbie' Bow
- Phoebe Salter as Natalie Crown
- Su Cruickshank as Madam
- Edwin Hodgeman as Sir
- Henry Salter as Swanton
- Jo England as Doll
- Edward Caddick as Legless
- Glenn Boswell as Parrot
- Richard Boue as Fidge
- Michaele Read as Blackie
- Johnny Hallyday as Ben
- Tim Perry as Jacko
- Perri Hamilton as Singer
- Rob George as Highland Piper
- Grant Piro as Pino
- Leonie Page as Samantha
- Samantha Bott as Nicole
- Ben Hockley as Randall
- Marcus Corrigan-Travis as Jason
- Carolyn Brown as Ellie
- Phyllis Burford as School Mistress
- Graham Caldwell as English Earl
- Sukru Icimsoy as Turkish Nobleman
- Jo Nguyen as Chinese Nobleman
- Warwick Cooper as Tripe Man
- Wan Thye Lieu as Chinese Laundryman no 1
- Jo Ip as Chinese Laundryman no 2
- St George Cheer Girls as Pom Pom Girls
- Mantis Motor Cycle Club as Bikies
- Rita Fletcher, Anne Jones, Kerry Page, Suszie Hoskins as Harlots
- Tuoi Van Tran, Jolly Koh, Tom Ka, Vincent Khut as Fan Tan Players
- Phillip Sawyers, Jerry Taite, David Tong as Press Gang (Brothel)
- Pat Wilson as Pianist (Brothel)

== Production ==
Playing Beatie Bow is directed by Donald Crombie, and produced by Jock Blair, Bruce Moir and John Morris. It is rated PG instead of the milder G because Abigail uses a swear word ("shit") towards the end of the film as well as two scenes in which Annesley appeared semi-nude. Also, due to Annesley only being 16 at the time of filming, the kissing scenes between herself and 26-year-old Phelps were "toned down" to avoid controversy.

Most of the film was shot in Adelaide, including using one of the city's iconic indoor amusement arcades "Downtown" and its popular second-floor roller skating rink for a scene early in the film. AU$400,000 was spent on recreating Sydney's Rocks area in a disused industrial site.

== Box office ==
Playing Beatie Bow grossed $97,306 at the box office in Australia, However the film was popular on video.

== See also ==
- Cinema of Australia
- List of Australian films
- South Australian Film Corporation
