= Playing Beatie Bow =

Novel by Ruth Park

- First edition
- Author: Ruth Park
- Language: English
- Genre: Children's novel
- Publisher: Thomas Nelson
- Publication date: 31 January 1980
- Publication place: Australia
- Media type: Print
- Pages: 196

Playing Beatie Bow is a popular Australian children's novel, written by Ruth Park and first published on 31 January 1980. It features a time slip in Sydney, Australia.

== Plot summary ==
Lynette Kirk has been a happy child, cheery about her parents and life, until the day her father leaves her and her mother Kathy for another woman. Lynette wants to distance herself from the life they have shared with her father and changes her name to Abigail.

Abigail goes down to the park with her young next-door neighbours, Natalie and Vincent. She finds the children there playing a game called "Beatie Bow". After becoming very interested in a "Little Furry Girl" (named so because of her short shaved hair) who stands there watching them play, Abigail decides to follow her.

When Abigail's mother admits that she has been seeing her father again and would like them all to move to Norway, where he works as an architect, Abigail is furious and goes for a walk to cool off, again encountering the mysterious girl. She follows her back into the 1800s and is tripped up by Beatie's father, Samuel, resulting in injuries.

Further into the novel the character Granny (Alice Tallisker) tells Abigail that she is "the stranger" and has "the gift". "The gift" comes from a crocheted detail on her dress. The book later suggests that Granny will complete the crochet.

Abigail falls in love with Judah (the little girl's eldest brother), who is betrothed to Dovey, and realises first-hand what it is like to love somebody but not be able to have them. This helps Abigail to realise that she should not be selfish towards her parents and let them have a second chance at life and marriage.

Abigail finally manages to return to her own time and discovers that her neighbours, Natalie and Vincent, are descendants of the Bow family. She also finds that Beatie will grow up to be a lady and well educated, and Judah will die at sea after marrying Dovey. After Abigail returns from Norway with her parents she meets Natalie and Vincent's uncle, Robert, who strongly resembles Judah. The two fall in love and Abigail tells him the story of Beatie Bow.

== Reviews ==
According to a review by a scholar of today, Playing Beatie Bow falls somewhere between a children's book and young-adult fiction.

== Main characters ==
- Abigail Kirk, formerly Lynette Kirk

In the present

- Katherine "Kathy" Kirk
- Weyland Kirk
- Natalie Crown
- Robert Judah Bow

In 1873

- Beatrice May "Beatie" Bow ("The little furry girl")
- Alice Tallisker (Granny Tallisker)
- Samuel Bow
- Judah Bow
- Dorcas "Dovey" Tallisker
- Gilbert Samuel "Gibbie" Bow

== Locations ==
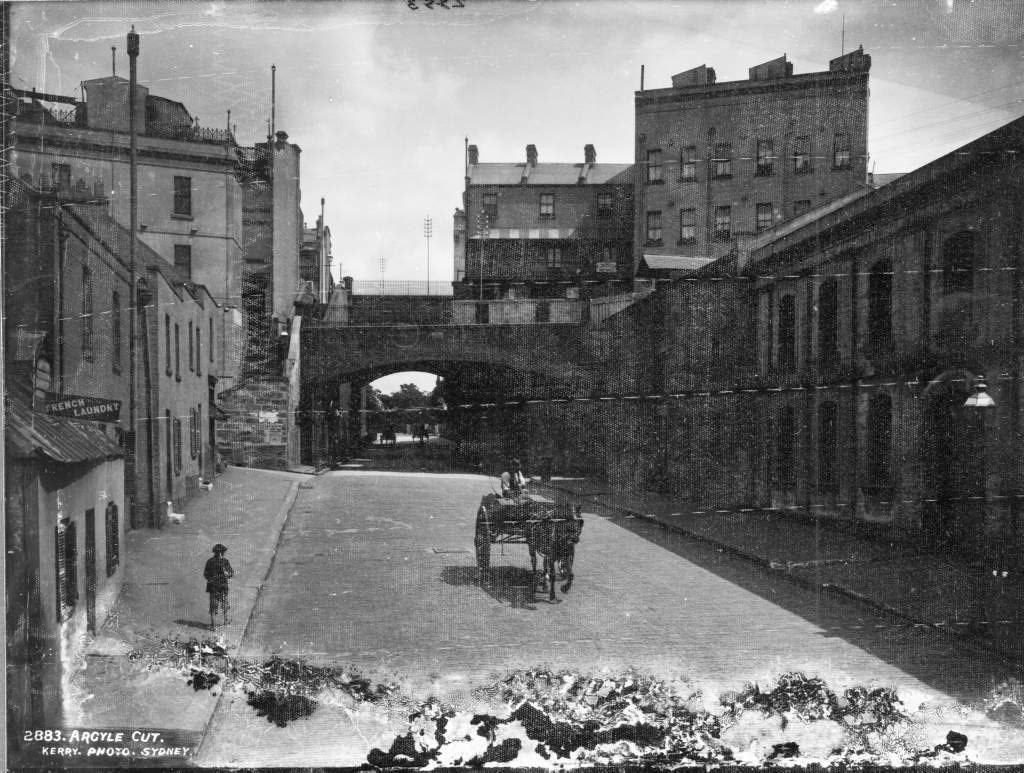
Westward view along Argyle Street from Harrington Street towards Cambridge Street and the Cut, around 1900.

- The Bows' confectionery shop is located on the corner of Argyle Street and Cambridge Street, immediately to the east of the Argyle Cut, see maps at Wikimedia geohack.
- The fictional high-rise tower "Mitchell", where the Kirks and the Crowns live, is located on George Street to the south of "The Suez Canal" (approximate location on map). In real life the only high-rise building in the Rocks is the Sirius building, located much further north. This was used for the film.
- The Suez Canal, where Abigail was abducted, is located in between the Mitchell tower and the Cut (map). The name "Suez Canal" is said to have emerged as a pun on both "sewers", as the lane was one of the most disreputable places in the Rocks, and the Suez Canal in Egypt.

== Adaptations ==
In 1986, the book was turned into a feature film also called Playing Beatie Bow. Made by the South Australian Film Corporation, it starred Imogen Annesley as Abigail, Peter Phelps as Judah Bow and Mouche Phillips as the title character Beatie Bow.

On 22 February — 1 May 2021, the Sydney Theatre Company performed a play based on the book, written by the leading Australian playwright Kate Mulvany and artistic director Kip Williams, the duo responsible for the multi-award-winning 2018 stage adaptation of Park's book The Harp in the South. It was sold out.

== Awards ==
- Won – CBCA Children's Book of the Year Award: Older Readers (1981)
- Won – Parents' Choice Award for Literature, awarded by the Parents' Choice Foundation (1982)
- Won – Boston Globe-Horn Book Award (1982)
- Honour Diploma – International Board on Books for Young People (Australia) (1982)
- Runner-up – Guardian Fiction Prize (UK) (1982)
- Won – Canberra's Own Outstanding List: Fiction for Older Readers Award (1994)
