= Garbo (film) =

Garbo By Stephen Green
- Directed by: Ron Cobb
- Written by: Patrick Cook; Neill Gladwin; Steve Kearney
- Produced by: Neill Gladwin; Steve Kearney; Margot McDonald; Hugh Rule
- Starring: Steve Kearney; Neill Gladwin; Max Cullen
- Cinematography: Geoff Burton
- Edited by: Neil Thumpston
- Music by: Allan Zavod
- Production company: Eclectic Films
- Distributed by: Hoyts-Fox-Columbia TriStar Films
- Release date: 21 May 1992
- Running time: 100 minutes
- Country: Australia
- Language: English
- Box office: A$1,250,000 (Australia)

Garbo is a 1992 Australian comedy film directed by Ron Cobb. It was written by the Australian comedians Neill Gladwin and Steve Kearney with Patrick Cook from a story by Hugh Rule. Max Cullen, Moya O'Sullivan and Imogen Annesley also star. Filmed in Melbourne, the story focuses on two Australian garbagemen (garbos in Australian slang) who have to compete with a new corporate outfit which also has ambitions to redevelop parts of the suburb in which they work. The film's engagement with the simpler pleasures of community life reflects the work of Jacques Tati, who both Gladwin and Kearney admired.

== Cast ==
- Steve Kearney as Steve
- Neill Gladwyn as Neill
- Max Cullen as Wal
- Moya O'Sullivan as Freda
- Imogen Annesley as Jane
- Gerard Kennedy as Trevor
- John Brumpton as Troy
- Tommy Dysart as Bagpipes
- Max Fairchild as Big Feral
- Roderick Williams as Pope
- David Glazebrook as Fragile
- Earl Francis as Control Tower Garbo
- Ray Chubb as Garbo Foreman
- Simon Chilvers as Detective
- Harold Baigent as Old Resident with Cat
- Vic Gordon as Old Time Card Sharp
- Michael Veitch as Town Clerk
- Jane Clifton as Mayor
- Alex Menglet as Czech Agent

== Music ==
The Celtic punk band The Pogues recorded a song, "In and Out," for the film's soundtrack. Kate Ceberano and Yothu Yindi also contributed music for the film. Ceberano and her band recorded a version of Wa Wa Nee's song "I Want You" and can be seen performing the song in a club scene.

== Reception ==
The film was much anticipated, but poorly received. While recognising that Los Trios Ringbarkus were 'astonishingly successful' within the '"stumbling dills" school of comedy', Jim Schembri wrote of Garbo that:

The film is incredibly pretentious, which may be a ridiculous charge to level at a film as lame-brained as this, but something must be said when pseudo-radical Lefty cliches get bandied around. The film makes these Left-wing platitudes about the evils of big business and how technology encroaches on jobs for humans... Yet the role of Jane (Imogen Annesley), Neill's love interest, is insultingly sexist. Jane is supposed to be an intellectual, yet she has absolutely no emotional range or depth... Director Rob Cobb missed the boat with this. A designer of enormous talent, an artist and cartoonist of great wit and perception, he has misfired in a major way. Surely someone with great visual flair should have at least made the film look interesting. The only contribution Cobb appears to have made is in the design of a garbage truck.

== See also ==
- Los Trios Ringbarkus
