= Palawan fruit bat =

Conservation status
- Vulnerable (IUCN 3.1)
- CITES Appendix II

Scientific classification
- Kingdom: Animalia
- Phylum: Chordata
- Class: Mammalia
- Order: Chiroptera
- Family: Pteropodidae
- Genus: Acerodon
- Species: A. leucotis

Binomial name
- Acerodon leucotis (Sanborn, 1950)
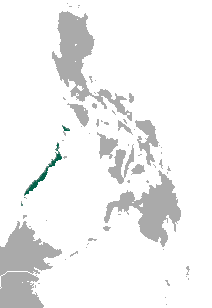
- Palawan fruit bat range

Species of bat

The Palawan fruit bat (Acerodon leucotis), also known as the Palawan flying fox, is a species of megabat found in forests of Palawan, Balabac and Busuanga in the Philippines. It is listed as vulnerable by the IUCN and is declining due to hunting and habitat loss.

== Physical description ==
The Palawan fruit bats have a head-and-body length of 22–25 cm (8.7–9.8 in), with a forearm length of 13–16.5 cm (5.1–6.5 in). They lack a tail. The fur and wings are brown; the latter sometimes mottled with paler splotches.

== Behavior and ecology ==
Like almost all megabats, the Palawan fruit bat is nocturnal. Unlike many of its relatives, this species does not form large, conspicuous roosts. It likely feeds on fruits such as figs. It can reach an age of at least 5 years.

== Conservation status ==
This species has been listed on Appendix II of CITES since 1990 and is considered vulnerable by the IUCN. The major threats are hunting and habitat loss. It is expected that much of its remaining forest habitat will be converted into plantations in the future. Since it does not form large colonies and roosting sites are inconspicuous, it has proven hard to find appropriate survey methods for precisely determining its status, but it is believed to have declined by more than 30% over the last 15 years.
