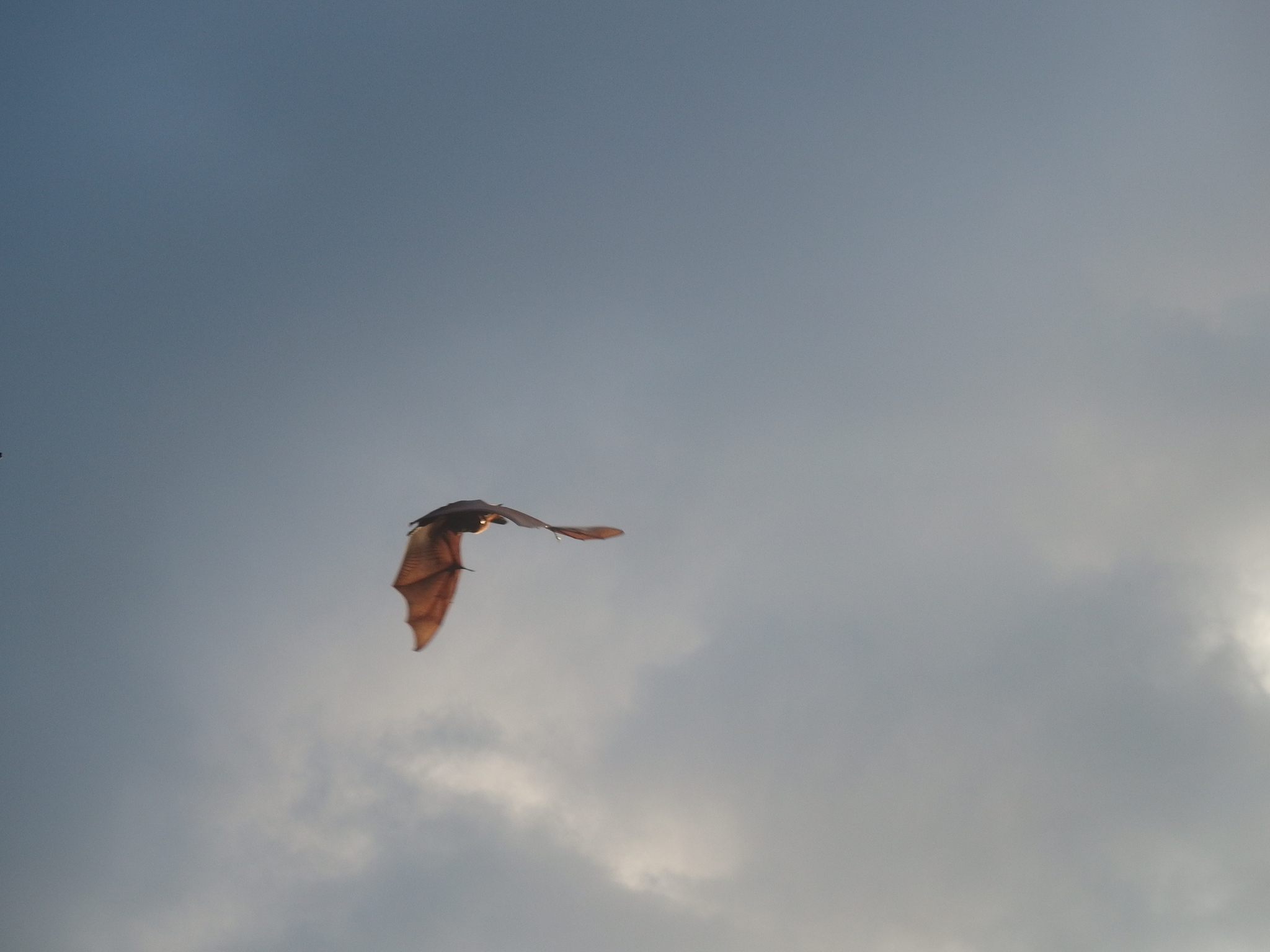

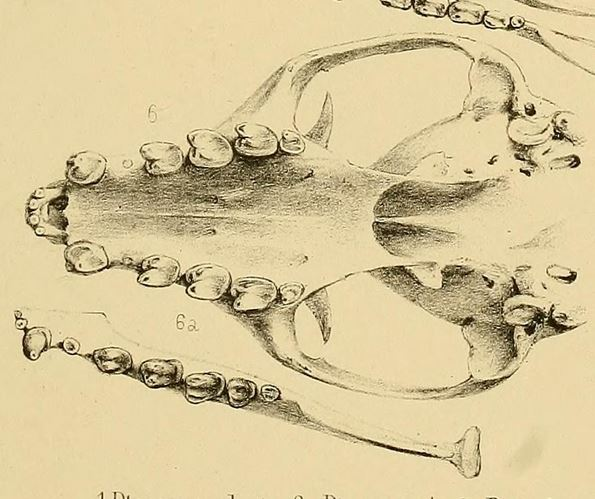

Conservation status
- Vulnerable (IUCN 3.1)
- CITES Appendix II (CITES)

Scientific classification
- Kingdom: Animalia
- Phylum: Chordata
- Class: Mammalia
- Order: Chiroptera
- Family: Pteropodidae
- Genus: Acerodon
- Species: A. mackloti

Binomial name
- Acerodon mackloti (Temminck, 1837)
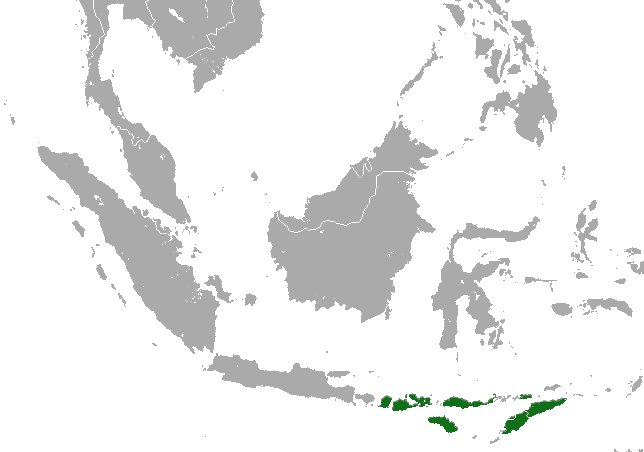
- Sunda flying fox range

Synonyms
- Acerodon macklotii

= Sunda flying fox =

Species of bat

The Sunda flying fox or Sunda fruit bat (Acerodon mackloti) is a species of bat in the family Pteropodidae. It is endemic to Indonesia and Timor-Leste. The Sunda flying fox is categorized by the IUCN as a Vulnerable species, meaning that it has an Intermediate chance of becoming an endangered species due to the deforestation of mangrove trees for shrimp aquaculture.
