= The Bagman Stories =

Radio play series by Ruth Park and D'arcy Niland

The Bagman Stories is a series of Australian radio plays by Ruth Park and D'arcy Niland that originally aired between 1943 and 1948 on the ABC. They were narrated by swagman who tells stories he has collected during his time on the road. Each radio play went for 60 minutes included four mystery or ghost stories.

The first in the series was Night Tales of a Bagman. It was very popular and helped launch Park and Niland as radio writers. "All human beings like uncanny stories," wrote Park later. "By accident he had happened on a most successful idea." She getting ideas "was no problem for us", basing them on old stories their relatives had told them.

Night Tales of a Bagman was followed by:

- The Bagman Tells Another (1944)
- The Bagman Camps Again (1945)
- The Bagman Boils His Billy (1946)
- The Bagman Takes it Easy (1948)

The stories would be regularly repeated and also sold to BBC. According to Park, some of the stories were sold overseas and adapted for television. She credited Leslie Rees with helping her and Niland understand the radio form.

The stories were serialized again in 1957 under the title Tales of a Bagman starting December 16 and broadcast each Monday to Thursday at 6.45 p.m. for 15 minute episodes.

== Night Tales of a Bagman (10 April 1943) ==
This originally aired in 1943. It was produced again in August 1944 and 1946.

== The Bagman on the Wallaby (8 March 1944) ==
Stories:

- The Man With the Two Shadows
- The Swamp
- The Green Lizard
- The Phantom Shearer

The series was produced again in February 1945.

== The Bagman Tells Another (14 December 1944) ==
- The Miners
- The Call
- The Face
- The Joss House

The plays were performed again in February and April 1945.

== The Bagman Camps Again (26 July 1945) ==
The Bagman Camps Again aired in July 1945 and was performed again in April 1954.

Reviewing the latter, Geoffrey Thomas of ABC Weekly said "of these four tales the best were of the outback postman and the letter that would not be delivered to the wrong address, and of the stone man standing upright on the bottom of the sea. They were true mysteries, whereas the others turned out to be merely murder... I hope the bagman will camp again and discover to us more of the queer and hoary wisdom of this land. The tales might be better still if the bagman himself could be a little less sentimental about them. "

=== The Outback Postman ===
A letter insists on being delivered to the right house in order to save a man from suicide.

==== Cast of 1954 Production ====
- Bagman - Howard Smith
- Bert - Bill Akers
- Comet - Stewart Ginn
- First Man - Rex Holland
- Second Man - Arthur Pay
- Third Man - Colin Crane
- Woman - June Bennett
- Flip - Barry Gordon
- Florrie - June Brown

=== The Terrified Woman ===
A drunken swagman stumbles on a murder committed in a fit of insanity.

==== Cast of 1954 production ====
- Bagman - Howard Smith
- Stumpy - Douglas Kelly
- Constable - Sydney Hollister
- First Woman - June Bennett
- Man - Rex Holland
- Sergeant - Frank Gatlift
- Second Woman - Patricia Kennedy

=== The Stone Man ===
A curious revenge is taken by a fossil man on the floor of a bay

==== Cast of 1954 Production ====
- Bagman - Howard Smith
- Eddie - Colin Crane
- Mickey - Stewart Ginn
- Old Man - Arthur Pay
- The Lighthouse
- Bagman - Howard Smith
- Kathie - Marcia Hart
- Leo - Frank Gatlift
- First and Second Voice, Mills - Douglas Kelly

=== The Lighthouse ===
A tale of haunting.

== The Bagman Boils His Billy (11 July 1946) ==
Starring George Hewlett as the bagman.

- The Siding
- The Blurry Man
- The Fugitive
- Morgan’s Mate.

== The Bagman Takes it Easy (1 May 1948) ==
- The Vanishing Man
- The Women at the Nine-mile
- The Clock
- The Gum-climbers
