= Stephen Kearney (actor) =

Australian actor

- Occupation: Actor
- Notable work: Los Trios Ringbarkus

Stephen Kearney is an Australian actor and comedian. He was one half of Los Trios Ringbarkus and starred in the films Rikky and Pete, Garbo and The Nutt House.

Kearney was half of the comedy duo Los Trios Ringbarkus with Neil Gladwin. The pair performed together for over a decade and toured internationally. While still with that act he played the title role of Pete in 1988s Rikky and Pete. In 1992s Garbo he stars as Steve, alongside his comedy duo partner Gladwin, as one of a pair of garbage collectors. He played a pair of twins in The Nutt House which "sat on the shelf" for a few years before getting a domestic release on video in 1995.

On stage Kearney played the role of Monk O'Neil in the 1984 Playbox Theatre Company presentation of A Stretch of the Imagination and Brad in the 1992 Australian tour of The Rocky Horror Show.

Kearney has also appeared in guest roles in TV series Friends, JAG, Thirtysomething and Ned and Stacey.
