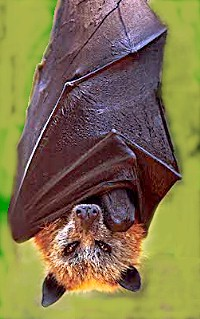
- Giant golden-crowned flying fox (Acerodon jubatus)

Scientific classification
- Kingdom: Animalia
- Phylum: Chordata
- Class: Mammalia
- Order: Chiroptera
- Family: Pteropodidae
- Subfamily: Pteropodinae
- Genus: Acerodon; Jourdan, 1837

Type species
- Pteropus jubatus Eschscholtz, 1831

Species
- A. celebensis A. humilis A. jubatus A. leucotis A. mackloti

= Acerodon =

Genus of bats

Acerodon (meaning: sharp-tooth) is a genus of bats in the family Pteropodidae containing five species, all native to forests in Southeast Asia, and all considered threatened. They are closely related to Pteropus. These bats are considered herbivores (frugivore) and feed on leaves and fruits. They can usually be found in a tropical forest or in a swamp-like wetland.

== Species ==
Genus Acerodon

- Sulawesi flying fox, A. celebensis
- Talaud flying fox, A. humilis
- Giant golden-crowned flying fox, A. jubatus
- Palawan fruit bat, A. leucotis
- Sunda flying fox, A. mackloti
