= No Decision (film) =

No Decision is an Australian television play by Ruth Park and D'Arcy Niland.

It was commissioned by Australia's ATN-7 in 1959 but they decided not to produce it. The writers then won in a writing competition in England. It was filmed for British TV in 1962 with a cast including Leo McKern and John Meillon.
