= I'll Meet You in Botany Bay =

1945 radio play

- ABC Weekly 16 March 1946
- Genre: drama play
- Running time: 45 mins (9:45 pm – 10:30 pm)
- Country of origin: Australia
- Language: English
- Syndicates: ABC
- Written by: Ruth Park
- Directed by: John Cairns
- Original release: 26 January 1945

I'll Meet You in Botany Bay is a 1945 radio play by Ruth Park about Governor Arthur Phillip based on original documents and letters.

It debuted on Australia Day.

== Background ==
According to ABC Weekly the play "is a picture of a lonely man without obvious charm, who pulsed with visionary idealism; a man who, when he retired to fashionable Bath, in England, hungered humanly enough for some recognition of his achievements, but was denied it even by romantic schoolboys."

The play was popular. It was repeated later that year and broadcast again in 1946.

The play was one of a series of radio dramas by Park about European exploration of Australia, others being Stormy Was the Weather (on James Cook) and Early in the Morning (on Abel Tasman). According to Leslie Rees these plays:

Formed an eloquent and fine-tempered reverse sequence bearing on the theme of discovery. They combined the presentation of factual incidents with a keen imaginative perception of character under stress, an ironical feeling for the forlornness, anguish or disillusionment of persons born to a place in history, an appreciation of pioneering courage and achievement set against the failure of private life to fulfil its expectations. These plays had the salt tang of the sea, the roll or pitch of wooden ships breasting through uncharted waters, as well as vivid or bitter personal emotions."
