= William Dampier =

English explorer, pirate, privateer and naturalist (1651–1715)

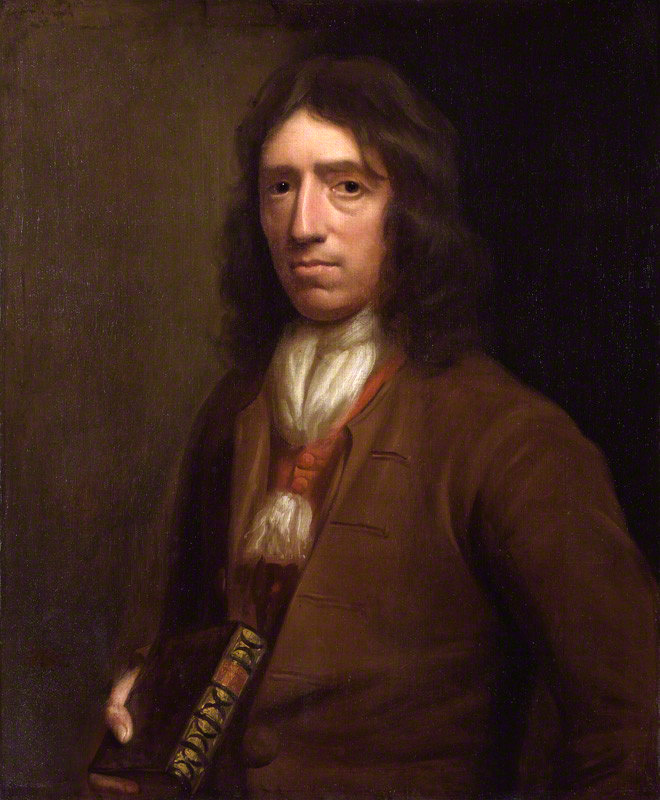
- Portrait by Thomas Murray, c. 1697–1698
- Born: 1651; East Coker, Somerset
- Died: March 1715 (aged 63); London, England
- Occupations: Privateer and explorer
- Known for: Exploring and mapping Australia, Circumnavigation
- Spouse: Judith Dampier

William Dampier (August 1651 – March 1715) was an English explorer, pirate, privateer and naturalist who became the first Englishman to explore parts of what is today Australia, and the first person to circumnavigate the world three times. He has also been described as Australia's first natural historian, as well as one of the most important British explorers of the period between the 16th-century explorer Sir Francis Drake and the 18th-century explorer James Cook; he "bridged those two eras" with a mix of piratical derring-do of the former and scientific inquiry of the latter.

Dampier's expeditions were among the first to identify and name a number of plants, animals, foods and cooking techniques for a European audience, being among the first English writers to use words such as avocado, barbecue and chopsticks. In describing the preparation of avocados, he was the first European to describe the making of guacamole, named the breadfruit plant, and made frequent documentation of the taste of numerous foods foreign to the European palate at the time, such as flamingo and manatee.

After impressing the Admiralty with his book A New Voyage Round the World, Dampier was given command of a Royal Navy ship and made important discoveries in western Australia, before being court-martialed for cruelty. On a later voyage he rescued Alexander Selkirk, a former crewmate who may have inspired Daniel Defoe's Robinson Crusoe. Others influenced by Dampier include George Anson, James Cook, Horatio Nelson, Charles Darwin, and Alfred Russel Wallace.

== Early life ==
William Dampier was born at Hymerford House in East Coker, Somerset, in 1651. He was baptised on 5 September, but his precise date of birth is not recorded. He was educated at King's School, Bruton. Dampier sailed on two merchant voyages to Newfoundland and Java before joining the Royal Navy in 1673. He took part in the two Battles of Schooneveld in June of that year.

Dampier's service was cut short by a catastrophic illness, and he returned to England for several months of recuperation. For the next several years he tried his hand at various careers, including plantation management in Jamaica and logging in Mexico, before he eventually joined another sailing expedition. Returning to England, he married Judith around 1679, only to leave for the sea a few months later.

== First circumnavigation ==
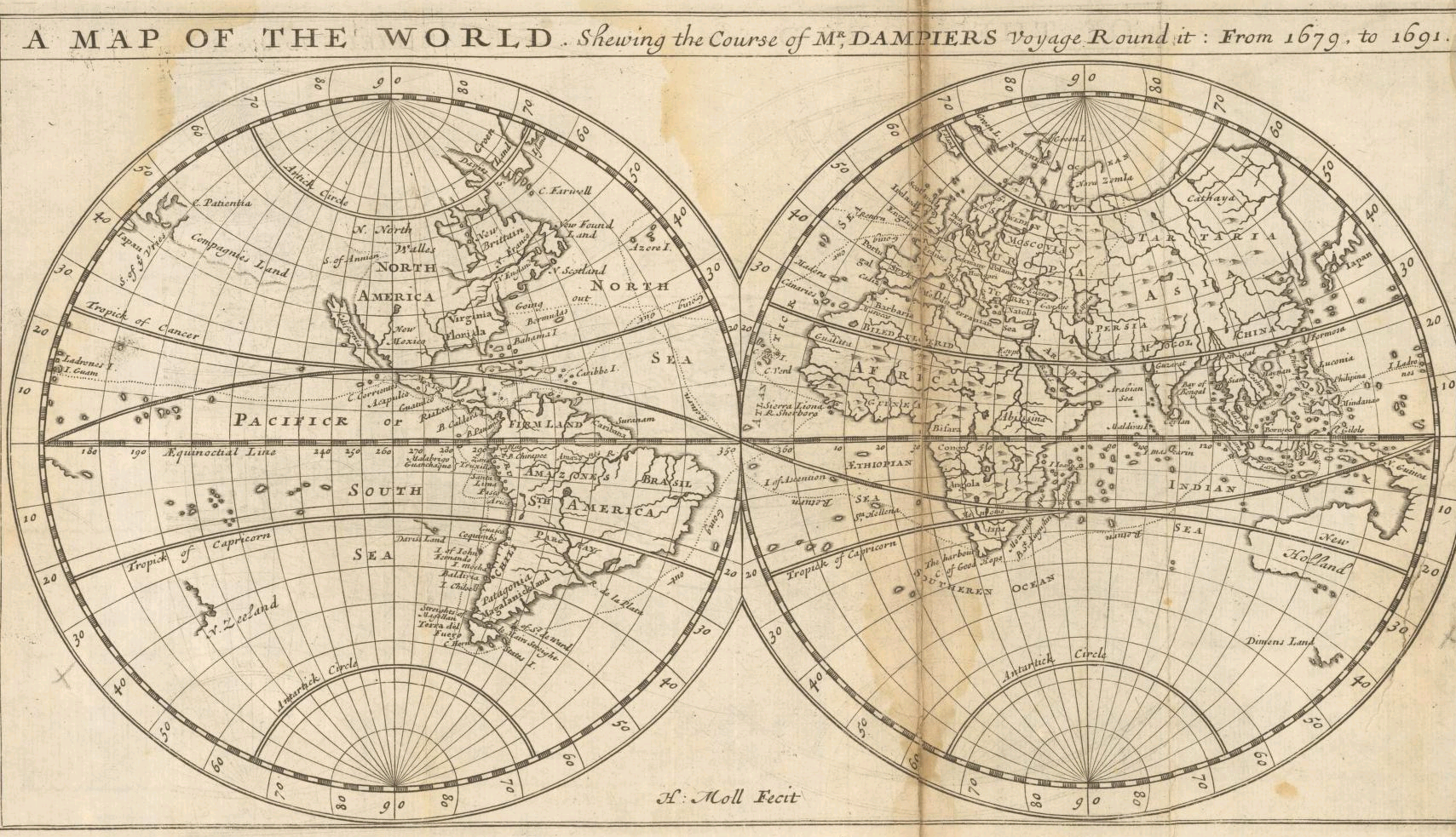
The map of Dampier's voyage produced by Herman Moll (1697)

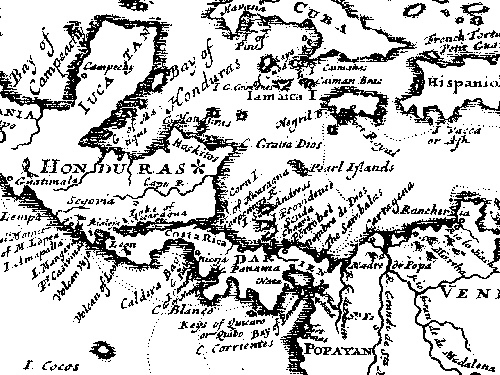
Map from Dampier's 1697 A New Voyage Round the World, with a star marking the "Miskito" coast

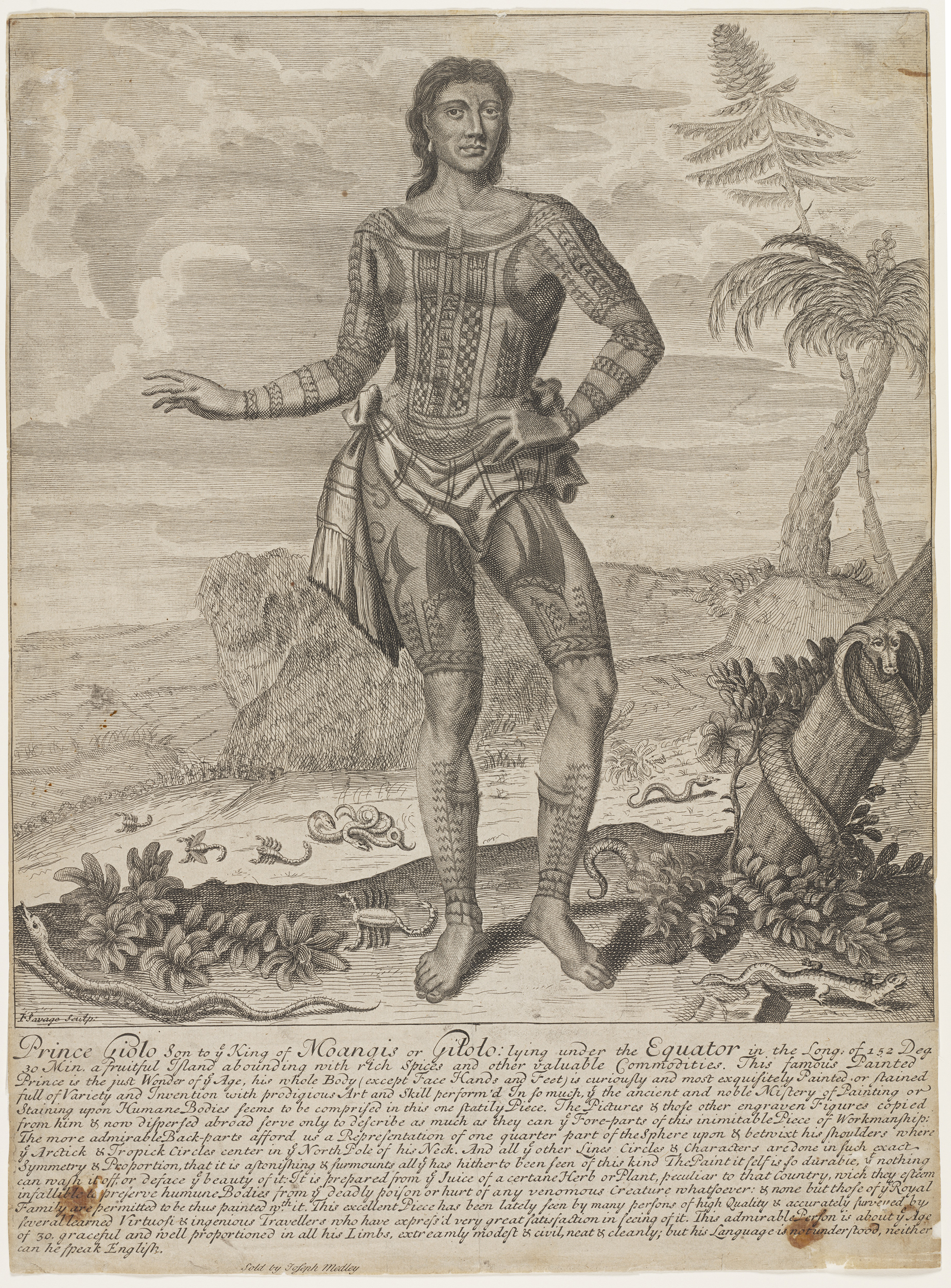
Giolo (Jeoly) of Miangas, who became a slave in Mindanao, and bought by William Dampier together with Jeoly's mother, who died at sea. Jeoly was exhibited in London in 1691 to large crowds as a sideshow, until he died of smallpox three months later.

In 1679, Dampier joined the crew of the buccaneer (pirate) Captain Bartholomew Sharp on the Spanish Main of Central America, twice visiting the Bay of Campeche, or "Campeachy" as it was then known, on the north coast of Mexico. This led to his first circumnavigation, during which he accompanied a raid across the Isthmus of Darién in Panama and took part in the capture of Spanish ships on the Pacific coast of that isthmus. The pirates then raided Spanish settlements in Peru, with diminishing returns over time as the Spanish became aware of their presence. After a failed raid on the city of Arica, a group of the buccaneers, Dampier included, left the group in April 1681 and re-crossed the Isthmus of Darién. The remainder of the expedition continued on and rounded Cape Horn in November of the same year.

Dampier made his way to Virginia, where in 1683 he was engaged by the privateer John Cooke. Cooke entered the Pacific via Cape Horn and spent a year raiding Spanish possessions in Peru, the Galápagos Islands, and Mexico. This expedition collected buccaneers and ships as it went along, at one time having a fleet of ten vessels. Ambrose Cowley, one of the buccaneers who later wrote an account of his own circumnavigation, produced the first maps of the Galápagos during this period. Cooke died in Mexico, and a new leader, Edward Davis, was elected captain by the crew, taking the ship Batchelor's Delight, with future Captain George Raynor in the crew.

Dampier transferred to the privateer Charles Swan's ship, Cygnet, and on 31 March 1686 they set out across the Pacific to raid the East Indies, calling at Guam and Mindanao in the Philippines. Spanish witnesses saw the predominantly English crew as not only pirates and heretics but also cannibals. Leaving Swan and 36 others behind on Mindanao, the rest of the privateers under new Captain John Read sailed on to Manila, Poulo Condor in modern-day Vietnam, China, the Spice Islands, and New Holland (Australia). Contrary to Dampier's later claim that he had not actively participated in actual piratical attacks during this voyage, he was in fact selected in 1687 to command one of the Spanish ships captured by Cygnet's crew off Manila.

On 5 January 1688, Cygnet "anchored two miles from shore in 29 fathoms" on the northwest coast of Australia, near King Sound. Dampier and his ship remained there until 12 March, and while the ship was being careened Dampier made notes on the fauna and flora and the indigenous peoples he found there. Dampier wrote that Aboriginal Australians were the "miserablest" people he had ever seen who "differ but little from brutes." Among his fellows were a significant number of Spanish sailors, most notably Alonso Ramírez, a native of San Juan, Puerto Rico; Ramírez would later be released after being imprisoned by another pirate, Duncan Mackintosh. Later that year, by agreement, Dampier and two shipmates were marooned on one of the Nicobar Islands. They obtained a small canoe which they modified after first capsizing and then, after surviving a great storm at sea, called at "Acheen" (Aceh) in Sumatra.

Dampier returned to England in 1691 via the Cape of Good Hope, penniless, with his only possessions being his journals and a tattooed slave known as Jeoly. Originally from Miangas, Jeoly and his mother were captured by slave traders and brought to Mindanao. They were bought for sixty dollars by one Mister Moody, who later passed on ownership to Dampier. When his mother died, Jeoly was inconsolable and wrapped himself in his dead mother's clothes. Dampier claimed in his diaries that he became close with Jeoly, however, eager to recoup the money he lost while at sea, he sold Jeoly to the Blue Boar Inn on Fleet Street. Jeoly was exhibited as a "prince" to large crowds until he died of smallpox three months later. Numerous false stories about the tattooed foreigner were afterwards written, including his title as "Prince Giolo".

== Roebuck expedition ==
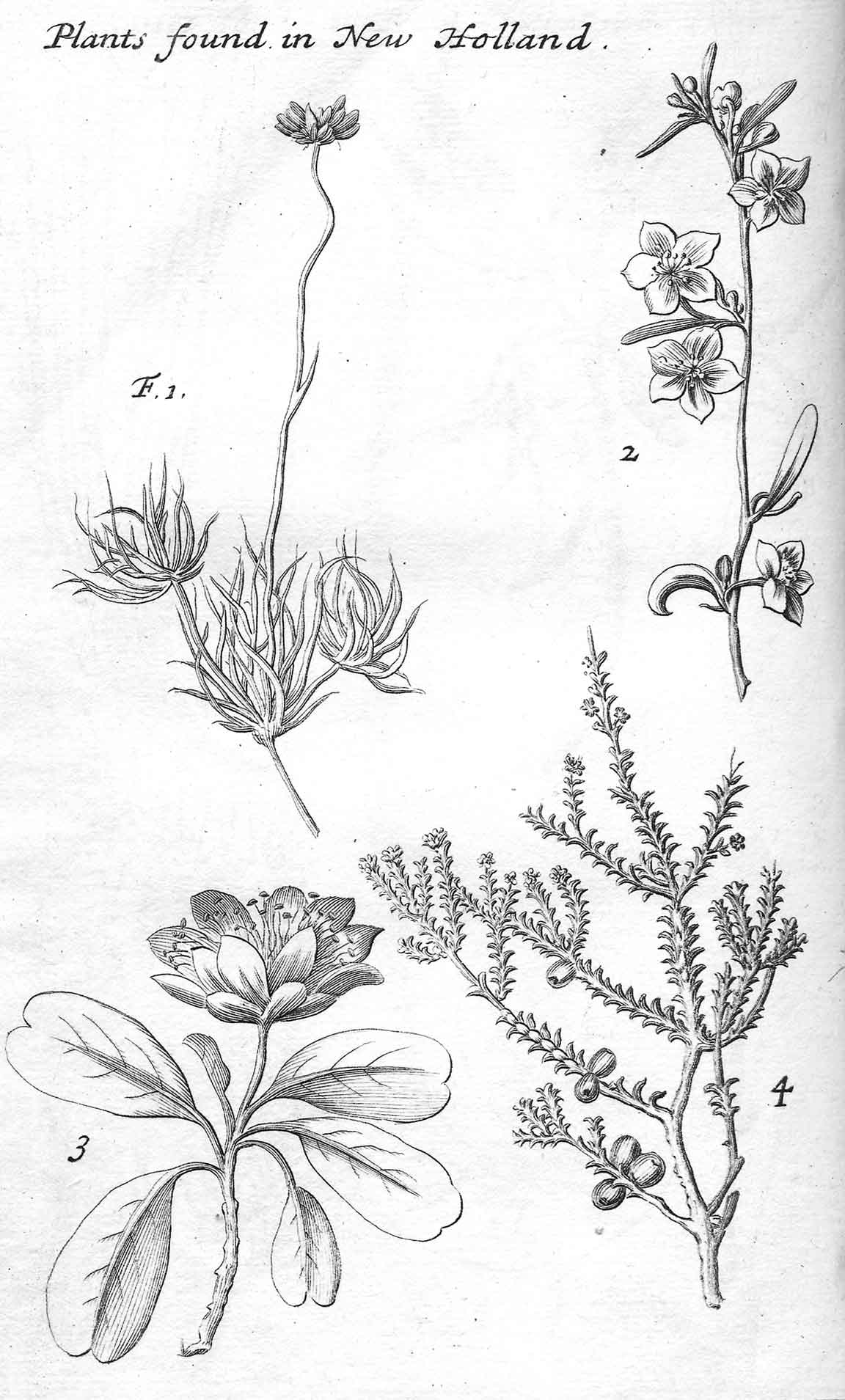
Australian plant life from Dampier's A Voyage to New Holland, published in 1703

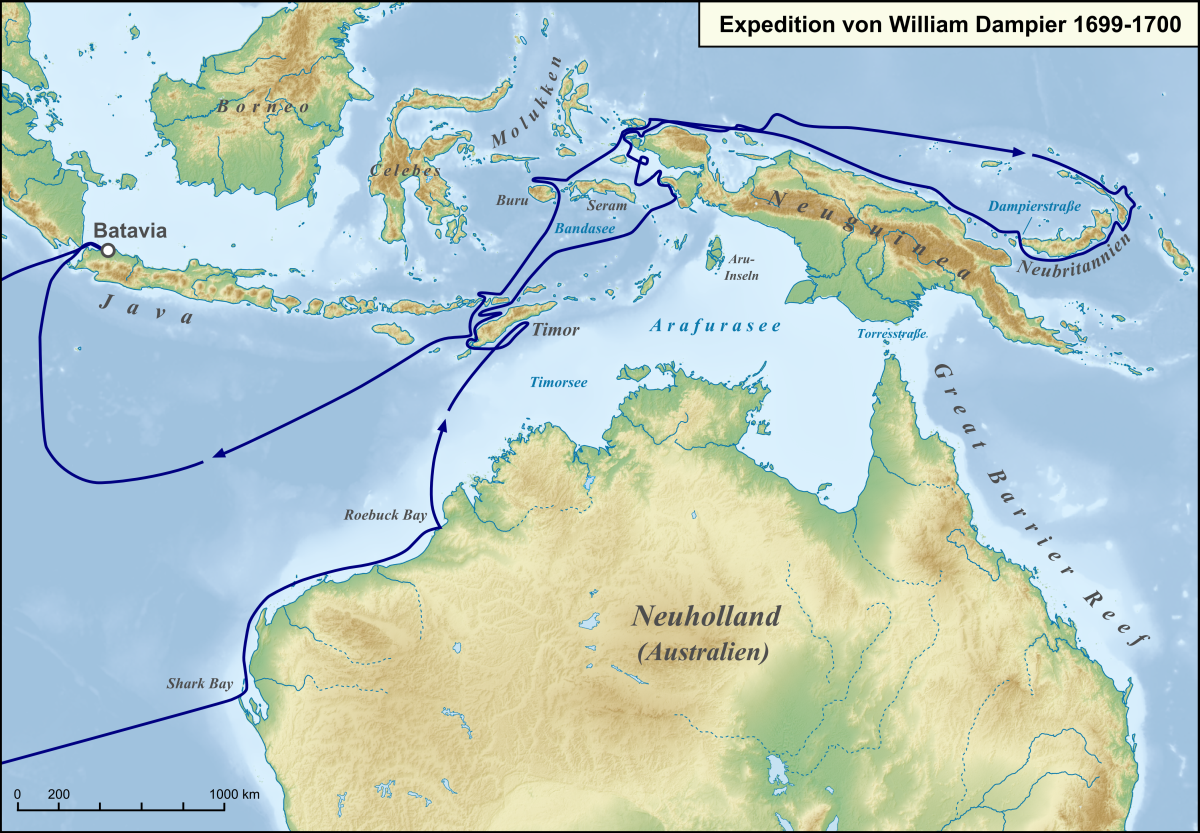
Voyage of the Roebuck (map in German)

The publication of the book, A New Voyage Round the World, in 1697 was a popular sensation, creating interest at the Admiralty. In 1699, Dampier was given command of the 26-gun warship HMS Roebuck, with a commission from King William III (who had ruled jointly with Queen Mary II until her death in 1694). His mission was to explore the east coast of New Holland, the name given by the Dutch to what is now Australia, and Dampier's intention was to travel there via Cape Horn.

The expedition set out on 14 January 1699, too late in the season to attempt the Horn, so it headed to New Holland via the Cape of Good Hope instead. Following the Dutch route to the Indies, Dampier passed between Dirk Hartog Island and the Western Australian mainland into what he called Shark Bay on 6 August 1699. He landed and began producing the first known detailed record of Australian flora and fauna. The botanical drawings that were made are believed to be by his clerk, James Brand. Dampier then followed the coast north-east, reaching the Dampier Archipelago and Lagrange Bay, just south of what is now called Roebuck Bay, all the while recording and collecting specimens, including many shells. From there he bore northward for Timor. Then he sailed east and on 3 December 1699 rounded New Guinea, which he passed to the north. He traced the south-eastern coasts of New Hanover, New Ireland, and New Britain, charting the Dampier Strait between these islands (now the Bismarck Archipelago) and New Guinea. En route, he paused to collect specimens such as giant clams.

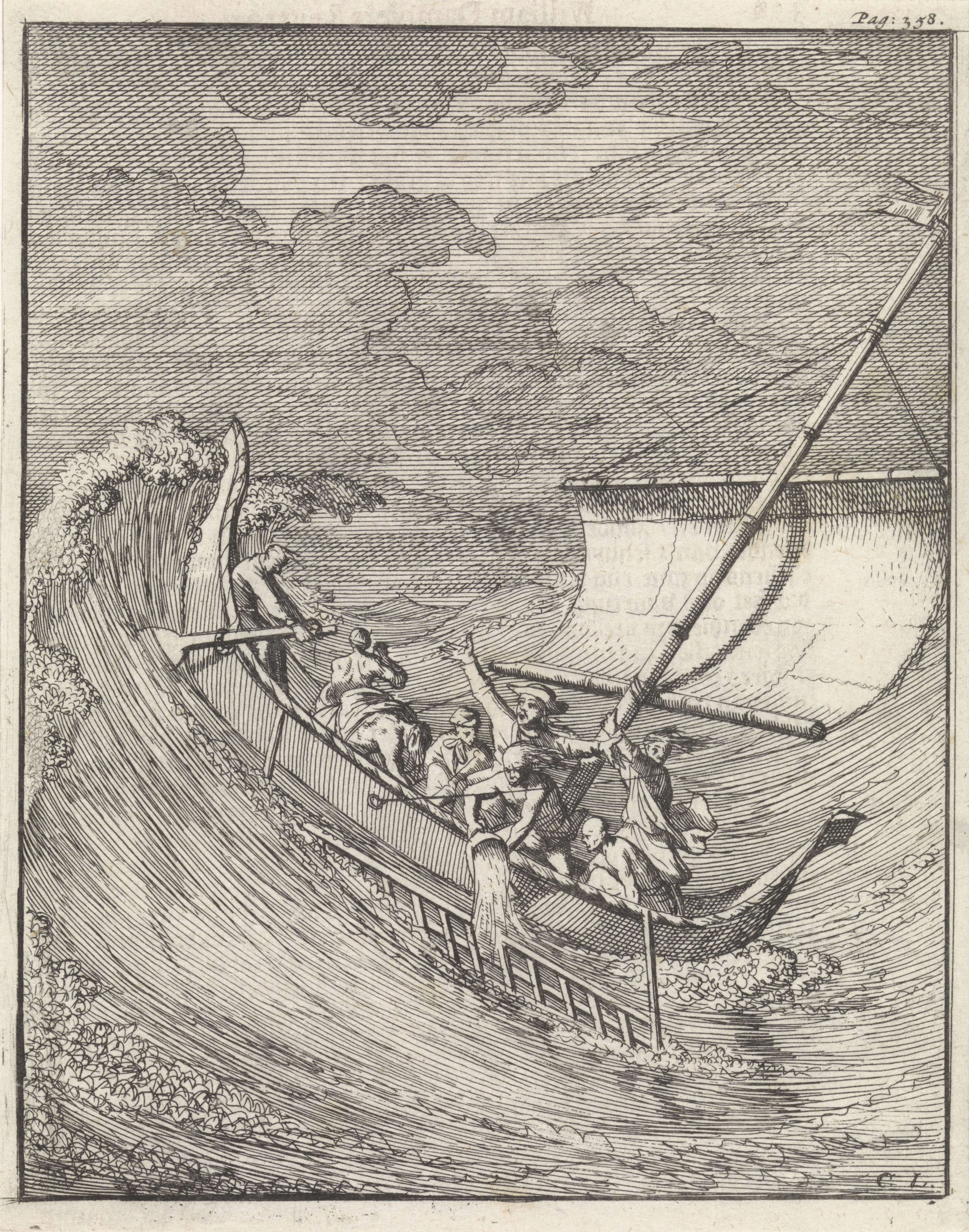
Engraving of Dampier's encounter with the storm off Aceh, in modern-day Indonesia, by Caspar Luyken

By this time, Roebuck was in such bad condition that Dampier was forced to abandon his plan to examine the east coast of New Holland while less than a hundred miles from it. In danger of sinking, he attempted to make the return voyage to England, but the ship foundered at Ascension Island on 21 February 1701. While anchored offshore the ship began to take on more water and the carpenter could do nothing with the worm-eaten planking. As a result, the vessel had to be run aground. Dampier's crew was marooned there for five weeks before being picked up on 3 April by an East Indiaman and returned home in August 1701.

Although many papers were lost with Roebuck, Dampier was able to save some new charts of coastlines, and his record of trade winds and currents in the seas around Australia and New Guinea. He also preserved a few of his specimens. Many plant specimens were donated to the Fielding-Druce Herbarium (part of the University of Oxford), and in September 1999, they were then loaned to Western Australia for the 300 year celebration. In 2001, the Roebuck wreck was located in Clarence Bay, Ascension Island, by a team from the Western Australian Maritime Museum. Because of his widespread influence, and also because so little exists that can now be linked to him, it has been argued that the remains of his ship and the objects still at the site on Ascension Island – while the property of Britain and subject to the island government's management – are actually the shared maritime heritage of those parts of the world first visited or described by him. His account of the expedition was published as A Voyage to New Holland in 1703.

== Court martial ==
On his return from the Roebuck expedition, Dampier was court-martialled for cruelty. On the outward voyage, Dampier had his lieutenant, George Fisher, removed from the ship and jailed in Brazil. Fisher returned to England and complained about his treatment to the Admiralty. Dampier aggressively defended his conduct, but he was found guilty. His pay for the voyage was reduced, and he was dismissed from the Royal Navy.

According to records held at the UK's National Archives, the Royal Navy court martial held on 8 June 1702 involved the following three charges:

1. William Dampier, Captain, HMS Roebuck.
  Crime: Death of John Norwood, boatswain.
  Verdict: Acquitted.
2. William Dampier, Captain, HMS Roebuck.
  Crime: Hard and cruel usage of the lieutenant.
  Verdict: Guilty.
  Sentence: Forfeit all pay due and deemed unfit to command any of His Majesty's ships.
3. George Fisher, Lieutenant, HMS Roebuck
  Crime: Dispute between the captain and the lieutenant.
  Verdict: Acquitted.

== Second circumnavigation ==
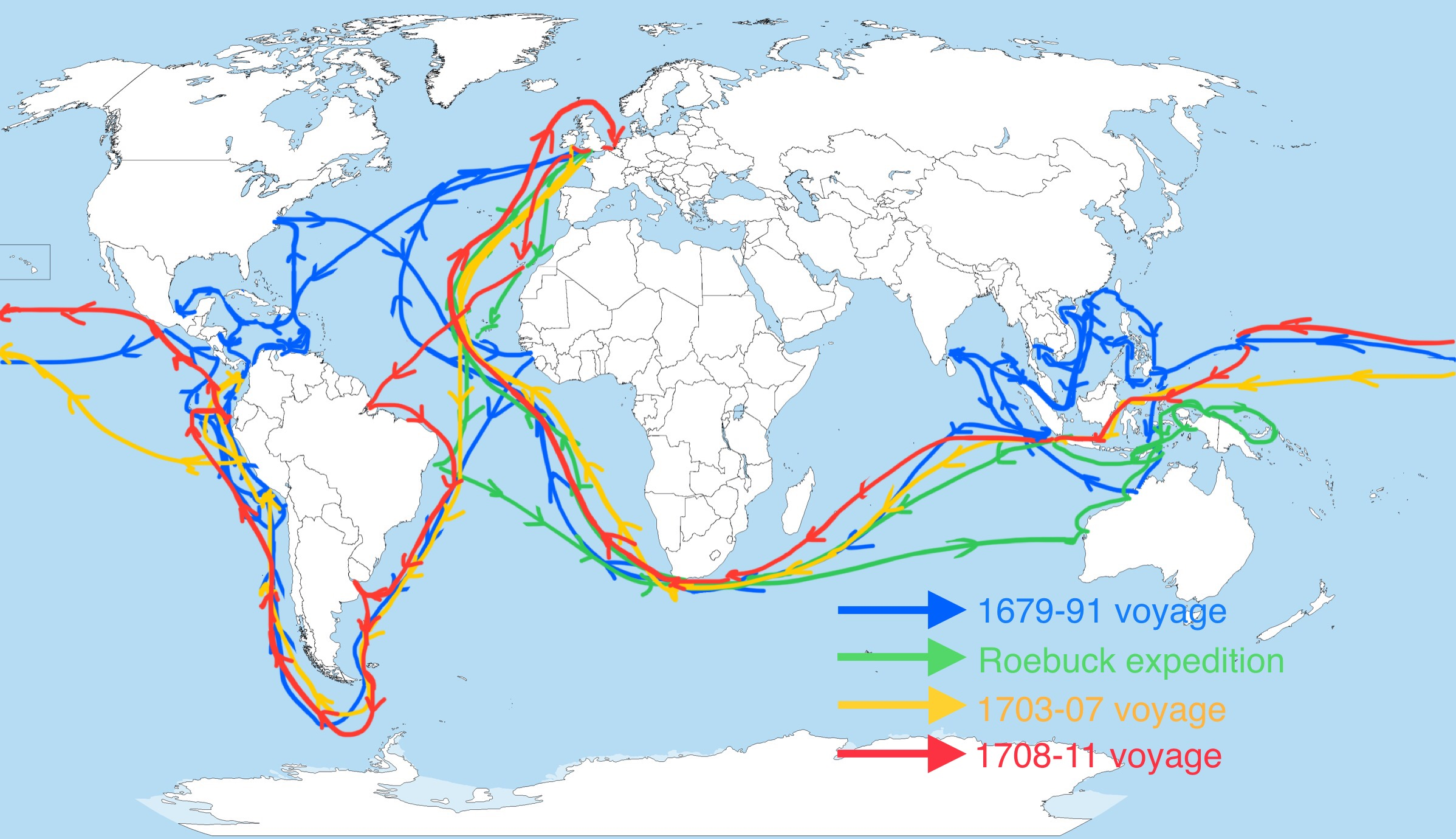
The voyages of William Dampier, depicted on a present-day world map

The War of the Spanish Succession had broken out in 1701, and English privateers were being readied to act against French and Spanish interests. Dampier was appointed commander of the 26-gun ship St George, with a crew of 120 men. They were joined by the 16-gun Cinque Ports with 63 men, and sailed on 11 September 1703 from Kinsale, Ireland. The two ships made a storm-tossed passage round Cape Horn, arriving at the Juan Fernández Islands off the coast of Chile in February 1704. While watering and provisioning there, they sighted a heavily armed French merchantman, which they engaged in a seven-hour battle but were driven off.

Dampier succeeded in capturing a number of small Spanish ships along the coast of Peru, but released them after removing only a fraction of their cargoes because he believed they "would be a hindrance to his greater designs." The greater design he had in mind was a raid on Santa María, a town on the Gulf of Panama rumoured to hold stockpiles of gold from nearby mines. When the force of seamen he led against the town met with unexpectedly strong resistance, however, he withdrew. In May 1704, Cinque Ports separated from the St George and, after putting Alexander Selkirk ashore alone on an island for complaining about the vessel's seaworthiness, sank off the coast of what is today Colombia. Some of its crew survived being shipwrecked but were made prisoners of the Spanish.

It was now left to the St George to make an attempt on the Manila galleon, the main object of the expedition. The ship was sighted on 6 December 1704, probably Nuestra Señora del Rosario. It was caught unprepared and had not run out its guns. But while Dampier and his officers argued over the best way to mount an attack, the galleon got its guns loaded and the battle was joined. The St George soon found itself out-sized by the galleon's 18- and 24-pounders, and, suffering serious damage, they were forced to break off the attack.

The failure to capture the Spanish galleon completed the break-up of the expedition. Dampier, with about thirty men, stayed in the St George, while the rest of the crew took a captured barque across the Pacific to Amboyna in the Dutch settlements. The undermanned and worm-damaged St George had to be abandoned on the coast of Peru. He and his remaining men embarked in a Spanish prize for the East Indies, where they were thrown into prison as pirates by their supposed allies the Dutch but later released. Now without a ship, Dampier made his way back to England at the end of 1707.

== Third circumnavigation and death ==
In 1708, Dampier was engaged to serve on the privateer Duke, not as captain but as pilot. Duke beat its way into the South Pacific Ocean round Cape Horn in consort with a second ship, Duchess. Commanded by Woodes Rogers, this voyage was more successful: Selkirk was rescued on 2 February 1709, and the expedition amassed £147,975 (equivalent to £26.3 million today) worth of plundered goods. Most of that came from the capture of a Spanish galleon, Nuestra Señora de la Encarnación y Desengaño, along the coast of Mexico in December 1709.

In January 1710, Dampier crossed the Pacific in Duke, accompanied by Duchess and two prizes. They stopped at Guam before arriving in Batavia. Following a refit at Horn Island (near Batavia) and the sale of one of their prize ships, they sailed for the Cape of Good Hope where they remained for more than three months awaiting a convoy. They left the Cape in company with English ships, with Dampier now serving as sailing master of Encarnación. After a further delay at the Texel, they dropped anchor at the Thames in London on 14 October 1711.

Dampier may not have lived to receive all of his share of the expedition's gains. He died in the Parish of St Stephen Coleman Street, London. The exact date and circumstances of his death, and his final resting place, are all unknown. He may have been buried in St Stephen’s Church, but the building was destroyed by bombing in 1940, and was not rebuilt. Dampier’s will was proven on 23 March 1715, and it is generally assumed he died earlier that month, but this is not known with any certainty. His estate was almost £2,000 in debt.

== Legacy ==
Dampier influenced several figures better known than he:

- He made important contributions to navigation, collecting for the first time data on currents, winds and tides across all the world's oceans that was used by James Cook and Joseph Banks.
- Jonathan Swift mentions Dampier in his Gulliver's Travels as a mariner comparable to Lemuel Gulliver, and the novel itself occasionally parodies Dampier's travel books as well as other tales of exploration.
- His notes on the fauna and flora of north-western Australia were studied by naturalist and scientist Joseph Banks, who made further studies during the first voyage with James Cook. This helped lead to the naming of and colonisation of Botany Bay and the founding of modern Australia.
- His observations and analysis of natural history helped Alexander von Humboldt and Charles Darwin develop their scientific theories.
- His observations (and those of William Funnell) during his expeditions are mentioned several times by Alfred Russel Wallace in his book The Malay Archipelago, and compared to his own observations made on his 19th-century voyages.
- He is cited over 1,000 times in the Oxford English Dictionary, and is credited over 80 times as the first known example of a word in writing, notably on words such as "barbecue", "avocado", and "subspecies".
- Samuel Taylor Coleridge, who read Dampier's A New Voyage Round the World, called him "a rough sailor, but a man of exquisite mind." Dampier's observations on marine life were among the many sources that Coleridge drew on for inspiration while writing his poem The Rime of the Ancient Mariner.
- He recorded the first English language recipes for guacamole and mango chutney.
- His career in the Asia-Pacific is known for his kidnappings of indigenous peoples, where they were profited on and sold in Europe as slaves and human entertainment
- His life was dramatised in the 1954 Australian radio play Gulliver's Cousin by Ruth Park in which Dampier was originally played by Rod Taylor
- Gabriel García Márquez, winner of the Nobel Prize in Literature, mentions him in his novel "The Autumn of the Patriarch."

== Honours ==
The following geographical places/features are named after William Dampier:

- Dampier, a town and major industrial port in the Pilbara region in the northwest of Western Australia;
- Dampier Creek, Roebuck Bay, Broome, Western Australia;
- Dampier Archipelago, Western Australia;
- Dampier County, a cadastral division of New South Wales;
- Dampier Island, an island of the Dampier Archipelago, Western Australia, renamed Burrup Peninsula in the 1960s when it was connected to the mainland by a causeway;
- Dampier Land District, a cadastral division of Western Australia;
- Dampier Peninsula, Western Australia;
- Dampier Ridge, part of the submerged continent of Zealandia;
- Mount Dampier, the third highest peak in New Zealand;
- Dampier Seamount, off the island of Saint Helena;
- Dampier Strait (Indonesia);
- Dampier Strait (Papua New Guinea);
- the Division of Dampier, an electorate of the Australian House of Representatives from 1913 to 1922;
- the minor planet 14876 Dampier;
- a British frigate/survey ship, HMS Dampier, in service with the Royal Navy between 1948 and 1968; and
- the Australian flowering plant genus Dampiera

Postage stamps bearing his portrait was issued by Australia Post in 1966 and 1985.

== Bibliography ==
Below is a list of books written by William Dampier:

- A New Voyage Round the World (1697)
- Voyages and Descriptions (1699)
- A Voyage to New Holland, &c. in the Year 1699 (1703)
- A Supplement of the Voyage Round the World (1705)
- The Campeachy Voyages (1705)
- A Discourse of Winds (1705)
- Dampier, William (1709). A Continuation of a Voyage to New Holland, etc. in the Year 1699. London: James Knapton. LCCN 2006584510. OL 31757889M. Wikidata Q126680180.
