= Talaud flying fox =

Conservation status
- Endangered (IUCN 3.1)
- CITES Appendix II

Scientific classification
- Kingdom: Animalia
- Phylum: Chordata
- Class: Mammalia
- Order: Chiroptera
- Family: Pteropodidae
- Genus: Acerodon
- Species: A. humilis

Binomial name
- Acerodon humilis K. Andersen, 1909
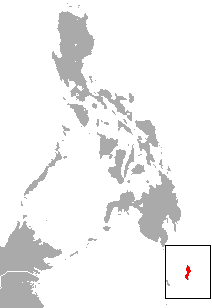
- Talaud flying fox range

Species of bat

The Talaud flying fox or Talaud fruit bat (Acerodon humilis) is a species of bat in the family Pteropodidae. It is endemic to the islands of Salebabu and Karekaleng in the Talaud Archipelago of Indonesia. Its natural habitat is subtropical or tropical swamps.

The first scientific description was by Knud Andersen in an article from 1909.

== Conservation ==
Threats include hunting and habitat loss from logging.
