= Gulliver's Cousin =

1954 Australian radio play by Ruth Park

- Genre: drama play
- Running time: 70 mins (7:30 pm – 8:40 pm)
- Country of origin: Australia
- Language: English
- Starring: Rod Taylor
- Written by: Ruth Park
- Directed by: Ray Menmuir
- Recording studio: Sydney
- Original release: January 25, 1954

Gulliver's Cousin is a 1954 Australian radio play by Ruth Park about William Dampier.

The work debuted in January 1954 with Rod Taylor as Dampier.

The play was recorded again later that year with a different cast.

Dampier had been the subject of a 1951 radio feature from the ABC Our First Englishman.

== Reception ==
Reviewing the first production, ABC Weekly said "it is a tribute to Ruth Park’s writing and to Rodney Taylor’s acting that a clear picture of a fascinating and sympathetic personality emerged from this story of William Dampier and his voyages to Australia, despite a rather over-weighted background of sound effects."

The reviewer from the Daily Telegraph criticised the accents saying "the resulting impression was one of incongruous jauntiness, which, coupled with Miss Park's rather extravagant period dialogue, transformed the drama into something very like historical burlesque."

The Adelaide Mail said "A fine piece of work this, and acted in a manner fitting to such a masterly piece of writing."

== Premise ==
According to ABC Weekly it tells "the voyage during which Captain Swan was marooned on Mindanao Island and the crew ran off with the ship, the Cygnet. Dampier then visited New Holland, which symbolised for him the loneliness of his own life. He deserted the ship and returned to England, where he wrote a book about his travels. This book brought him the first success he had ever had in his life."

== Cast of Sydney 1954 Production ==
- Rodney Taylor as William Dampier
- David Eadie as Defoe
- Queenie Ashton as Mistress Dampier
- Ron Whelan as Coppinger
- Lionel Stevens as Captain Swan
- John Gaudry as Dampier at 16

== Cast of Melbourne 1954 Production ==
- Douglas Kelly as Defoe
- Robert Peach as Dampier
- Lorna Forbes as Mistress Dampier
- Sydney Conabere as First Voice
- Rex Holland as Second Voice
- Harry Starling as Third Voice
- Cyril Gardiner as Coppinger
- Ron Granger as Fox
- John Morgan as Captain
- Bettine Kauffmann as Judith
- David Reid as Spaniard
- Kenrlck Hudson as Reid
- Ron Granger as Hall
- Reginald Wykeham as Swan
