= Imogen Annesley =

Australian actress (born 1970)

- Born: 1969 (age 56–57); London, England, United Kingdom
- Occupation: Actress

Imogen Annesley (born 1969) is an Australian actress and director, who is perhaps best known for her performances in the films Playing Beatie Bow, Howling III: The Marsupials and Garbo, as well as her role of Justine Stevens in the television soap opera Families.

== Early life ==
Annesley was born in 1969 in London, England. She moved to Australia with her family when she was 8 years old. She became interested in acting from a young age and when she was 12 years old she joined the Unley Youth Theatre.

== Career ==
Annesley's early credits were a walk on role in Robbery Under Arms and a 15-minute documentary. She made her feature film debut aged 16 in the leading role of Abigail Kirk in the 1986 Australian film Playing Beatie Bow. Annesley had no formal drama training when she was selected from 200 actresses to play the lead in the time travel drama based on the novel by Ruth Park and directed by Donald Crombie. The film was a failure at the box-office despite a number of positive reviews of the film and Annesley's performance. The film proved more popular on video release.

In April/May 1986, Annesley appeared in the Sydney Theatre Company's production of comedy play The Madras House at the Sydney Opera House. She went on to star in the 1987 Australian werewolf film Howling III: The Marsupials as Jerboa. She also appeared in the miniseries Vietnam. In 1990, Annesley appeared in the Seven Network miniseries Flair as Sally Clarke, sister of the lead character Tessa Clarke (played by Heather Thomas). She was also cast as the "no-nonsense" teenager Justine Stevens in the British daytime soap opera Families.

Ahead of filming the second series of Families, Annesley was hired to replace an injured Tammy MacIntosh in the comedy film Garbo (1992). She was contacted by the casting director shortly after returning to Sydney from the UK. She was cast after attending an audition the following day and was on set in Melbourne a day after that. In 1993, Annesley starred as television presenter Bron in the Universal Theatre production of Below the Belt, a two-hander play about domestic violence between two middle-class professionals. She made a guest appearance in Water Rats in 1997.

Her other television credits include: Farscape, Above the Law, Blue Water High and East of Everything.

She was also an extra in Queen of the Damned.

Annesley is also the lady with the child in the Jimmy Barnes 1987 Australian music video, "I'm Still on Your Side", filmed at Sydney's picturesque Hawkesbury River Train Station.

== Acting credits ==
=== Film ===
Year	Title	Role	Notes
1986	Playing Beatie Bow	Abigail Kirk (lead role)	
1987	Howling III: The Marsupials	Jerboa	
1989	Strapless	Imogen	
1989	Candy Regentag	Sascha	
1991	Sweet Talker	Salesperson	
1992	Garbo	Jane	
1993	The Nostradamus Kid	Beat Girl	
1997	Emmerdale: The Dingles Down Under	Wendy Dingle	Direct-to-video film
2002	Queen of the Damned	Club Vampire	
2007	Cross Life	Zana	

=== Television ===
Year	Title	Role	Notes
1987	Vietnam	Annie Phelan	Episodes: 1.1, 1.5
1987	Future Past	Simone	TV movie
1989	Crossbow (aka William Tell)	Pamenta	Episode: "Doppelgänger"
1989	Countdown Revolution	Herself as Model in London	ABC TV series, 1 episode
1990	Flair	Sally Clarke	TV miniseries
1990	Families	Justine Stevens	Episodes: 1.1, 1.46, 1.55
1997	Water Rats	Jennifer Campbell	Episodes: "Import/Export", "Jilted"
2000	Farscape	Niem	Episodes: "Nerve", "Hidden Memory"
2000	Pizza	Angelina	Episode: "Love Pizza"
2000	Above the Law	Anna King	Episode: "Friendship First"
2000	Tales of the South Seas		Episode: "The Statue"
2002	The Outsider	Bar Girl	TV movie
2005	Blue Water High	Karen Moss	Episode: "Peri Lies Low"
2008–2009	East of Everything	Suzy Barnes	Episodes: 1.1–1.6

=== Theatre ===
Year	Title	Role	Theatre/company
1986	The Madras House	—	Sydney Opera House
1993	Below the Belt	Bron	Crossroads Theatre, Universal Two, Fitzroy
