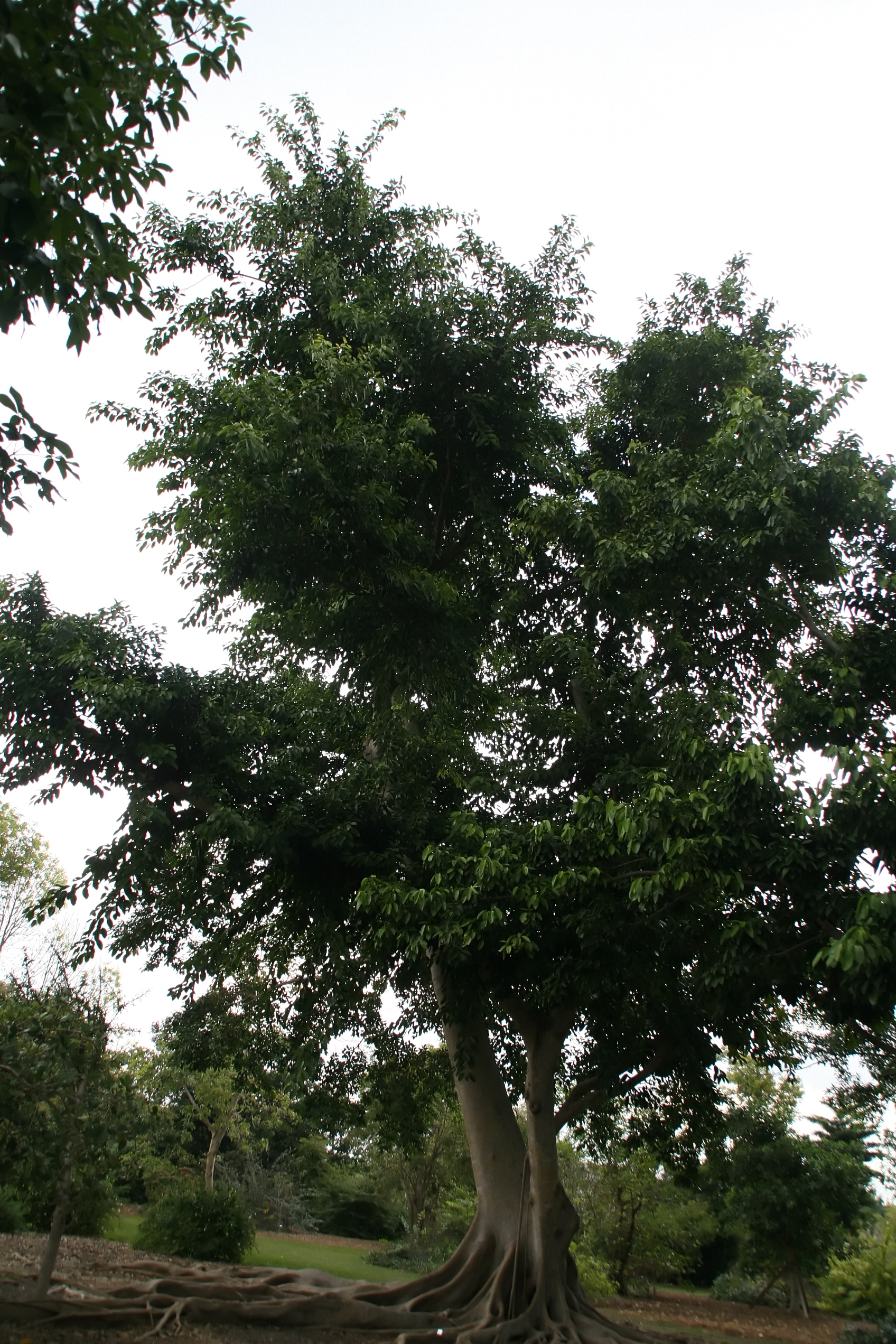

Scientific classification
- Kingdom: Plantae
- Clade: Tracheophytes
- Clade: Angiosperms
- Clade: Eudicots
- Clade: Rosids
- Order: Rosales
- Family: Moraceae
- Tribe: Ficeae
- Genus: Ficus
- Subgenus: F. subg. Urostigma
- Species: F. subcordata

Binomial name
- Ficus subcordata Bl.

Synonyms
- Urostigma subcordatum (Bl.) Miq. Urostigma balicum Miq. Ficus subcordata var. malayana Corner; Ficus polygramma Corner; Ficus garciniifolia Miq. Ficus fairchildii Backer; Ficus calophylloides Elmer; Ficus acrorrhyncha Summerhayes

= Ficus subcordata =

Species of fig

Ficus subcordata is a banyan fig species in the family Moraceae. No subspecies are listed in the Catalogue of Life. The species can be found in Indo-china, Malesia and New Guinea. In Vietnam it may be called sung mù u.
