= Future Past (film) =

- Written by: Michael McGennan
- Directed by: Rob Stewart
- Starring: Nicholas Ryan; Imogen Annesley; John Ley
- Music by: Chris Neal
- Country of origin: Australia
- Original language: English

Production
- Running time: 83 mins
- Production company: Cinefunds Limited

Original release
- Release: 1987

Future Past is a 1987 Australian science-fiction film. It is one of the "Tomorrow's News" series of telemovies made in Australia in the late 1980s by CineFunds Limited, others including Outback Vampires, I've Come About the Suicide, Computer Ghosts, and Hard Knuckle.

== Plot ==
Harlan is a computer whiz kid who works in a video store. He comes into contact with a group from the future, including his own self.

== Cast ==
- Nicholas Ryan as Harlan
- Imogen Annesley as Simone
- John Ley as Billy
- Gary Down as B.L. Keye
- Paul Blackwell as Dave
- Cornelia Frances as Mother
- Doug Scroope as Father
- Cecily Polson as Dymphna
- Paula Duncan as Miss Bernsteen
