= Moya O'Sullivan =

Australian actress

- Moya O'Sullivan, theatre and TV actress
- Born: Moya O'Sullivan MacArthur; 8 June 1926; Melbourne, Australia
- Died: 16 January 2018 (aged 91); Bondi Junction, Australia
- Occupation: Actress
- Years active: c.1950–2012
- Known for: Neighbours as Marlene Kratz

Moya O'Sullivan Macarthur (8 June 1926 – 16 January 2018) was an Australian-born actress who worked both locally and briefly in the United Kingdom. She was best known for her stint as the popular character Marlene Kratz in the soap opera Neighbours between 1994 and 1997.

== Early life ==
O'Sullivan was born to Eugene and Nancy O'Sullivan (née Morgan) and had an older brother, Peter. She was raised in the Sydney suburb of Randwick. Having graduated from school, she was tutored in drama classes under Dorothy Hemingway and started her career as a stage performer in the 1950s with the Mosman Theatre Company.

== Career ==
O'Sullivan trained in radio under Rosalind Kennerdale, and through her, gained agent John Cover, the husband of actress Queenie Ashton, who had a company, Central Casting. She received her first acting role in a Caltex Theatre production of Chance of a Ghost on 2GB and 4BH. O'Sullivan appeared in numerous other radio productions, such as Dr. Paul, When a Girl Marries, Blue Hills, In a Sunburnt Country and Life with Dexter.

With the advent of television, O'Sullivan became a familiar face in televised plays, as well as featuring in television advertisements. She made her debut in 1960 in the ABC production Farewell, Farewell Eugene, and appeared in The Slaughter of St Teresa's Day. She then began appearing in Australian soap operas and serials, beginning in 1961 with the daytime soap The Story of Peter Gray, playing the role of Anne Vail.

In the mid-1960s, O'Sullivan tried her luck in the United Kingdom, where she featured in radio, television and on the West End stage circuit. Notable credits included James Patrick Donleavy's production A Singular Man, in which she played the role of Mrs Martin and Miss Sheily in a 1964 BBC Television of The Harp in the South.

O'Sullivan returned to Australia in 1965, where she featured in the theatrical production Inadmissible Evidence, alongside Anne Haddy. Her television roles included playing Mrs Mason in the 1960s original series of Skippy the Bush Kangaroo, guesting in Homicide and Matlock Police and playing the recurring role of Eileen Vickers in Division 4.

In 1975, O'Sullivan had a three-month stint in the serial Number 96 playing the prominent role of Phyllis Pratt. She then featured in medical soap opera The Young Doctors opposite Paula Duncan and Gwen Plumb, before making guest appearances as Lorna Close in Crawford Productions police drama Cop Shop. Her character was mother to Valerie Close-Johnson (Joanna Lockwood), mother-in-law to Jeffrey Johnson and eventual wife of Eric O'Reilly (Terry Norris).

After leaving Cop Shop in 1982, O'Sullivan featured in Sons and Daughters as Aileen Keegan. She appeared in Patrol Boat, Kingswood Country, 1986 miniseries Whose Baby and had several guest roles in A Country Practice throughout the 1980s. She played Grandma Lois Kelly in Hey Dad..!, and had further guest roles in Bodysurfer, G.P., Water Rats, Home and Away, Blue Heelers and All Saints. From 1992 to 1993, she had a regular role in the Skippy reboot, The Adventures of Skippy, as Thelma Woods.

In 1994, O'Sullivan secured an ongoing role on long-running soap opera Neighbours as Marlene Kratz, bringing her international recognition. Her character was mother to Cheryl Stark (played by Caroline Gillmer) and she shared scenes with Tom Oliver, Richard Grieve and Kimberley Davies. She departed the series in 1997, when her character went on a three month cruise. In 2005, alongside many other former cast members, O'Sullivan reprised the role of Kratz, for a reunion special, commemorating Neighbours' 20th anniversary.

O'Sullivan continued acting throughout the 2000s, with a role in Home & Away in 2002, and several guest appearances in All Saints in 2001 and 2008. She never held any other long-standing roles; remaining a well-recognised guest artist, who often played hapless old grannies in her later years. In 2004, she performed in the stage show Leading Ladies: Off the Cuff alongside Carmen Duncan, Judy Nunn, Rowena Wallace and Justine Saunders.

O'Sullivan's final role was in Tricky Business in 2012. The following year, she was awarded a lifetime achievement award at the Glugs Theatrical Awards.

== Personal life and death ==
O'Sullivan was married to Ben Macarthur until their divorce. She frequently undertook volunteer work, particularly in schools.

O'Sullivan died aged 91 in Bondi Junction, Sydney on 16 January 2018. Her funeral was held at St Joseph's Church in Edgecliff. She was survived by her sister-in-law Kaaren, nephew Mark, nieces Cait and Bridget and two grandchildren.

== Filmography ==
=== Film ===
Year	Title	Role	Type
1965	Never Mention Murder	Theatre Sister	Feature film
1969	Color Me Dead	Maid	Feature film
1982	The Best of Friends	Mrs. Malone	Feature film
1983	Midnite Spares	Caravan Lady	Feature film
1986	Playing Beatie Bow	Granny Tallisker	Feature film
1992	Garbo	Freda	Feature film
1999	Two Hands	Mrs Fletcher	Feature film
2008	The View from Greenhaven	Tottie	Feature film

=== Television ===
Year	Title	Role	Type
1960	Thunder on Sycamore Street		TV movie (episode of The General Motors Hour)
1960	Farewell, Farewell, Eugene		TV movie
1960	The Slaughter of St Teresa's Day	Sister Mary Mark	TV movie
1961	The Story of Peter Grey	Anna Vail	
1963	Jonah	Pompy	Episode "Ship of Fame"
1963	Drama 61-67	Miss Wilson	1 episode
1964	Story Parade	Miss Shelly	1 episode
1964	ITV Play of the Week	Grace Martin	1 episode
1964	The Edgar Wallace Mystery Theatre	Theatre Sister	1 episode
1965	Hugh and I	Herself	
1965	Undermind	Edith Bishop	1 episode
1965–1975	Homicide	Mrs. Watson / Lillian / Rose Murphy / Gwen / Vivienne Sekora / Ruth Gold	6 episodes
1966	Australian Playhouse		2 episodes
1967	You Can't See Round Corners	Guest role	1 episode
1967	Love and War	She	1 episode
1968	Hunter	Miss Corey	1 episode
1969–1974	Division 4	Eileen Vickers	6 episodes
1970	Skippy	Mrs. Mason	1 episode
1970	Delta	Margaret	1 episode
1971; 1973	The Comedy Game		2 episodes
1971	Dead Men Running		Miniseries, 1 episode
1971–1972	Matlock Police	Sarah McKenzie / Nora / Elsie Cummings	3 episodes
1972	A Nice Day at the Office		1 episode
1972	Birds In The Bush	Hotel Receptionist	1 episode
1972	Behind the Legend		1 episode
1974	The Champion		TV movie
1975	Certain Women		1 episode
1975	Number 96	Phyllis Pratt	6 episodes
1977	Say You Want Me	Julie's Mother	TV movie
1977	Going Home		TV movie
1977	The Young Doctors	Eadie Brooks	5 episodes
1977	Hotel Story		1 episode
1978–1981	Cop Shop	Lorna Close/O'Reilly	96 episodes
1979	Ride on Stranger	Ada Jones	Miniseries, 2 episodes
1979	A Place in the World		Miniseries, 1 episode
1981	Daily at Dawn		1 episode
1982	Jonah		Miniseries, 4 episodes
1982	Sons and Daughters	Aileen Keegan	11 episodes
1983	Great Expectations	Voice	Animated TV movie
1983	David Copperfield	Voice	Animated TV movie
1983	Outbreak of Hostilities	Lillian Starling	TV movie
1983–1993	A Country Practice	Daphne Marshall / Gwen Jones / Kath Thompson	6 episodes
1984	Kingswood Country	Errol's Mum	1 episode
1984	A Tale of Two Cities	Voice	Animated TV movie
1985	Flight into Hell		Miniseries
1986	Whose Baby?	Amelia Williams	Miniseries, 2 episodes
1987	Danger Down Under (aka Harris Down Under)	Ethel	TV movie
1987	Olive	Saleslady	TV movie
1987–1991	Hey Dad..!	Grandma Lois Kelly	7 episodes
1988	Richmond Hill	Beatrice White	10 episodes
1988	Hiawatha	Voice	Animated TV movie
1988	Alice in Wonderland	Duchess / Queen of Hearts (voice)	Animated TV movie
1989	The Saint in Australia (aka Fear in Fun Park)	Madge	TV movie
1989	Rafferty's Rules		1 episode
1989	Bodysurfer	Mrs. Mortimer	Miniseries, 2 episodes
1992	The Main Event	Herself	1 episode
1992	The Time Game	Mrs. Brown	TV movie
1992–1993	The New Adventures of Skippy	Thelma Woods	39 episodes
1993	G.P.	Myra Drummond	1 episode
1994–1997; 2005	Neighbours	Marlene Kratz	393 episodes
1995	Neighbours: A 10th Anniversary Celebration	Marlene Kratz (archive footage)	TV special
1998	House Gang	Shopkeeper	1 episode
2000	Water Rats	Denise Ford	1 episode
2001	Flat Chat	Herself	1 episode
2001	Outriders	Mrs. Churchill	4 episodes
2001	Home & Away	Gladys Adams	TV series, 1 episode
2001–2008	All Saints	Grace Belden / Jean Blight / Margaret Milligan	4 episodes
2002	Blue Heelers	Grannie Gibson	1 episode
2002	Don't Blame the Koalas	P & C Lady	1 episode
2012	Tricky Business	Lorraine Webb	Episode "Skyrockets in Flight"

=== Theatre ===
Year	Title	Role	Type	Ref.
1952	Saint Joan		Shavian Playhouse, Sydney	
1952	How He Lied to Her Husband / The Man of Destiny		Shavian Playhouse, Sydney	
1953	Back to Methuselah		Shavian Playhouse, Sydney	
1961	The Women		Independent Theatre, Sydney with J. C. Williamson's	
1961	Period of Adjustment		Independent Theatre, Sydney with J. C. Williamson's	
1961	The Rope Dancers	Mrs Farrow	Independent Theatre, Sydney with J. C. Williamson's	
1963	Talk to the Moon	Florrie Heath	Hampstead Theatre, London	
1964	A Singular Man	Mrs Martin	Cambridge Arts Theatre, Theatre Royal, Brighton, Comedy Theatre, London with Richard Rhys & Spur Productions	
1965	Inadmissable Evidence		UNSW Old Tote Theatre, Sydney	
1966	O'Flaherty V.C.		AMP Theatrette, Sydney with Q Theatre	
1966	A Walk Among the Wheeneys		AMP Theatrette, Sydney with Q Theatre	
1966	Summer of the Seventeenth Doll		AMP Theatrette, Sydney with Q Theatre	
1969	The Women		Independent Theatre, Sydney with J. C. Williamson's	
1972	La Musica		AMP Theatrette, Sydney with Q Theatre	
2004	Leading Ladies: Off the Cuff			

=== Radio ===
Year	Title	Role	Type	Ref.
1957	Chance of a Ghost		Caltex Theatre on 2GB / 4BH	
1958	In a Sunburnt Country	Clare	ABC Radio	
1959	The Guiding Light	Jan Carter	2UW	
2013	Sonic Tales		Season 3, episode 2: "Elegy Delivered in a Country Pub" on Eastside Radio 89.7FM, Sydney	
	Life with Dexter	Jessie	2GB	
	Blue Hills		ABC Radio	
	Dr. Paul			
	When a Girl Marries		2CH	

== Awards ==
Year	Work	Award	Category	Result	Ref.
2013	Moya O'Sullivan	Glugs Theatrical Awards	Lifetime Achievement Award	Honoured	
