= A New Voyage Round the World =

1697 book by William Dampier

A New Voyage Round the World is an autobiographical account by William Dampier of his journeys around the world, written from 1679 to 1691 but first published in 1697. Dampier is believed to have written the account following his return to England, in between further, shorter expeditions he made in later years. Both the initial and subsequent editions of the book were successful. At the behest of his publisher, one later edition, issued in 1699, appended new material entitled: "A Supplement to the Voyage round the World, together with the Voyages to Campeachy and the Discourse on the Trade Winds". Dampier's memoir is "... notable for the frankness of its account of anarchic, mismanaged and largely unsuccessful buccaneering and merchant enterprise."

== Exploration of Australia ==
In England, the most celebrated aspect of the book was his explorations of New Holland, as Australia was known at the time. The work helped bring into public consciousness the notion of a southerly continent.

== Impact on literature ==
The book was also a "major influence on two canonical works of English literature, Jonathan Swift's Gulliver's Travels and Daniel Defoe's Robinson Crusoe". Charles Darwin quotes from Dampier's New Voyage account of the tame behaviour of the "turtle-dove" – the Galápagos dove – that they both encountered on the Galápagos Islands. Darwin notes in his The Voyage of the Beagle: "Dampier ... says that a man in a morning's walk might kill six or seven dozen of these doves."
