= Ruth Park =

New Zealand-born Australian writer (1917–2010)

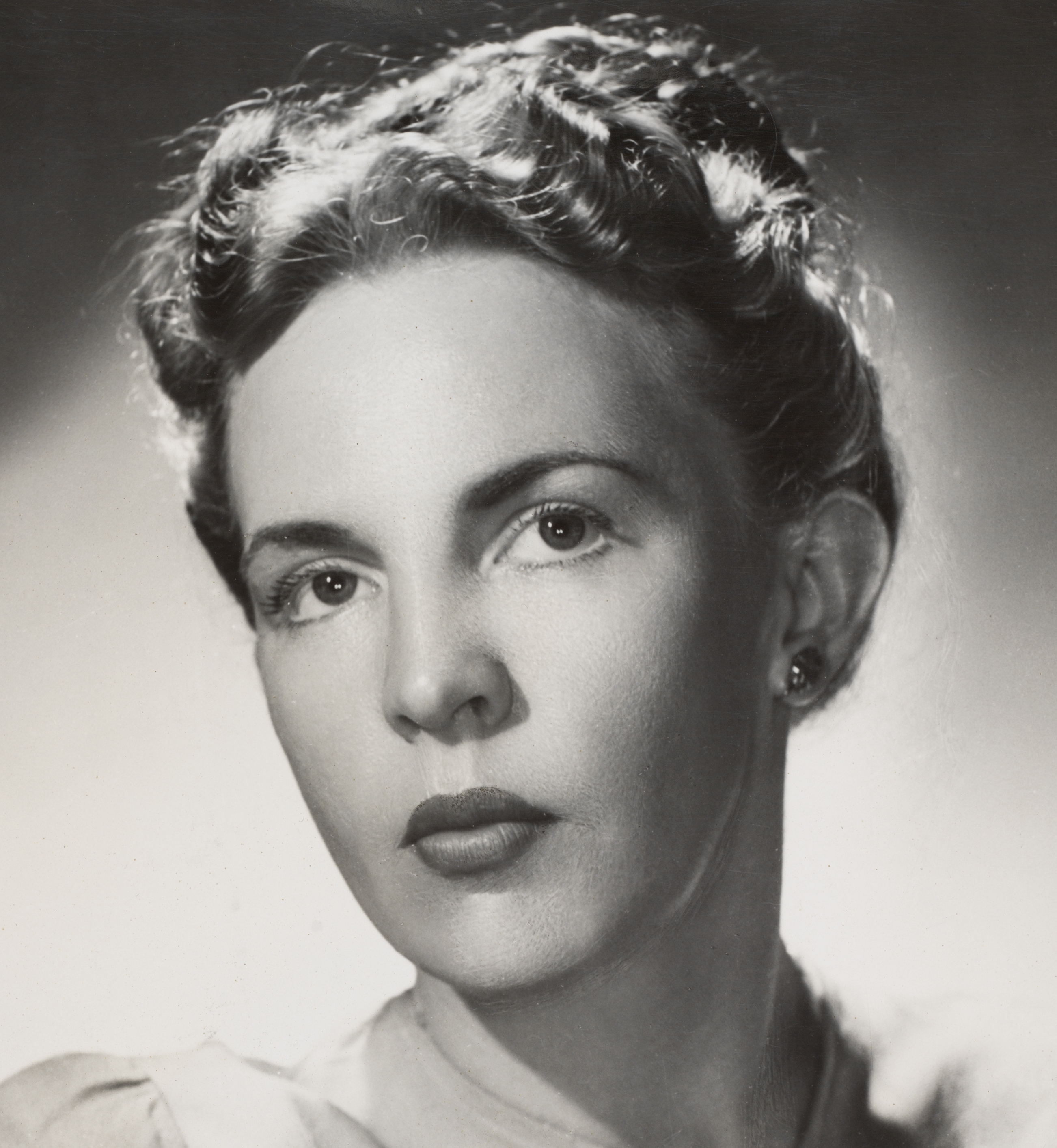
- Ruth Park, c. 1942
- Born: Rosina Ruth Lucia Park; 24 August 1917; Auckland, New Zealand
- Died: 14 December 2010 (aged 93); Sydney, Australia
- Occupations: Author, novelist
- Spouse: D'Arcy Niland
- Writing career
- Language: English
- Notable works: The Harp in the South; Playing Beatie Bow; The Muddle-Headed Wombat
- Notable awards: Miles Franklin Award (1977)

Rosina Ruth Lucia Park AM (24 August 1917 – 14 December 2010) was a New Zealand–born Australian author. Her best known works are the novels The Harp in the South (1948) and Playing Beatie Bow (1980), and the children's radio serial The Muddle-Headed Wombat (1951–1970), which also spawned a book series (1962–1982).

== Personal history ==
Park was born in Auckland to a New Zealand father whose father was Scottish and mother Irish and a New Zealand mother whose father was Swedish and mother was Irish. Her family later moved to the town of Te Kūiti further south in the North Island of New Zealand, where they lived in isolated areas.

During the Great Depression her working-class father laboured on bush roads and bridges, worked as a driver, did government relief work and became a sawmill hand. Finally, he shifted back to Auckland, where he joined the workforce of a municipal council. The family occupied public housing, known in New Zealand as a state house, and money remained a scarce commodity. Ruth Park, after attending St Benedict's School, a Catholic primary school, won a partial scholarship to St Benedict's secondary school, but her high-school education was broken by periods of being unable to afford to attend. Nevertheless, she completed her studies at St Benedict's as Head Girl. She completed an external degree course at Auckland University.

Park's first break as a professional writer came when she was hired by the Auckland Star newspaper as a journalist, but she found the assignments she was given unchallenging. Wishing to expand her horizons, she accepted a job offer from the San Francisco Examiner, but the tightening of United States' entry requirements after the bombing of Pearl Harbor forced a change of plan. Instead, she moved to Sydney, Australia, in 1942, where she had lined up a job with another newspaper.

That same year she married the budding Australian author D'Arcy Niland (1917–1967), with whom she had been corresponding as pen pals for some years, and whom she had finally met on a previous visit to Sydney. There she embarked on a career as a freelance writer. Park and Niland had five children, of whom the youngest, twin daughters Kilmeny and Deborah, went on to become book illustrators. (Park was devastated when Niland died in Sydney at the age of 49 from a heart ailment; Kilmeny also predeceased her — see the Herald obituary.) Park had eleven grandchildren and five great-grandchildren. The writer Rafe Champion is her son-in-law. In addition, D’Arcy Niland's brother Beresford married Ruth Park's sister Jocelyn.

== Writing career ==
When contracted in 1942 by Ida Elizabeth Osbourne to write a serial for the ABC Children's Session, she wrote the series The Wide-awake Bunyip. When the lead actor Albert Collins died suddenly in 1951, she changed its direction and The Muddle-Headed Wombat was born, with first Leonard Teale then John Ewart in the title role. The series ended when the radio program folded in 1970. Such was its popularity that between 1962 and 1982 she wrote a series of children's books about the character.

Her first novel was The Harp in the South (1948) – a graphic story of Irish slum life in Sydney, which has been translated into 37 languages. Even though it was acclaimed by literary critics, the book proved controversial with sections of the public due to its candour, with some newspaper letter-writers calling it a cruel fantasy because as far as they were concerned, there were no slums in Sydney. However, the newly married Park and Niland did live for a time in a Sydney slum located in the rough inner-city suburb of Surry Hills and vouched for the novel's accuracy. It has never been out of print. Sydney slum life recurs in her novel for children, Playing Beatie Bow (1980).

Park built on her initial success with the 1949 publication of a follow-up novel titled the Poor Man's Orange. During the 1950s, despite the demands of raising a family, she wrote tirelessly. According to a 2010 tribute article printed in the Sydney Morning Herald and written by her literary agent Tim Curnow, she produced more than 5,000 radio scripts alone during this decade, as well as contributing numerous articles to newspapers and magazines and penning weightier works of fiction.

She subsequently wrote Missus (1985), a prequel to The Harp in the South, among other novels, and created scripts for film and television. Her autobiographies, A Fence Around the Cuckoo (1992) and Fishing in the Styx (1993), deal with her life in New Zealand and Australia respectively. She also penned a novel set in New Zealand, One-a-pecker, Two-a-pecker (1957), about gold mining in Otago. (It was later renamed The Frost and The Fire.)

Park never remarried. Between 1946 and 2004, she received numerous awards for her contributions to literature in both Australia and internationally. She was made a Member of the Order of Australia in 1987. (Her awards and honours are listed below.)

From 1974 to 1981 Park dwelt on Norfolk Island, where she was the co-owner of a shop selling books and gifts. Her later years, however, were spent living in the Sydney harbourside suburb of Mosman. She died in her sleep on 14 December 2010, at the age of 93.

== Awards ==
- 1946: Inaugural Sydney Morning Herald-sponsored writers' competition: Best Novel award for The Harp in the South (published 1948)
- 1954: Catholic Book Club Choice selected: Serpent's Delight
- 1961: Inaugural Commonwealth Television Play Competition: British award for television play won for No Decision, with D'Arcy Niland
- 1962: Children's Book Council of Australia (CBCA): highly commended for The Hole in the Hill
- 1975: CBCA Children's Book of the Year Award Winners: highly commended for Callie's Castle
- 1977: Miles Franklin Award for Swords and Crowns and Rings
- 1977: National Book Council: highly commended for Swords and Crowns and Rings
- 1979: Children's Book of the Year Award Winners: highly commended for Come Danger, Come Darkness
- 1981: Children's Book of the Year Award Winners: won for Playing Beatie Bow
- 1981: Ethel Turner Prize for Young People's Literature (NSW Premier's Literary Awards): won for When the Wind Changed
- 1982: Parents' Choice Award for Literature: won for Playing Beatie Bow
- 1982: Boston Globe-Horn Book Award: for Playing Beatie Bow
- 1982: International Board on Books for Young People (Australia): Honour Diploma for Playing Beatie Bow
- 1982: Guardian Fiction Prize (UK): runner-up for Playing Beatie Bow
- 1986: Young Australians' Best Book Award for picture book When the Wind Changed (illustrated by Deborah Niland)
- 1987: Member of the Order of Australia (AM): for services to literature
- 1992: The Age Book of the Year#Non-fiction Award: won for A Fence around the Cuckoo
- 1992: Colin Roderick Award: won for A Fence around the Cuckoo, presented with the H.T. Priestley Meda(Townsville Foundation for Australian Literary Studies Award)
- 1993: Tilly Aston Award for Braille Book of the Year: won for A Fence around the Cuckoo
- 1993: Talking Book of the Year Award (Royal Blind Society) won for A Fence around the Cuckoo
- 1993: Talking Book of the Year Award (Royal Blind Society) won for Fishing in the Styx
- 1993: Lloyd O'Neil Magpie Award for services to the Australian book industry
- 1994: CBCA COOL Award): won for Playing Beatie Bow
- 1994: Honorary Doctor of Letters by the University of New South Wales
- 1994: Fellowship of Australian Writers, Christina Stead Award: won for Home Before Dark
- 1996: Bilby Award, Young Reader Award: won for When the Wind Changed (illustrated by Deborah Niland)
- 2004: New South Wales Premier's Literary Awards#Special Award won
- 2006: listed in Bulletin's 100 most influential Australians
- 2008: Dromkeen Medal
- 2020: a River-class ferry on the Sydney Ferries network was named in her honour.

== Bibliography ==
=== Novels ===
- The Harp in the South (1948)
- Poor Man's Orange (1949); also published as 12 ^{1}/_{2} Plymouth Street, (1951)
- The Witch's Thorn (1951)
- A Power of Roses (1953)
- Serpent's Delight (1953); also published as The Good Looking Women, (1961)
- Pink Flannel (1955); also published as "Dear Hearts and Gentle People", (1981)
- One-a-Pecker, Two-a-Pecker (1957); also published as The Frost and the Fire, (1958)
- Swords and Crowns and Rings (1977)
- Missus (1985)

=== Children's books ===
- The Hole in the Hill (1961); also published as Secret of the Maori Cave, (1961)
- The Ship's Cat (1961)
- The Muddle-Headed Wombat series (1962–82)
- Airlift for Grandee (1962)
- The Road to Christmas (1962)
- The Road Under the Sea (1962)
- The Shaky Island (1962)
- Uncle Matt's Mountain (1962)
- The Ring for the Sorcerer (1967)
- The Sixpenny Island (1968)
- Nuki and the Sea Serpent: a Maori Legend (1969)
- The Runaway Bus (1969)
- Callie's Castle (1974)
- The Gigantic Balloon (1975)
- Merchant Campbell (1976)
- Roger Bandy (1977)
- Come Danger, Come Darkness (1978)
- Playing Beatie Bow (1980)
- When the Wind Changed (1980)
- The Big Brass Key (1983)
- My Sister Sif (1986)
- Callie's Family (1988)
- Things in Corners (1989) – short stories
- James (1991)

=== Radio plays ===
- The Bagman Stories (1943-1948)
- Stumpy (1947)
- Far from the Land
- Early in the Morning
- I'll Meet You in Botany Bay
- Gulliver's Cousin
- One Man's Kingdom (1957) - with D'arcy Niland
- A Little South of Heaven (1959) - with D'arcy Niland

=== TV plays ===
- No Decision (1962) - with D'arcy Niland

=== Non-fiction ===
- Der Goldene Bumerang (1955), or The Golden Boomerang
- The Drums Go Bang (1956), collaborative autobiography with D'Arcy Niland
- The Companion Guide to Sydney (1973)
- Norfolk Island and Lord Howe Island (1982)
- The Sydney We Love (1983)
- The Tasmania We Love (1987)
- A Fence Around the Cuckoo (1992), autobiography
- Fishing in the Styx (1993), autobiography
- Home Before Dark: The Story of Les Darcy, a Great Australian Hero (1995), with Rafe Champion

== See also ==
- List of New Zealand literary figures
