= Irish Australians =

Ethnic group in Australia

Gael-Astrálaigh (Irish)

Total population
- 2,410,833 (by ancestry, 2021) (9.0% of the Australian population); 80,927 (by birth, 2021)

Regions with significant populations
- All states and territories of Australia, although less common in Internal Territories

Languages
- Australian English, Hiberno-English

Religion
- Catholicism (majority), Anglicanism, Presbyterianism (minority)

Related ethnic groups
- Irish people, Australians, Overseas Irish, Anglo-Celtic Australians, Scottish Australians, Welsh Australians, English Australians, Cornish Australians, Manx Australians, Irish Americans, Irish Britons, Irish New Zealanders, Irish Canadians, European Australians

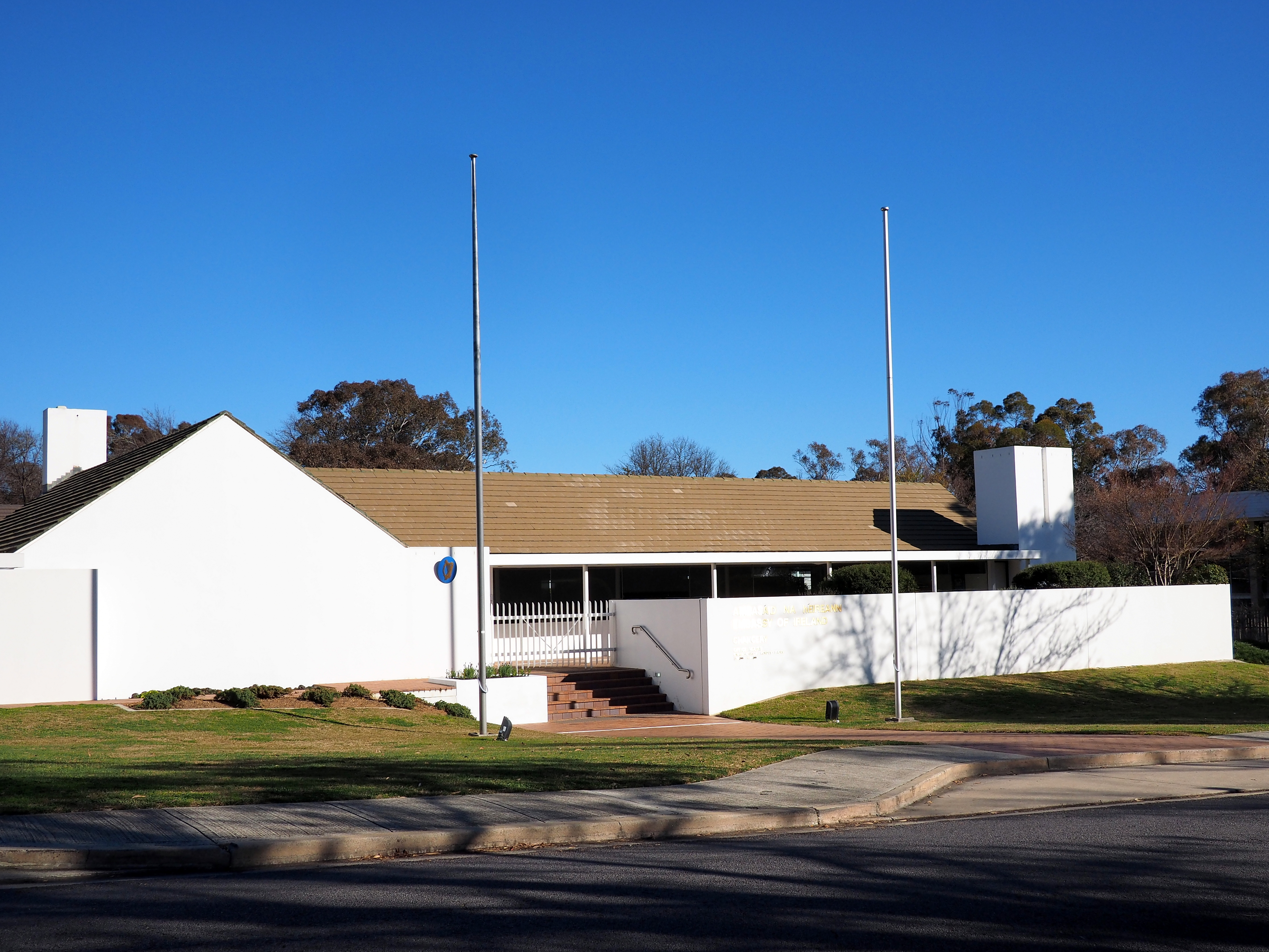
Irish embassy in Australia

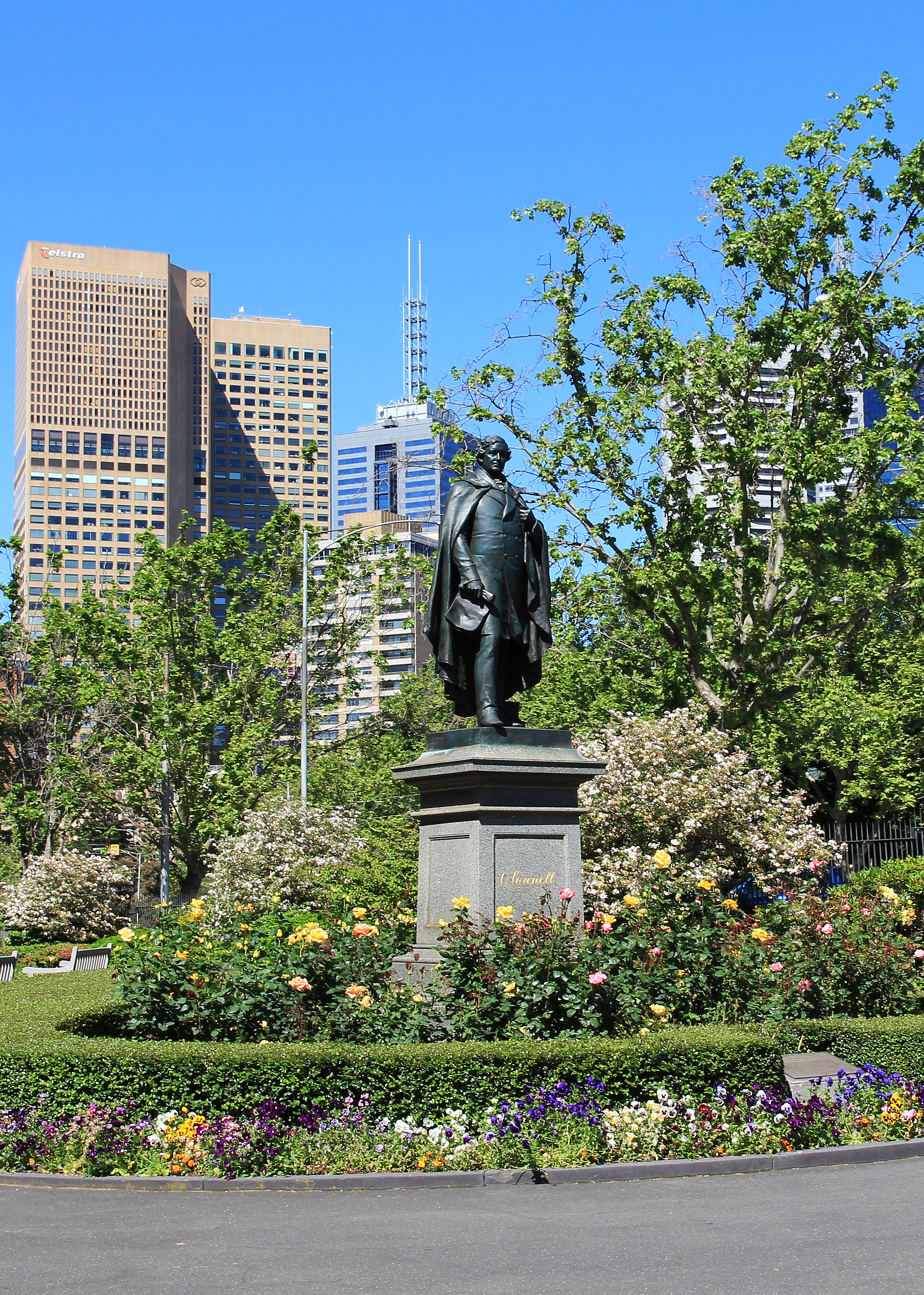
Statue of Irish leader Daniel O'Connell in Cathedral, Melbourne

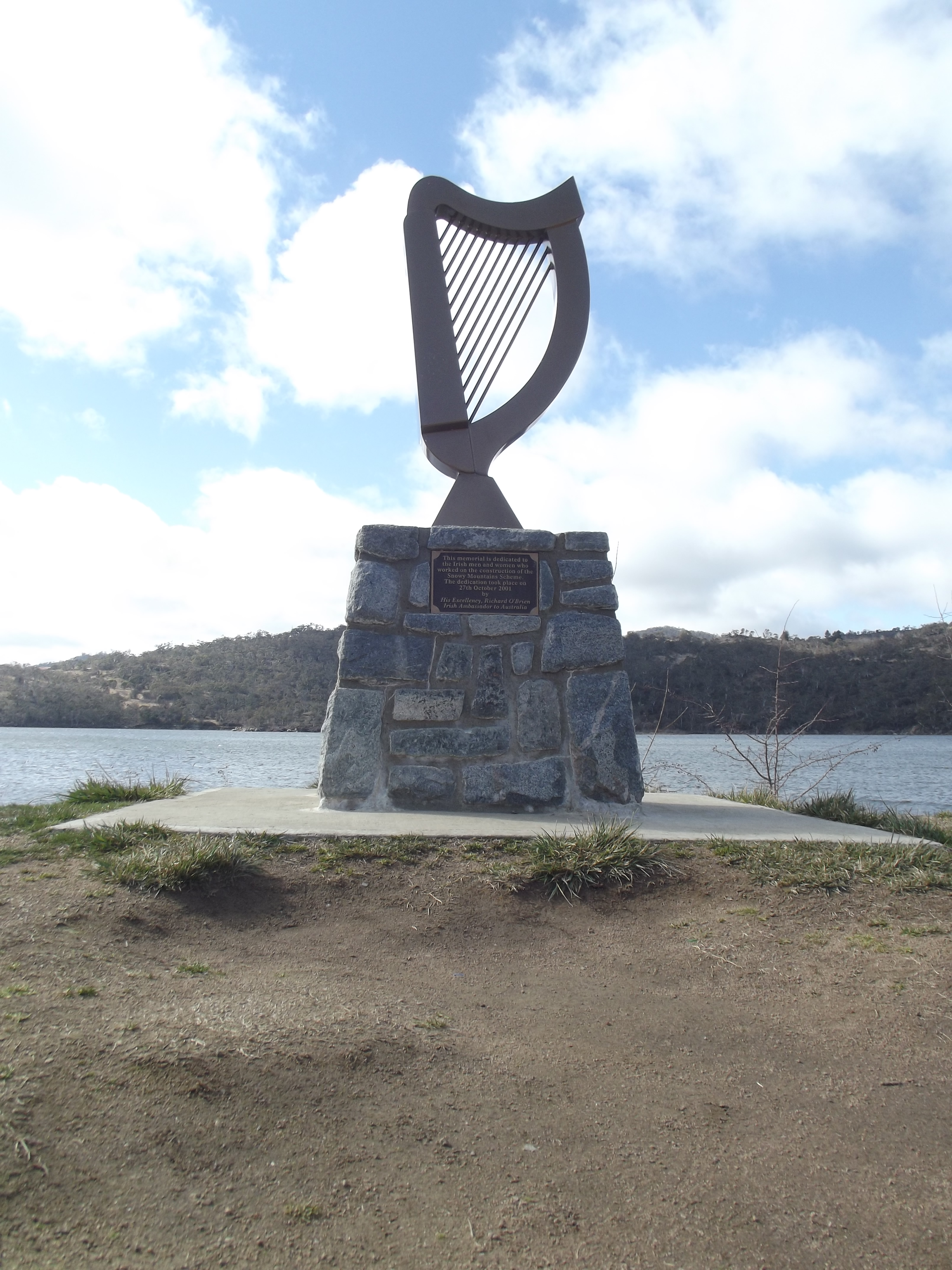
Monument to the Irish in Australia

Irish Australians (Irish: Gael-Astrálaigh) are ‌‍‍‍‍residents of Australia who are either fully or partially of Irish descent. Irish immigrants and their descendants have had a prominent presence in Australian society since the First Fleet's arrival in New South Wales in 1788.

Irish Australians have played a considerable role in the history of Australia. They came to Australia from the late eighteenth century as convicts and free settlers wanting to emigrate from their homeland. Some of those who were transported to Australia were prisoners of war, many of whom had fought in the 1798 Irish rebellion for independence, whereas others were settlers who struggled to establish their lives during the Irish famine and the harsh years in Ireland that followed. They made substantial contributions to Australia's development in many different areas. In the late 19th century, Irish Australians constituted up to a third of the country's population.

There is no definitive figure of the total number of Australians with an Irish background. At the 2021 Australian census, 2,410,833 residents identified themselves as having Irish ancestry either alone or in combination with another ancestry. This nominated ancestry was third behind English and Australian in terms of the largest number of responses and represents 9.5% of the total population of Australia. However this figure does not include Australians with an Irish background who chose to nominate themselves as 'Australian' or other ancestries. The Australian embassy in Dublin states that up to 30% of the population claim some degree of Irish ancestry.

== History ==
=== Demographic history ===
People with Irish ancestry as a percentage of the population in Australia divided geographically by statistical local area, as of the 2011 census

External videos
- Part One of Booknotes interview with Thomas Keneally on The Great Shame and the Triumph of the Irish in the English-Speaking World, 2 January 2000, C-SPAN
- Part Two of Booknotes interview with Keneally, 9 January 2000, C-SPAN

An estimated 40,000 Irish were transported to Australia between 1791 and 1867, including at least 325 who had participated in either the Irish Rebellion of 1798, the rebellion of 1803 or the Young Ireland skirmishes in 1848. Once in Australia, some were involved in the 1804 Castle Hill convict rebellion. Continual tension on Norfolk Island in the same year also led to an Irish revolt. Both risings were soon crushed. As late as the 1860s Fenian prisoners were being transported, particularly to Western Australia, where the Catalpa rescue of Irish radicals off Rockingham was a memorable episode.

Other than convicts, most of the laborers who voluntarily emigrated to Australia in the 19th century were drawn from the poorest sector of British and Irish society. After 1831, the Australian colonies employed a system of government assistance in which all or most immigration costs were paid for chosen immigrants, and the colonial authorities used these schemes to exercise some control over immigration. While these assisted schemes were biased against the poorest elements of society, the very poor could overcome these hurdles in several ways, such as relying on local assistance or help from relatives.

Most Irish immigrants to Australia were free settlers. The 1891 census of Australia counted 228,000 Irish-born. At the time the Irish made up about 27 percent of the immigrants from the British Isles. The number of Ireland-born in Australia peaked in 1891. A decade later the number of Ireland-born had dropped to 184,035. Dominion status for the Irish Free State in 1922 did not diminish arrivals from Ireland as Irish people were still British subjects. This changed after the Second World War, as people migrating from the new Republic of Ireland (which came into being in April 1949) were no longer British subjects eligible for the assisted passage. People from Northern Ireland continued to be eligible for this as British citizens. Only during the 1960s did migration from the Republic of Ireland reduce significantly.

During a visit to Ireland in 1987, Australian prime minister Bob Hawke re-iterated to the Irish Press that Irish immigrants were welcome:

"Of 16 million Australians, five million at least have Irish antecedents. Apart from Ireland, Australia is more Irish than any other country. Irish culture permeates the whole national makeup of the Australian character and psyche and we therefore welcome them. We also welcome the continuing arrangements whereby young people travelling to each other's country can get permits to work while they are there."

By 2002, around one thousand persons born in Ireland – north and south – were migrating permanently to Australia each year.

==== Irish and Aboriginal People ====
It has been argued that Irish Australians and Aboriginal people (including those of mixed descent) feel that there is a historical and sentimental link between the two groups. The shared oppression of Aboriginal and Irish people by the British is seen as giving them common historical ground.

The historian Patrick O'Farrell argued that (in contrast to other colonists) Irish Catholics treated Aboriginal people as equals, as evidenced by their willingness to intermarry, thus giving rise to the Irish surnames prominent among Aboriginal activists.

This argument has been questioned. It has been pointed out that under the new colonial and state administrations, a European-style surname was required for official records relating to Aboriginal people. The local police (often of Irish stock) collected the relevant census data and allocated their own names to Aboriginal people for official purposes. In addition, however, many such policemen fathered children to casual or long-term partners from Aboriginal communities.

==== Orphans ====
Over four thousand young female orphans from Irish workhouses were shipped to the Australian colonies at the time of the Great Famine (1848–50) to meet a demand for domestic servants. Some settlers greeted them with hostility and some were exploited or abused by employers and others. Although a number eventually died in poverty, others made upwardly mobile marriages, often surviving older husbands to experience long widowhoods. The Catholic Church only became involved in the 1870s, when its relief agencies in England were overwhelmed with Irish immigration. Even so, only about 10% of the resettlements were through Catholic agencies until after World War II. Australian Catholic groups began importing children in the 1920s to increase the Catholic population, and became heavily engaged in placing and educating them after World War II. The practice quietly died out during the 1950s.

==== Irish language ====
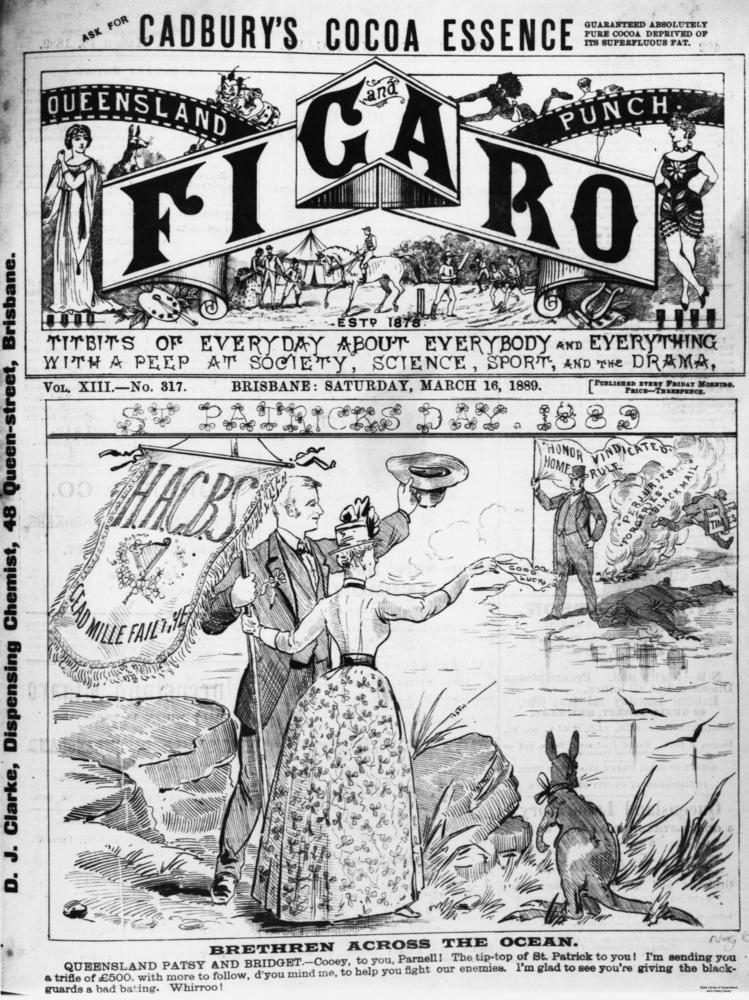
Queensland Figaro and Punch cover, 16 March 1889, depicting Irish Australians offering enthusiastic support to Parnell's struggle for Home Rule.

The first convicts and soldiers to arrive in Australia included a large number of Irish speakers, an example being private Patrick Geary, who in 1808 acted as court interpreter for Patrick Henchan, a convict accused of theft. An account from 1800 refers to convicts speaking Irish among themselves (this being regarded as evidence of conspiracy), and it was acknowledged in the 1820s that priests could not perform their duties in the colony of New South Wales without a knowledge of the language. There is a reference to Irish-speaking bushrangers in Van Diemen's Land in the early nineteenth century.

The gold rushes of the 1850s attracted many Irish to the colony of Victoria, with a high proportion of Irish speakers. An Irish-speaking priest, Fr Stack, was appointed to minister to Irish miners in the gold-rush locality of Bendigo. Irish immigration was at its height in the 1860s, the main counties of origin being Clare, Tipperary, Limerick and Kilkenny, all of them areas where the language was still strong. Irish continued to be spoken in Australian country districts where the Irish had settled, and there is some evidence of its being transmitted to the next generation.

The Gaelic revival in Ireland at the end of the nineteenth century found a response in Melbourne and Sydney, with branches of the Gaelic League being established. The 1970s saw a renewal of interest in the language, chiefly among Australians of Irish descent, and there is now a network of Irish speakers in the major cities. The Department of Celtic Studies at the University of Sydney offers courses in Old Irish and Modern Irish, and Newman College (University of Melbourne) houses a collection of books and manuscripts in Irish often used by scholars. Australians have published fiction, poetry and journalism in Irish.

==== Australian Irish Sign Language ====
Alongside the oral Irish language, ISL (or Irish Sign Language) arrived with Dominican Nuns in 1875 with the construction of three schools where Australian Irish Sign Language (AISL) was taught. As a Francosign language, AISL is quite distinct from Auslan and other Banzsl languages, though it is also notably unrelated neither to Gaeilge nor to the numerous Australian Aboriginal sign languages.

AISL and the more dominant Australian sign language, Auslan, were used as the primary languages of Deaf instruction from the late 1800s to the early 1950s. By this point, however, with all sign languages experiencing the effects of oralism and audism, AISL has over time become relegated to small groups of friends and families.

=== Politics ===
Due to the considerably large Irish Catholic population in Australia, this enabled the Irish population to influence the politicial sphere of early Australian history immensely. Before 1890, Irish Catholics opposed Henry Parkes, the main liberal leader, and free trade, since both represented Protestant, English landholding and wealthy business interests. In the great strike of 1890 Cardinal Moran, the head of the church, was sympathetic toward unions, but Catholic newspapers were critical of organised labour throughout the decade. After 1900, Catholics joined the Labor Party because its stress on equality and social welfare appealed to people who were workers and small farmers. In the 1910 elections Labor gained in areas where the concentration of Catholics was above average, and the number of Catholics in Labor's parliamentary ranks rose.

==== World War I ====
Irish Catholics comprised a quarter of Australia's population in the early 20th century. They were largely working-class and voted for the Labor Party. The referendum on conscription in 1917, following the Easter Uprising in Dublin, caused an identification between the Irish, Sinn Féin, and the anti-conscription section of Labor. Pro-conscription forces exploited this, denouncing outspoken anti-conscription Catholics, such as Archbishop Mannix, and T. J. Ryan, the Premier of Queensland, for disloyalty. In general, Protestants, armed with the authority of tradition, championed the idea of Australia as an integral part of the Empire; and Catholics, freed from that authority by their Irish origins and their working-class affiliations, looked to the future by placing Australia first and the Empire second. There was no simple correlation between Catholicism, Protestantism and conscription, but the idea of an anti-conscription Catholic-Labor alliance stuck for many years. Immediately after the War, Mannix's outspoken support for the cause of Irish independence caused further division, culminating in his arrest on the high seas by the Royal Navy in 1920 to prevent his landing in Ireland.

==== Irish Australians in politics ====
Irish Australians have been prominent in Australian politics. The support base of the Australian Labor Party (ALP) was historically dominated by working-class Catholics of Irish descent. James Scullin became the ALP's first Irish Catholic leader in 1928 and Australia's first Irish Catholic prime minister the following year. Other ALP prime ministers of Irish Catholic origin include John Curtin (1941–1945), Frank Forde (1945), Ben Chifley (1945–1949), and Paul Keating (1991–1996). On the political right, Irish Protestant figures S. M. Bruce (1923–1929), Arthur Fadden (1941), John McEwen (1967–1968), and William McMahon (1971–1972) served as prime minister along with Irish Catholic ALP defector Joseph Lyons (1931–1939). The 1931 federal election was the first at which both major party candidates were of Irish Catholic origin.

The same was true in the twentieth century at a state level. In New South Wales for example Labor premiers James McGirr, Joseph Cahill and Jack Renshaw were Irish Australian, while Queensland had Labor premiers T. J. Ryan, Ted Theodore, William Forgan Smith, Frank Arthur Cooper, Ned Hanlon, and Vince Gair.

Conversely, conservative parties contained few Irish Catholics for most of the twentieth century. The situation changed later especially following the Australian Labor Party split of 1955, which led many Catholics out of Labor via the Democratic Labor Party (DLP). The careers of Gerard Henderson, Frank Devine and Padraic McGuinness are illustrative of the drift by some Irish Australians away from Labor and towards the conservative side of politics in the later twentieth century.

== Status ==
Walker (2007) compares Irish immigrant communities in the United States, Australia, New Zealand, Canada and Great Britain respecting issues of identity and 'Irishness.' Religion remained the major cause of differentiation in all Irish diaspora communities and had the greatest impact on identity, followed by the nature and difficulty of socioeconomic conditions faced in each new country and the strength of continued social and political links of Irish immigrants and their descendants with the old country.

For much of the 19th and the 20th centuries, Irish Australians, particularly but not exclusively Catholics, were treated with suspicion in a sectarian atmosphere. The outlaw Ned Kelly (1855–80) achieved the status of a national folk hero; ballads, films and paintings have since 1878 perpetuated the legend. Kelly, who was hanged for murder, is often viewed romantically as the sort of treatment Irish Catholics in Australia could expect. In major cities such as Melbourne and Sydney, Irish social and political associations were formed, including the Melbourne Celtic Club, which survives today. The Irish settler in Australia, both voluntary and forced, was crucial to the survival and prosperity of the early colonies both demographically and economically. 300,000 Irish free settlers arrived between 1840 and 1914. By 1871, the Irish were a quarter of all overseas-born.

=== St. Patrick's Day ===
O'Farrell (1995) demonstrates the importance of St. Patrick to the Irish, whether northern or republican, Protestant or Catholic, and how Australian manifestations of the Irish festival evolved. St. Patrick's Day became an expression of Irish identity and was emblematic of Irish culture and traditional separatism that migrated with the Irish to Australia. The early immigrants to Australia from Ireland were mainly members of penal colonies; assemblies or any such expression of Irish culture were not permitted. St. Patrick's Day at first was the exception, because it was not highly political, was ecumenical and was subordinate to the wider recognition of Britain. It is first recorded as celebrated in the colony in 1795. In a series of letters, a P. Cunningham, stated that a St Patrick's Day "jubilee" Ball was being held in Sydney in 1826. The situation changed, however, in the 1830s with the growth of wealthy Irish Catholic emancipists and the introduction of Irish Catholic priests. These factors gave rise to conflicts and tensions that were to remain constant thereafter as the rise and decline of domestic Irish political movements influenced the Irish population in Australia. With the outbreak of World War I, imperatives imposed by the demands of war overshadowed Australian Irish sentiment.

=== Orange ===
The idea of fraternity and how to organise it was one of 19th-century Europe's invisible exports to the New World. Fitzpatrick (2005) explores the international diffusion of the Loyal Orange Institution, with comparative reference to Freemasonry, its main model. Three alternative explanations are discussed for its appeal outside Ireland: that it facilitated the assimilation of emigrants, transmitted 'tribal' Irish animosities to fresh contexts, or adapted itself to preexisting sectarian rivalries abroad. These hypotheses are tested using evidence from South Australia, where Orangeism flourished in the absence of heavy Ulster Protestant immigration. A collective profile of Orange South Australia is derived from lodge records showing age, religious denomination, and occupation, and the appeal of Orangeism is related to local political and religious contexts. In this case, Orangeism was primarily an export of organisational techniques rather than Irish personnel or bigotry.

=== Catholic clergy and nuns ===
The Catholic Church in Australia maintained a strong Irish identity. The first priests were Irish, beginning with Fr James Dixon who was permitted to minister in 1803. Irish Catholic separateness increased especially in the decades from the 1880s to the 1960s when state aid for church schools was withdrawn and the Church maintained a separate and separately funded school system. The leadership of the Australian Church was almost entirely Irish from 1883 to 1940, prominent Irish-born bishops including Cardinal Moran and Archbishop Kelly in Sydney, Archbishops Carr and Mannix in Melbourne and Archbishop Duhig in Brisbane. Many of the Catholic schools were run and staffed by Irish orders of nuns such as the Sisters of Mercy and Brigidines and Irish orders of brothers such as the Christian Brothers and Patrician Brothers. The Sisters of Charity worked in hospitals. Irish nuns such as Sr Mary Baptist De Lacy, Mary Gonzaga Barry and Mother Vincent Whitty were prominent in founding hospitals and schools.

McGrath (1995) demonstrates the success of the Catholic nuns who arrived in Parramatta, New South Wales, from Ireland in 1888, noting their group's growth from nine newcomers into a flourishing congregation of over two hundred women within sixty years. By the 1950s this group of women religious was responsible for 24 primary schools, five secondary schools, and two orphanages. In Australia they carried on the Irish tradition of the Sisters of Mercy and lived a monastic lifestyle. Their sparsely furnished bedrooms were referred to as cells. There was little or no heating. The sisters' spiritual practices reflected the 17th-century school of spirituality.

Their relationship to the clergy was one of devotion, dedication, and subordination, thus reflecting the status of women in the larger population. It was societal pressures from without that eventually led to the decline of the Sisters of Mercy as Australia moved into the 1960s. Radical re-evaluations forced a restructuring of the Catholic Church as a whole, and a rethinking of what kinds of service the Church would require in modern times.

== Media ==
The Irish Echo (Australia) is a newspaper available in print and online, covering Irish news and other matters of Irish interest.

Tinteán is an online journal directed chiefly at Irish Australians. Its stated aim is to provide serious comment and an independent perspective on a wide range of Australian/Irish topics. It publishes some material in the Irish language.

An Lúibín is a fortnightly Irish-language newsletter, distributed online in Australia and overseas. It deals with language matters and also contains articles on folklore, literature and current affairs.It can be found at the website of the Irish Language Association of Australia

== Sports ==
Irish Catholics have been the nation's largest minority throughout most of Australia's history. Their resistance to the elite Anglocentric establishment has keenly marked the development of sport. Many Irish in Australia play gaelic games and the local gaelic athletic association is the Australasia GAA. Only Irish Australian soccer clubs they have helped to establish in Sydney Eastern Suburbs clubs Phoenix FC. and a Melbourne south-east soccer clubs St Kilda Celts SC.

== Present day ==
At the 2006 Census, 50,255 Australian residents declared they were born in the Republic of Ireland and a further 21,291 declared to have been born in Northern Ireland. Cities with the largest Irish-born populations were Sydney (12,730), Melbourne (8,950) and Perth (7,060).

At the 2011 Census, 2,087,800 Australians (10.4% of the total population) declared they had Irish ancestry either alone or in combination with another ancestry; only Australian and English ancestries were more frequently nominated.

Irish Australian settlement patterns are not significantly different from those of the Australian population as a whole – that is, a third live in New South Wales and a quarter live in Victoria, with 13 per cent living in Queensland (compared to only 18 per cent of the general population). Relatively few as a proportion reside in Western Australia (7.6 per cent of Irish Australians compared to 9.9 per cent of the general population).

The 2001 Australian census recorded that persons reporting some Irish Australian ethnicity accounted for 10.7 per cent of all responses in the Australian Capital Territory (42,540 responses), 10.2 per cent in Victoria (469,161 responses), 9.9 per cent in New South Wales (622,944), 9.7 per cent in Queensland (433,354), 7.8 per cent in Tasmania (42,552), 7.6 per cent in Western Australia (171,667), 7.5 per cent in the Northern Territory (18,325) and 6.7 per cent in South Australia (119,063).

=== Irish language use ===
In the 2011 Census 1,895 persons were reported as using Irish as a household language, most of them in Sydney and Melbourne. This represents an increase from the figure of 918 in the 2006 Census. There are no official statistics regarding the use of Irish outside the home.

Number of Irish speakers in Australian Census
2006	2011	2016	2021
918	1895	1946	1875

== Popular culture ==
The Riverina priest "John O'Brien" (Fr Patrick Hartigan) celebrated rural Irish Australian Catholic culture in his popular poems of the early twentieth century such as 'The little Irish mother' and 'Said Hanrahan'. They formed the basis of a 1925 silent movie Around the Boree Log.

The Australian miniseries and historical drama Against the Wind deals with both the British rule of Ireland, and the development of New South Wales and Australia. Ruth Park's 1948 book The Harp in the South portrays the life of a Catholic Irish Australian family living in a Sydney slum. Other shows relating to Irish Australians include The Last Outlaw and Brides of Christ.

== Demographics ==
Irish Australian demography by religion (note that it include only Irish born in Ireland and not australian with Irish ancestries)
Religious group	2021 (Note: Religious breakdown proportions based on "Irish" ethnic or cultural origin response on the 2021 census.)		2016 (Note: Religious breakdown proportions based on "Irish" ethnic or cultural origin response on the 2016 census.)		2011 (Note: Religious breakdown proportions based on "Irish" ethnic or cultural origin response on the 2011 census.)	
Religious group	Pop.	%	Pop.	%	Pop.	%
Catholic	54,413 ▲	67.24% ▼	53,679 ▲	71.68% ▼	50,725	75.35%
Eastern Orthodox	35 ▼	0.04% ▼	39 ▲	0.05% ▲	30	0.04%
Protestant and Other christian	4,649 ▼	5.74% ▼	5,076 ▼	6.78% ▼	6,003	8.92%
(Total Christian)	59,095 ▲	73.02% ▼	58,791▲	78.5% ▼	56,757	84.31%
Islam	126 ▲	0.16% ▲	111 ▲	0.15% ▲	72	0.11%
No religion	19,403 ▲	23.98% ▲	12,775 ▲	17.06% ▲	7,655	11.37%
Buddhism	207 ▼	0.26% ▼	242 ▼	0.32% ▼	265	0.39%
Hinduism	184 ▲	0.23% ▲	152 ▲	0.2% ▲	71	0.11%
Judaism	90 ▲	0.11% ▼	88 ▼	0.12% ▼	102	0.15%
Other	100 ▼	0.12% ▼	109 ▼	0.15% ▼	139	0.21%
Not stated	1,720 ▼	2.13% ▼	2,628 ▲	3.51% ▲	2,266	3.37%
Total Irish Australian population	80,927 ▲	100%	74,891 ▲	100%	67,318	100%

== Notable people of Irish descent ==
- Ned Kelly, Bushranger, outlaw and cultural icon. Known for wearing a suit of bulletproof armour.
- Slim Dusty, Australian country music singer-songwriter, guitarist, producer and Australian cultural icon, first Australian to have a No. 1 international hit song with "A Pub with No Beer" originally adapted from a poem by Irish Australian poet Dan Sheahan.
- Johnny O'Keefe, Australian rock and roll singer.
- Doug Parkinson, Australian pop and rock singer.
- Frank Hassett, The first chief of the Australian Defence Force, war hero
- Colleen McCullough, Australian author.
- John O'Grady (writer), Australian novelist and poet.
- P. L. Travers, Australian-British writer, author of the Mary Poppins (book series).
- Robert Hughes (critic), Australian art critic, writer and producer of television documentaries.
- Katherine Knight, Australian murderer
- Bill O'Reilly (cricketer), Australian cricketer, cricket writer and broadcaster.
- Helen Reddy, Australian-American singer, actress, and activist.
- Peter Lalor, Irish-born Australian rebel and, later, politician who rose to fame for his leading role in the Eureka Rebellion.
- Errol Flynn, Australian-American actor.
- Julia Gillard, 27th prime minister of Australia, first female prime minister of Australia.
- Anthony Albanese, 31st prime minister of Australia
- Alan Joyce, former CEO of Qantas, born in Ireland and emigrated to Australia in 1996.
- John Howard, 25th prime minister of Australia
- Jim Stynes, Australian Rules footballer and Brownlow Medallist. Born in Ireland and emigrated to Australia in the 1980s.
- Johnny Logan, double-time winner of the Eurovision Song Contest, born in Melbourne.
- Irwin family, Australian family
  - Bob Irwin, naturalist and zookeeper
  - Steve Irwin, zookeeper, conservationist, television personality
  - Bindi Irwin, actress, conservationist, television personality
  - Robert Irwin, actor, conservationist, television personality
- William McMahon, 20th prime minister of Australia
- Julian McMahon, Australian actor
- Luke Hemsworth, Australian actor.
- Chris Hemsworth, Australian actor.
- Liam Hemsworth, Australian actor.
- Paul Hogan, Australian actor and comedian.
- Jimeoin, Irish-Australian comedian and actor.
- Joseph Lyons, 10th prime minister of Australia, legislated the creation of the Australian broadcaster that is now known as the Australian Broadcasting Corporation (ABC) in 1932, the first prime minister to have an Australian-born parent.
- Arthur Fadden, 13th prime minister of Australia
- Frank Costigan, Australian lawyer, Royal Commissioner and social justice activist, who presided over the Costigan Commission combating organised crime.
- Tony Fitzgerald, Australian former judge, who presided over the anti-corruption Fitzgerald Inquiry.
- Ben Chifley, 16th prime minister of Australia, expanded state welfare, increased Post-war immigration to Australia, established the Australian National University, established the Australian Security Intelligence Organisation, established the Snowy Mountains Scheme.
- Joseph Cahill, former premier of New South Wales, championed and organised the idea and construction of the Sydney Opera House.
- Edward Cassidy, Australian prelate of the Catholic Church, headed the Commission of the Holy See for Religious Relations with the Jews, promoted positive theological ties with Jews.
- George William Torrance, music composer, appointed acting head of Trinity College (University of Melbourne) in 1872, collaborated with Alfred William Howitt in the transcription of three songs performed by William Barak, the last traditional ngurungaeta (elder) of the Wurundjeri-willam clan
- Michael Dwyer, known as the "Wicklow Chief", rebel leader fighting for religious freedom and Irish independence in and after the Irish Rebellion of 1798, former Chief of Police in Liverpool, NSW.
- Les Darcy, Australian Heavyweight Champion boxer.
- Pat Rafter, Australian former world No. 1 tennis player, first man in the Open Era to win Canada Masters, Cincinnati Masters and the US Open in the same year.
- Mick Fanning, Australian ASP World Champion surfer and shark attack survivor.
- Sarah Frances Fanny Durack, Australian competition swimmer, from 1910 until 1918 she was the world's greatest female swimmer across all distances from freestyle sprints to the mile marathon.
- Michael Hutchence, Australian musician, singer-songwriter and actor.
- Rupert Murdoch, Australian-born American businessman, media proprietor, and investor.
- Geoffrey Rush, Australian actor.
- Kevin Rudd, 26th prime minister of Australia, gave the first national government Apology to Australia's Indigenous peoples in 2008.
- Daisy Bates (author), journalist, welfare worker, compiled a dictionary of several Australian Aboriginal dialects.
- Rose Byrne, Australian actress.
- Nicole Kidman, American and Australian actress and producer.
- Justine Clarke, Australian actress, singer, author and television host.
- Natalie Imbruglia, Australian and British singer and actress.
- Elizabeth Debicki, Australian actress.
- Toni Collette, Australian actress and singer-songwriter.
- Robert O'Hara Burke, Australian explorer, leader of the 1860 Burke and Wills expedition with the objective of crossing Australia from the south to the north.
- John King (explorer), Australian explorer, sole survivor of the completed Burke and Wills expedition, first surviving non Aboriginal to cross Australia from south to north.
- Paddy Glynn, Irish-Australian lawyer and politician, involved in the drafting of the 1901 Constitution of Australia, formerly appointed as Attorney-General of Australia, supported Irish nationalism, free trade and female suffrage.
- Thomas Grady, Crimean War veteran and recipient of the Victoria Cross, the highest and most prestigious British Commonwealth award for gallantry in the face of the enemy.
- William Wentworth, Australian statesman, pastoralist, explorer, newspaper editor, lawyer, politician and author, who with Gregory Blaxland and William Lawson led the 1813 crossing of the Blue Mountains, the first successful non-Aborigines to traverse the region.
- D'Arcy Wentworth, Irish-Australian surgeon and the first paying passenger to arrive in the new colony of New South Wales, helped finance (through utilising rum trade profits) the construction of Sydney Hospital, led a campaign for the rights and recognition of Emancipists and for trial by jury.
- Paddy Hannan, gold prospector whose lucrative discovery on 14 June 1893 set off a major gold rush in the area now known as The Golden Mile, the richest square mile in the world in Kalgoorlie-Boulder in Western Australia.
- John Curtin, 14th prime minister of Australia, WWII Australian war time leader, extended pensions to cover Aboriginals.
- H. V. Evatt, known as Doc Evatt, Australian politician and judge, former President of the United Nations General Assembly, helped to draft the Universal Declaration of Human Rights and was prominent in the negotiations that led to the creation of the State of Israel.
- Millie Peacock, was the first woman elected to the Parliament of Victoria.
- Frank Forde, 15th prime minister of Australia.
- John McEwen, 18th prime minister of Australia.
- Gerard Brennan, Australian High Court judge, wrote the lead judgement on the Mabo decision, which gave rise to the Native Title Act.
- Jacinta Nampijinpa Price, Australian Federal Senator, former Deputy Mayor of Alice Springs, of Indigenous Australian Warlpiri and Irish ancestry.
- Lowitja O'Donoghue, Aboriginal Australian public administrator, inaugural chairperson of the Aboriginal and Torres Strait Islander Commission.
- Melissa Doyle, Australian television and radio presenter.
- Malarndirri McCarthy, Indigenous Australian Senator, former TV journalist, Federal Minister for Indigenous Australians.
- Pat O'Shane, Australia's first Aboriginal magistrate.
- Michael Kirby (judge), Australian former justice of the High Court of Australia, appointed by the United Nations Human Rights Council to lead an inquiry into human rights abuses in North Korea.
- Heath Ledger, Australian actor and music video director.
- Mick Doohan, Australian former Grand Prix motorcycle road racing World Champion, who won five consecutive 500 cc World Championships.
- Jack Doohan, Australian racing driver competing in Formula One racing for Alpine F1 Team.
- Oscar Piastri, Australian racing driver competing in Formula One racing for McLaren.
- Ken Wyatt, Australian politician of English, Irish, Indian and Indigenous Australian descent, the first Indigenous Australian elected to the House of Representatives, the first Indigenous Australian to serve as a government minister and the first Indigenous Australian appointed to cabinet.
- Captain Moonlite, Australian folk figure, former Anglican lay reader, soldier, public speaker and bushranger.
- J. F. Archibald, Australian journalist and publisher, founder of the annual Archibald Prize, Australia's most prestigious art prize for portraiture.
- Geraldine Doogue, Australian journalist, radio and television presenter.
- Glenn McGrath, Australian former international cricketer.
- Michael Lynagh, Australian former rugby union player.
- Norman Gilroy, known as "Bluey" Gilroy, first Australian-born Roman Catholic cardinal, first cardinal to be knighted since the Reformation, discouraged anti-communist Cold War hysteria in 1950s and helped ensure that there was no split in the New South Wales Labor Party.
- Thomas Keneally, Australian novelist, playwright, essayist, and actor. Author of non-fiction novel Schindler's Ark. The first novel by an Australian to win the Booker Prize and is the basis of the film Schindler's List.
- Peter Cosgrove, retired Australian Army General, former Governor-General of Australia, commander of the International Force for East Timor that prevented the ongoing slaughter of East Timorese Christians and enabled a democratic referendum and free elections and national independence in East Timor.
- Shane Lowry, Australian professional soccer player.
- Damien Leith, singer
- Sidney Nolan, artist
- Jake Fraser-McGurk - cricketer
- Todd Murphy - cricketer
- Xavier Doherty - former cricketer
- Steve O'Keefe - former cricketer
- Ross O'Donovan - Australian animator, voice actor, internet personality, former member of YouTube Let's Play channel Game Grumps.
- Harold Holt, 17th prime minister of Australia, promoted and implemented the successful 1967 Australian referendum (Aboriginals) that removed the openly racist terms in the Constitution of Australia Section 127 Headed "Aborigines not to be counted in reckoning population", this Constitutional amendment was supported by over 90% of the Australian population.
- Joseph Holt (rebel), former exiled United Irish general and leader of a large guerrilla force that fought for Irish independence in County Wicklow
- Jason Donovan, Australian actor and singer.
- Mary Fowler (soccer), Australian professional soccer player.
- James Scullin, 9th prime minister of Australia.
- D'Arcy Niland, Australian novelist and short story writer, achieved international fame with The Shiralee (novel) (1955), made into a 1957 film, and a 1987 TV mini-series.
- Paul Kelly (Australian musician), Australian rock music singer-songwriter and guitarist.

== See also ==
- Australians
- Anglo-Celtic Australians
- Australia–Ireland relations
- European Australians
- Europeans in Oceania
- Immigration to Australia
- Irish Americans
- Irish people
- Welsh Australians
- Irish diaspora
- English Australians
- Scottish Australians
- Cornish Australians
- Irish New Zealanders
