= The Shiralee =

Shiralee is a dated Australian term for a type of swag (bag containing possessions, carried by a swagman (itinerant worker)).

The Shiralee or Shiralee may also refer to:

- The Shiralee (novel), by D'Arcy Niland
  - The Shiralee (1957 film), a film adaptation starring Peter Finch
    - "Shiralee", a song from the film by Tommy Steele which reached #11 on the UK Singles Chart
  - The Shiralee (1987 film), an Australian television movie/miniseries adaptation featuring Bryan Brown
- The Shiralee, the second album of Australian rock band theredsunband
