= Swagman =

Transient Australian labourer

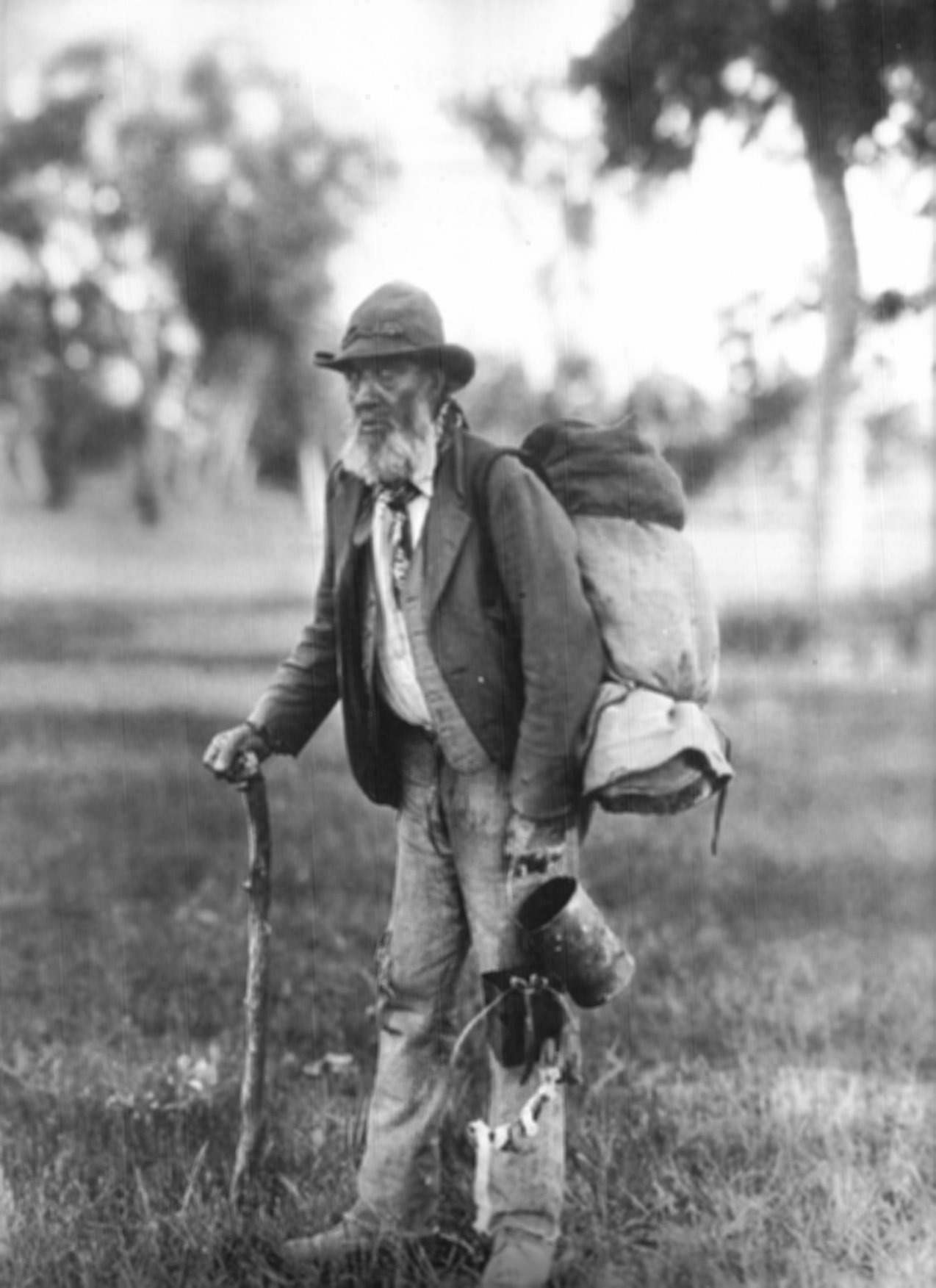
Photograph of a swagman, c. 1901

A swagman (also called a swaggie, sundowner or tussocker) was a transient labourer who travelled by foot from farm to farm carrying his belongings in a swag. The term originated in Australia in the 19th century and was later used in New Zealand.

Swagmen were particularly common in Australia during times of economic uncertainty, such as the 1890s and the Great Depression of the 1930s. Many unemployed men travelled the rural areas of Australia on foot, their few meagre possessions rolled up and carried in their swag. Their swag was frequently referred to as "Matilda", hence "Waltzing Matilda" refers to walking with a swag. Typically, they would seek work in farms and towns they travelled through, and in many cases farmers, if no permanent work was available, would provide food and shelter in return for some menial task.

The figure of the "jolly swagman", represented most famously in Banjo Paterson's bush poem "Waltzing Matilda", became a folk hero in 19th-century Australia, and is still seen today as a symbol of anti-authoritarian values that Australians consider to be part of the national character.

== Etymology ==
In the early 1800s, the term swag was used by British thieves to describe any amount of stolen goods. One definition given in Francis Grose's 1811 Dictionary of the Vulgar Tongue is "any booty you have lately obtained,.... To carry the swag is to be the bearer of the stolen goods to a place of safety". James Hardy Vaux, a convict in Australia, used the term for similar purposes in his memoirs written in 1812 and published in 1819. By the 1830s, the term in Australia had transferred from meaning goods acquired by a thief to the possessions and daily necessaries carried by a bushman. The compound swagman and colloquial variation swaggie first appeared in the 1850s during the Australian gold rushes, alongside less common terms such as bundleman. New Zealanders adopted the term in the 1880s, where swagmen were also known as swaggers. Swagger in this sense originated in Australia, but became obsolete there by the 1890s.

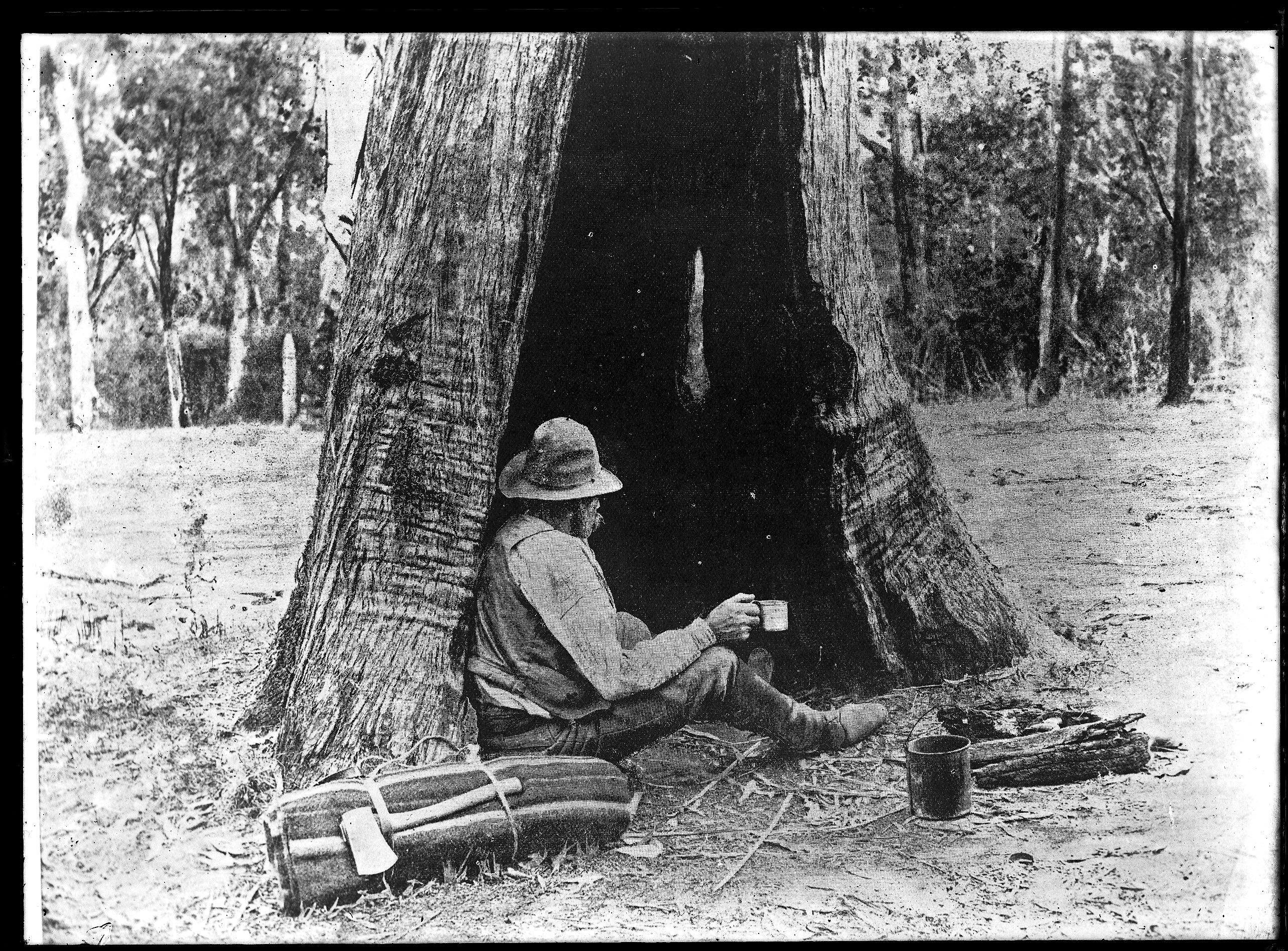
Swagman, n.d.

== History ==
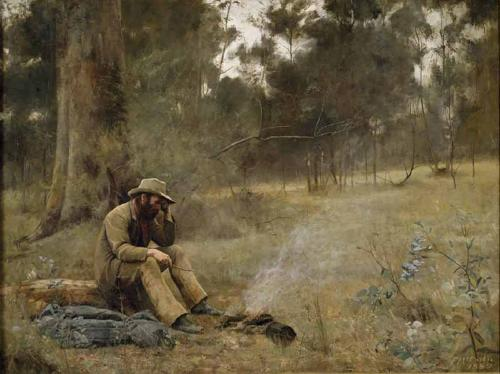
Down on His Luck, painted by Frederick McCubbin in 1889, depicts a melancholic swagman "on the Wallaby"

Before motor transport became common, the Australian wool industry was heavily dependent on itinerant shearers who carried their swags from farm to farm (called properties or "stations" in Australia), but would not in general have taken kindly to being called "swagmen". Outside of the shearing season their existence was frugal, and this possibly explains the past tradition of sheep stations in particular providing enough food to last until the next station even when no work was available. Some were especially noted for their hospitality, such as Canowie Station in South Australia, which around 1903 provided over 2,000 sundowners each year with their customary two meals and a bed.

A romanticised figure, the swagman is famously referred to in the song "Waltzing Matilda", by Banjo Paterson, which tells of a swagman who steals a sheep from the local squatter.

The economic depressions of the 1860s and 1890s saw an increase in these itinerant workers. During these periods it was seen as 'mobilising the workforce'. At one point it was rumoured that a "Matilda Waltzers' Union" had been formed to give representation to swagmen at the Federation of Australia in 1901.

During the early years of the 1900s, the introduction of the pension and the dole reduced the numbers of swagmen to those who preferred the free lifestyle. During World War I many were called up for duty and fought at Gallipoli as ANZACs. The song "And The Band Played Waltzing Matilda" tells the story of a swagman who fought at Gallipoli.

The numbers of swagmen have declined over the 20th century, but still rise in times of economic depression. Swagmen remain a romantic icon of Australian history and folklore.

Swags are still heavily used, particularly in Australia, by overlanders and campers. There are still a large number of manufacturers actively making both standard and custom-design swags.

== Lifestyle ==
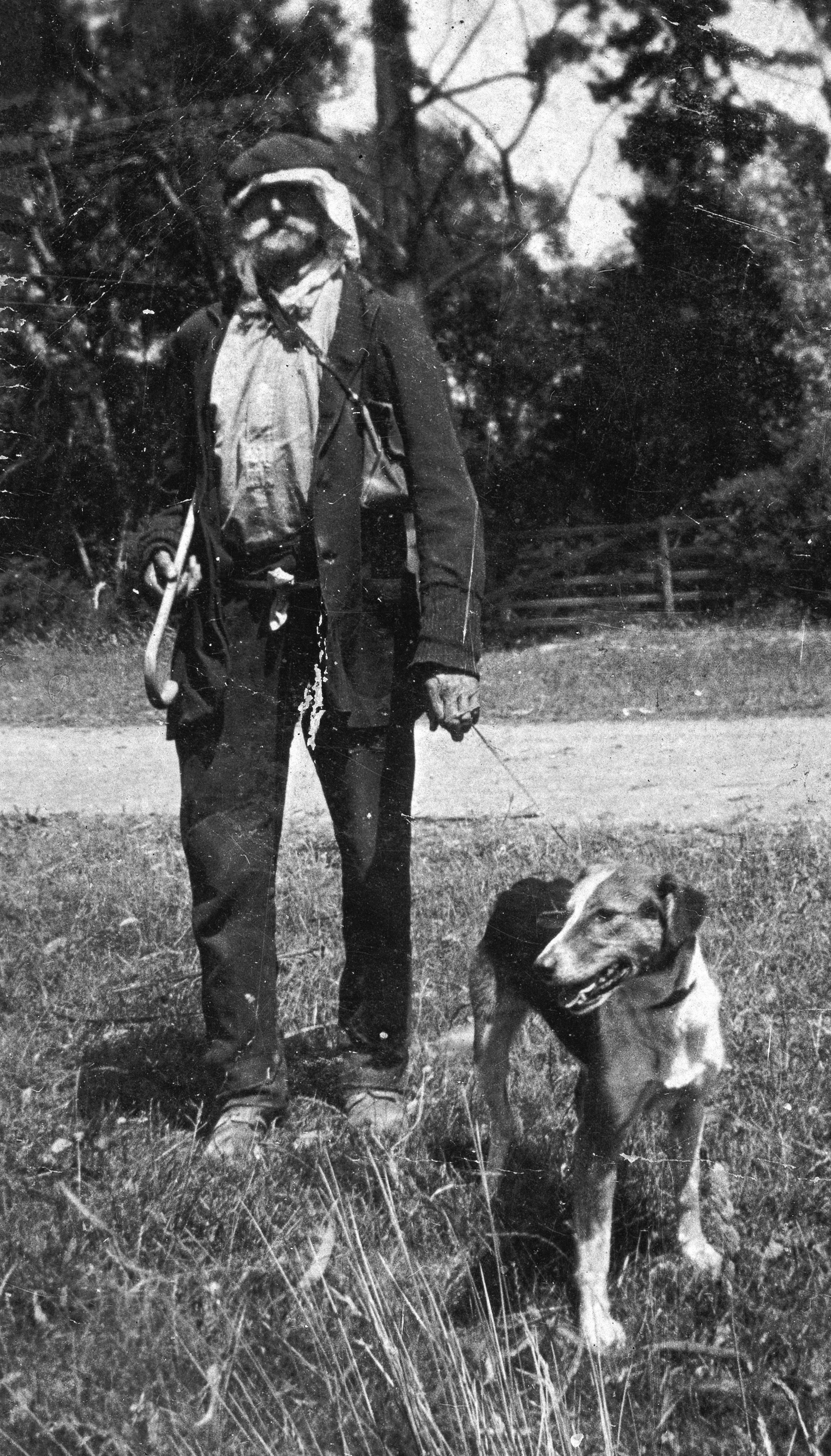
'The Shiner', a South Island swagman from the 1870s to the 1920s

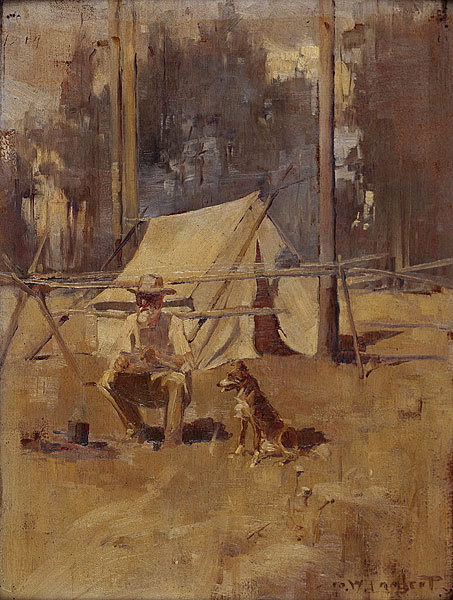
George Lambert, Sheoak Sam, 1898. Most swagmen travelled alone or with a dog.

Swagmen were often victims of circumstance who had found themselves homeless. Others were rovers by choice, or else they were on the run from police (bushrangers). Many were European or Asian migrants seeking fortune on the goldfields. One such swagman was Welshman Joseph Jenkins, who travelled throughout Victoria between 1869 and 1894, documenting his experiences in daily diary entries and through poetry. Swagmen ranged in age from teenagers to the elderly. Socialist leader John A. Lee's time as a swagman while a teenager informed his political writing, and also featured directly in some of his other books. Novelist Donald Stuart also began his life as a swagman at age 14. Several of his novels follow the lives of swagmen and Aboriginals in the Kimberley and Pilbara regions of Western Australia. Many swagmen interacted with Aboriginals along their travels; bushwear designer R. M. Williams spent his latter teen years as a swagman travelling across the Nullarbor Plain, picking up bushcraft and survival skills from local Aboriginal tribes such as cutting mulga, tracking kangaroos and finding water.

At times they would have been seen in and around urban areas looking for work or a handout. Most eyewitness descriptions of swagmen were written during the period when the country was 'riding on the sheep's back'. At this time, rovers were offered rations at police stations as an early form of the dole payment. They roamed the countryside finding work as sheep shearers or as farm hands. Not all were hard workers. Some swagmen known as sundowners would arrive at homesteads or stations at sundown when it was too late to work, taking in a meal and disappearing before work started the next morning. The New Zealand equivalent of a sundowner was known as a tussocker.

Most had few possessions as they were limited to what they could carry. Generally they had a swag (canvas bedroll), a tucker bag (bag for carrying food) and some cooking implements which may have included a billy can (tea pot or stewing pot). They carried flour for making damper and sometimes some meat for a stew.

In Henry Lawson's short story 'The Romance of the Swag', he describes in detail how to make a dinky-die (genuine) Aussie swag. Lawson states, 'Travelling with the swag in Australia is variously and picturesquely described as "humping bluey", "walking Matilda", "humping Matilda", "humping your drum", "being on the wallaby", "jabbing trotters", and "tea and sugar burglaring".'

Swagmen travelled with fellow 'swaggies' for periods, walking where they had to go, hitch hiking or stowing aboard cargo trains to get around. They would sleep on the ground next to a campfire, in hollowed out trees or under bridges.

== Popular culture ==
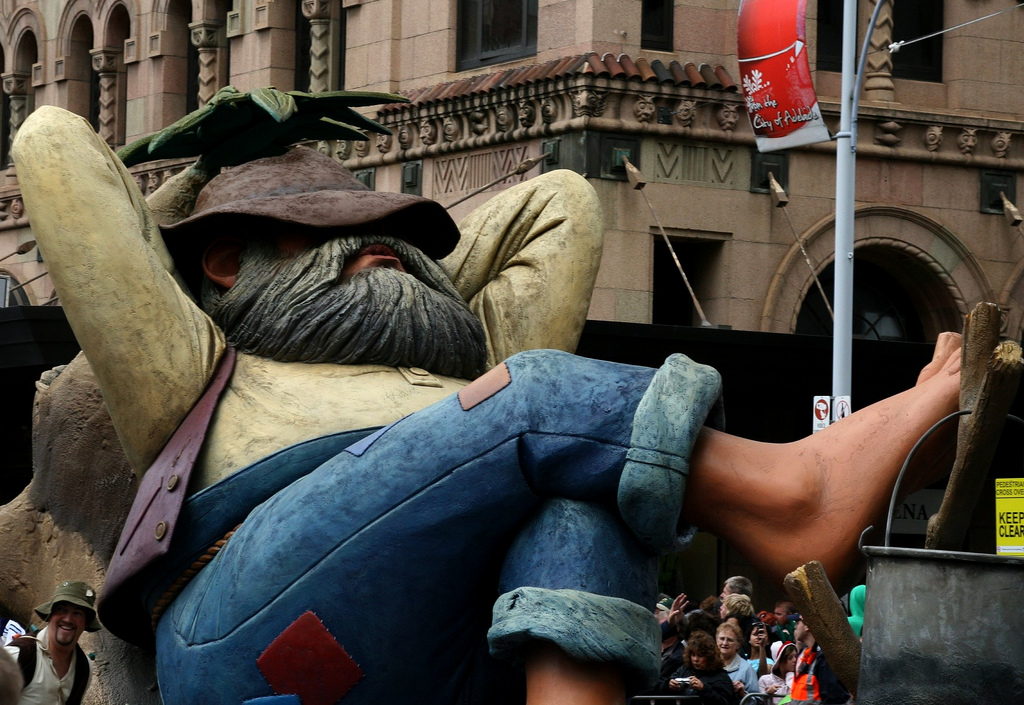
Swagman float at the 2008 Adelaide Christmas Pageant

In the 19th century, Australian bush poetry grew in popularity alongside an emerging sense of Australian nationalism. The swagman was venerated in poetry and literature as symbolic of Australian nationalistic and egalitarian ideals. Popular poems about swagmen include Henry Lawson's Out Back (1893) and Shaw Neilson's The Sundowner (1908). In 1902, Barbara Baynton published a collection of short stories titled Bush Studies. The final story, "The Chosen Vessel" (1896), gives an account of a woman alone in a bush dwelling, where she is preyed upon and eventually raped and murdered by a passing swagman. This was in stark contrast to traditional bush lore, where swagmen are depicted in distinctly romantic terms. Swagmen were also prominent in the works of those associated with the Jindyworobak Movement, including poet Roland Robinson, who was a swagman for much of his life before World War II.

Coinciding with trends in 19th-century Australian literature, swagmen were popular subjects of contemporary painters and illustrators. Drawings of swagmen, itinerant bush workers, rural nomads and other men "on the wallaby" were prevalent in newspapers and picturesque atlases. S.in a town T. Gill and James Alfred Turner popularised the open-air life of the swagman. By the 1880s, swagmen featured in the works of Tom Roberts, Walter Withers, Arthur Streeton, Frederick McCubbin, and other artists associated with the Melbourne-based Heidelberg School, which is customarily held to be the first distinctly Australian movement in Western art and the "golden age of national idealism" in Australian painting.

Swagmen and other characters of the bush were popular subjects of the silent film era of Australian cinema. Raymond Longford's 1914 The Swagman's Story starred Lottie Lyell. 1936's The Flying Doctor was directed by Miles Mander and starred Charles Farrell as a swagman travelling through the Blue Mountains towards Sydney. Swagmen have been the subject of numerous books, including the 1955 novel The Shiralee by D'Arcy Niland, which was made into a 1957 film, starring Peter Finch (who himself lived as a swagman during early adulthood), and a 1987 TV mini-series, starring Bryan Brown. Norman Kaye played the role of a swagman in the 1976 bushranger film Mad Dog Morgan. Arthur Upfield wrote a number of novels about swagmen including Death of a Swagman (1942), The Bushman Who Came Back (1957) and Madman's Bend (1963). In the 1981 film adaptation of Ethel Pedley's 1899 children's book Dot and the Kangaroo, a magical swagman helps Dot find Mother Kangaroo's lost joey. The Scottish singer-songwriter Alistair Hulett wrote a song about the 'swaggies' called "The Swaggies Have All Waltzed Matilda Away".

In the 1946 Sherlock Holmes film Dressed to Kill, a tune called "The Swagman", heard on an old music box, plays an important role in solving the mystery.

The Australian Batman villain Swagman derives his name from the term, but takes more conceptual inspiration from Australian bushranger Ned Kelly, who wore a suit of bulletproof armour during his final shootout with Australian law enforcement.

The phenomenon of swagmen in Aotearoa New Zealand, historically known through various figures nicknamed "Russian Jack"— a name given to several swagmen of Central and Eastern European origin — has been appropriated by American businessman Bill Foley, for his brand of wine.

=== List of swagman bush ballads ===
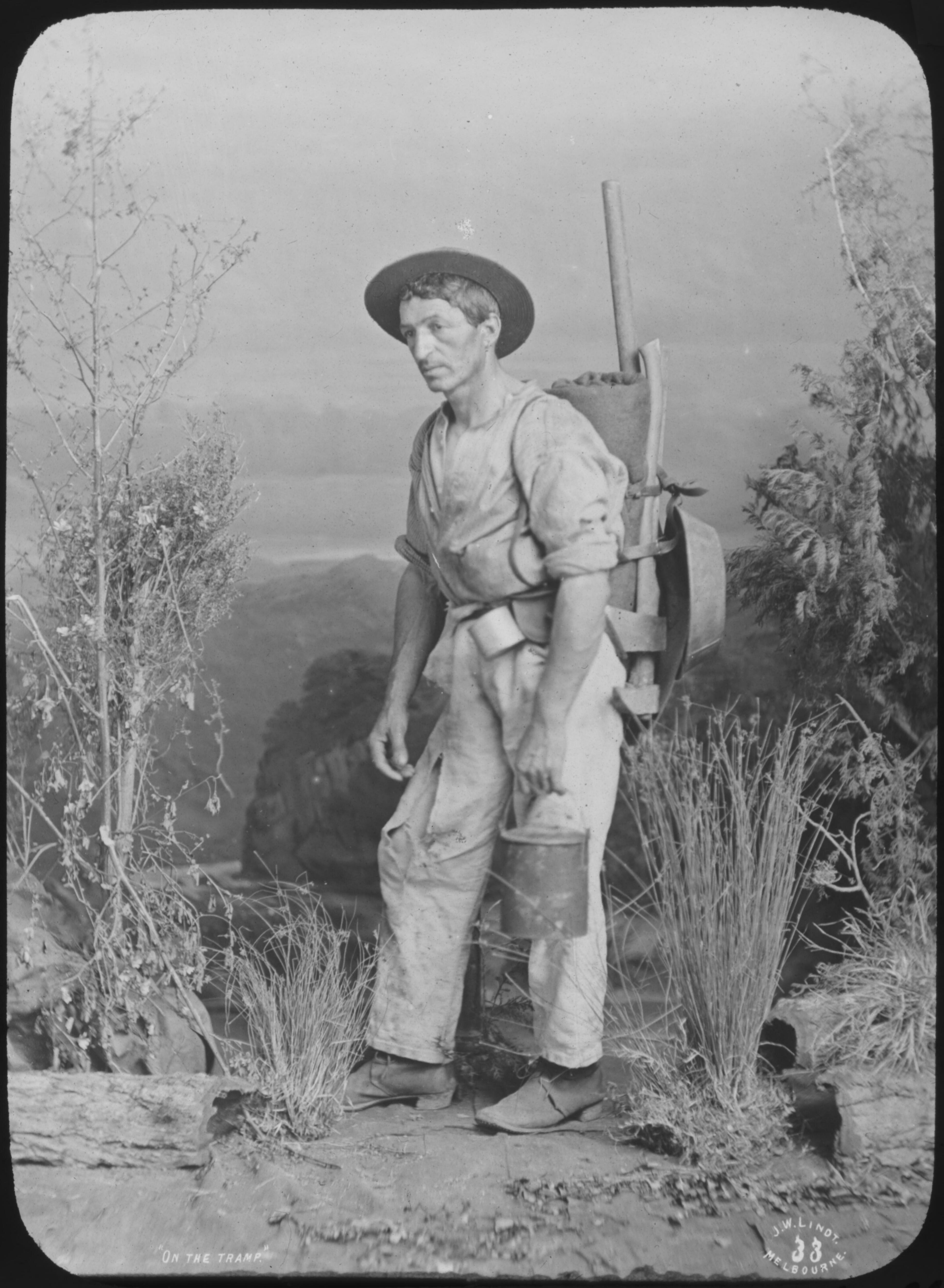
1887 studio portrait of a swagman by John William Lindt

- "Australia's on the Wallaby"
- "Four Little Johnny Cakes"
- "Humping Old Bluey"
- "My Old Black Billy"
- "The Old Bark Hut"
- "The Ramble-eer"
- "The Reedy Lagoon"
- "Snake Gully Swagger"
- "Waltzing Matilda"
- "With My Swag on My Shoulder"
