= Dead Men Running =

- Based on: Dead Men Running by D'arcy Niland
- Written by: Eric Tayler; Harold Lander
- Directed by: Eric Tayler
- Starring: Ewen Solon; Brendon Lunney; Diane Craig; Peter Gwynne
- Country of origin: Australia
- Original language: English
- No. of episodes: 6

Production
- Camera setup: Lloyd Shiels
- Running time: 35 mins

Original release
- Network: ABC
- Release: 10 February – 17 March 1971

Dead Men Running is a 1971 six-part Australian miniseries based on the final novel by D'Arcy Niland about the effect in Australia of the political troubles in Ireland early in the twentieth century.

== Premise ==
The adventures of an Irish migrant in an Australian country town in World War One.

== Cast ==
- Ewen Solon as Starkey Moore
- Brendon Lunney as Jo
- Diane Craig as Teresa Doherty
- Stewart Ginn as Matt Doherty
- John Fegan as Martin Walsh
- Bernadette Hughson as Prostitute
- Peter Reynolds
- Michael Boddy
- Don Crosby
- Graham Rouse
- Tom Farley
- Harry Lawrence
- John Armstrong
- Robert McDarra
- Chips Rafferty
- Ruth Cracknell
- Slim de Grey
- Doreen Warburton

=== Guests ===
- Moya O'Sullivan
- Peter Gwynne
- Irene Inescourt
- Max Cullen

== Production ==
Filming started in August 1970 in Gulgong, New South Wales.

== Broadcast ==
The first episode aired on the ABC on Wednesday 10 February 1971, with the final episode concluding on 17 March.

== Reception ==
The Sun-Herald said "what a first class piece it turned out to be."

The Age said the miniseries was "cast in the mould of My Brother Jack."

== Awards ==
The miniseries won a special award for Outstanding Creative Effort at the 1972 Logie Awards.
