= 1907 in Australian literature =

This article presents a list of the historical events and publications of Australian literature during 1907.

== Books ==
- Barbara Baynton – Human Toll
- E. J. Brady – The King's Caravan: Across Australia in a Wagon
- Ada Cambridge – The Eternal Feminine
- G. B. Lancaster
  - The Altar Stairs
  - The Tracks We Tread
- Ambrose Pratt
  - The Big Five
  - The Leather Mask
- Arthur Wright – Keane of Kalgoorlie

== Short stories ==
- W. R. Charleton – The Red Kangaroo and Other Australian Short Stories (edited)
- Edward Dyson – "At a Boxing Bout"
- Henry Lawson – "The Rising of the Court"
- Steele Rudd – The Poor Parson

== Poetry ==
- James Lister Cuthbertson
  - "The Australian Sunrise"
  - "Wattle and Myrtle"
- Victor Daley – "The Night Ride"
- Charles Harpur
  - "Love"
  - "Words"
- Henry Lawson — "The Bush Beyond the Range"
- Will Lawson – "A Song of Wind"
- Hugh McCrae
  - "Fantasy"
  - "Never Again"
- John Shaw Neilson
  - "In the Street"
  - "The Land Where I Was Born"
  - "Old Granny Sullivan"

== Births ==
A list, ordered by date of birth (and, if the date is either unspecified or repeated, ordered alphabetically by surname) of births in 1907 of Australian literary figures, authors of written works or literature-related individuals follows, including year of death.

- 4 May — Dorothy Sanders, romance novelist (died 1987)
- 21 July – A. D. Hope, poet and critic (died 2000)
- 7 August — Alexander Turner, poet, playwright, and theatre and radio producer (died 1993)
- 9 October – John O'Grady, novelist (died 1981)
- 18 November – Gwen Meredith, novelist and dramatist (died 2006)

Unknown date

- G. C. Bleeck – novelist (died 1971)
- Francis Brabazon, poet and member of Meher Baba's mandali (died 1984)

== Deaths ==
A list, ordered by date of death (and, if the date is either unspecified or repeated, ordered alphabetically by surname) of deaths in 1907 of Australian literary figures, authors of written works or literature-related individuals follows, including year of birth.

- 22 July – Francis Myers, poet (born ca. 1854)

== See also ==
- 1907 in Australia
- 1907 in literature
- 1907 in poetry
- List of years in Australian literature
- List of years in literature
