= Call Me When the Cross Turns Over =

Novel by D'Arcy Niland

- First edition
- Author: D'Arcy Niland
- Language: English
- Publisher: Angus & Robertson
- Publication date: 1957
- Publication place: Australia
- Pages: 255 pp
- Preceded by: The Shiralee
- Followed by: The Big Smoke

Call Me When the Cross Turns Over is a 1957 novel by Australian author D'Arcy Niland. It was his second full-length novel, following The Shiralee.

== Film Adaptation ==
Film rights were bought by Diane Cilento in 1962. A film version was announced in 1964 to be made in Australia by 20th Century Fox with Cilento and Sean Connery. In 1969 Peter Yates expressed interest in the movie. However no film resulted.
