= Deborah Niland =

Australian artist, writer (born 1950)

Deborah Niland (OAM)
- Born: Deborah Mary Niland; 1950 (age 75–76) Auckland, New Zealand
- Occupation: Artist, writer, illustrator
- Education: Julian Ashton Art School
- Genre: children's literature
- Notable awards: Art Gallery of New South Wales - Robert le Gay Brereton Award, North Sydney Art Prize
- Parents: D'Arcy Niland, Ruth Park
- Relatives: Kilmeny Niland (twin sister)

Deborah Mary Niland OAM (born 1950) is a New Zealand–born Australian artist, known as a writer and illustrator of children's books. Some of her most popular books include Annie's Chair, When The Wind Changed, Mulga Bill's Bicycle, and Chatterbox. In 2006 she won The Children's Book of the Year – Early Childhood, with her book Annie's Chair.

== Biography ==
Niland and her twin sister Kilmeny are the youngest of five children of Australian authors D'Arcy Niland and Ruth Park. Niland was born in Auckland, New Zealand and raised in Sydney, Australia.

Niland and her sister Kilmeny attended Julian Ashton Art School in The Rocks, Sydney. Here they studied drawing and painting, taught in the traditional manner, by J Richard Ashton.

Both began their art careers by freelancing. In London, they received illustration work from Transworld and their first full-length picture book, The Little Goat, was published in 1971. Niland and her sister Kilmeny worked together on thirteen books. Their best-known collaboration is an illustrated version of Mulga Bill's Bicycle, based on a poem written by A. B. (Banjo) Paterson. This classic picture book was first published in 1973, and has never been out of print. The newest edition is published by HarperCollins Australia.

Niland's early career as a book illustrator involved collaborations with author Ruth Park (When The Wind Changed (1980), Roger Bandy (1977) and The Gigantic Balloon (1975)) and author Jean Chapman (Velvet Paws and Whiskers (1979) and The Sugar Plum Christmas Book (1977)). Niland has both written and illustrated many children's titles including Annie's Chair (2005), The Big Green Thing (2008), and Let's Play (2007). Throughout her career, Niland has illustrated more than 50 titles.

In addition to book illustration, Niland has been a freelance contributor to The Australian Women's Weekly for over ten years, providing mainly humorous illustrations for articles and stories. Work for other magazines included Cleo, Family Circle, CHOICE and Reader's Digest.

When illustrating or painting, Niland uses a variety of materials, including pen and ink, coloured pencil, acrylic paint, water-colour, pencil and digital media.

Niland has continued to work in the fine arts, producing paintings for exhibitions and galleries. She has won several prizes, including The Robert le Gay Brereton Prize for Drawing, awarded by the Art Gallery of NSW and the North Sydney Art Prize (Open) 2009. Her work has been acquired by private and public collections.

== Published books ==
=== As author and illustrator ===
- My Spaghetti ABC (2021)
- It's Bedtime William! (2010)
- When Coco was a Kitten (2009)
- Double Trouble (2008)
- The Big Green Thing (2008)
- Annie to the Rescue (2007)
- Let's Play! (2007)
- When I was a Baby (2006)
- Annie's Chair (2005)
- Old MacDonald had an Emu (1986)
- ABC of Monsters (1975)
- Birds on a Bough (1975 with Kilmeny Niland)

=== As illustrator ===
- Ho Ho Ho There's a Hippopotamus on our Roof Eating Christmas Cake (2018)
- This Little Piggy Went Singing (2014)
- This Little Piggy Went Dancing (2013)
- The Tall Man and the Twelve Babies (2010)
- Hooray! There's a Hippopotamus on Our Roof Having a Birthday Party (2010)
- Grandpa Baby (2009)
- Chatterbox (2006)
- Guess What? There's A Hippopotamus on the Hospital Roof Eating Cake (1997, 2007)
- Look, There's A Hippopotamus in the Playground Eating Cake (1994, 2006)
- Hey Hippopotamus, Do Babies Eat Cake Too? (1992, 2007)
- James (1991)
- Families Are Funny (1990)
- My Hippopotamus Is On Our Caravan Roof Getting Sunburnt (1989, 2006)
- The Very Sniffy Dog (1989)
- All Australian Funny and Frightful Verse (1987)
- The Tall Book of Tall Tales (1985)
- Haunts and Taunts (1983)
- The Jacky Dandy Song Book (1982)
- Kneedeep (1981)
- The Zoo Alphabet (1980, with Kilmeny Niland)
- Fairy Strike (1980)
- When The Wind Changed (1980)
- There's a Hippopotamus On Our Roof Eating Cake (1980, 2005)
- The Drover's Dream (1979)
- Velvet Paws and Whiskers (1979)
- Tell Us Tales (1978, with Kilmeny Niland)
- Miss Strawberry Verses (1978)
- Roger Bandy (1977, 1987, with Kilmeny Niland)
- The Sugar Plum Songbook (1977)
- The Sugar Plum Christmas Book (1977)
- Tell Me Another Tale (1976, with Kilmeny Niland)
- Tumbling Jack and Other Rhymes (1976)
- The Gigantic Balloon. (1975, with Kilmeny Niland)
- Stuff & Nonsense (1974)
- What Am I ? (1974, with Kilmeny Niland)
- Animal Tales (1974)
- Tell Me A Tale (1974, with Kilmeny Niland)
- Mulga Bill's Bicycle (1973, 2007, with Kilmeny Niland)
- The Farm Alphabet (1973, with Kilmeny Niland)
- Riverview Kids (1971, with Kilmeny Niland)
- The Little Goat (1971, with Kilmeny Niland)
- Travelling Songs of Old Australia, (1966 with Kilmeny Niland, uncredited)

== Awards ==
Niland was awarded the Order of Australia Medal in the 2020 Australia Day Honours for "service to children's literature."

Niland has won a selection of awards for her picture-books.

=== Annie's Chair ===
(Author and Illustrator Deborah Niland)

- 2008 Winner KOALA Children's Choice Awards, Picture Storybooks
- 2008 Short Listed YABBA Children's Choice Awards, Picture Storybooks
- 2007 Short Listed BILBY Children's Choice Awards, Early Readers
- 2007 Short Listed YABBA Children's Choice Awards, Picture Storybooks
- 2007 Winner COOL Children's Choice Awards, Picture Storybooks
- 2007 Short Listed KOALA Children's Choice Awards. Picture Storybooks
- 2007 Koala Top 10 KOALA Children's Choice Awards, Picture Storybooks
- 2006 Winner Speech Pathology Australia, Best Book for Language Development: Young Children
- 2006 Winner CBCA Book of The Year: Early Childhood

=== Chatterbox ===
(Author Margaret Wild, Illustrator Deborah Niland)

- 2007 Shortlist CBCA Book of The Year: Early Childhood
- 2007 Honour Book CBCA Book of The Year: Early Childhood
- 2007 Winner CBCA Junior Judges Project: Early Childhood
- 2007 Winner YABBA Children's Choice Awards: Picture Storybooks
- 2007 Winner KOALA Children's Choice Awards: Picture Storybooks

=== When The Wind Changed ===
(Author Ruth Park, Illustrator Deborah Niland)

- 1996 Winner BILBY Award
- 1986 Winner YABBA Award
- 1981 Winner NSW Premier's Literary Award, Ethel Turner's Prize,

=== Mulga Bill's Bicycle ===
(Author A. B. Paterson, Illustrators Deborah and Kilmeny Niland)

- 1976 IBBY Certificate of Honour
- 1974 Winner Visual Arts Board Award
- 1973 Winner ABPA Book Design Award
