= Human Toll =

1907 novel by Barbara Baynton

- Author: Barbara Baynton
- Language: English
- Genre: Fiction
- Publisher: Duckworth Books
- Publication date: 1907
- Publication place: Australia
- Media type: Print
- Pages: 344p.
- Preceded by: -
- Followed by: -

Human Toll (1907) is a novel by Australian writer Barbara Baynton.

== Dedication ==
"Dedication: To Boshy's Lovey and mine."

== Synopsis ==
The novel follows a young bush girl, Ursula Ewart, after she is orphaned and removed from the station where she grew up, and from Boshy, the station hand. She is brought up in town by Mrs Irvine and later re-unites with Boshy as she nurses him through his final illness. She eventually returns to her home on the station. She is appalled by the treatment of a child by one of the women there and flees into the bush with it.

== Critical reception ==
Edward Garnett, writing for the Bookman and then reprinted in The Daily Telegraph noted: "The terrible earthiness of human instinct, the underlying egoism of our desires, the determining force of a mean environment, the gauntness and squalidness of decivilised Australian life, are portrayed remorselessly in the figures of half a dozen characters...There is nothing in recent English fiction that is so psychologically remarkable as this book. It is an unequal performance, fragmentary and uncertain in some of its effects, perhaps a little too nebulous and confused here, and a little too overstrained there. But it is a work of genius indisputably, disconcertingly sinister, extraordinarily actual."

In the Melbourne Herald a reviewer was taken by the sense of realism in the work: "...the truthfulness of the writer is undeniable, and there be many in Australia who can bear witness to it. After all, too, the squalor and misery which, in these places, would seem to be regarded as mere matters of daily life, is more than equalled in some parts of Merrle England, and the 'toll' of human misery exacted for an existence is often greater than is described even in this terribly realistic work. There is certainly no romance about it. It is almost horrible in some of its realism, but it is none the less attractive..."

== Publication history ==
After its original publication in 1907 in England by publishers Duckworth Books the novel was not re-published until:

- Barbara Baynton edited by Sally Krimmer and Alan Lawson University of Queensland Press, Australia, 1980 (note: this was a collection of Baynton's works.
- University of Sydney Library, Scholarly Electronic Text and Image Service (SETIS), 2000

== See also ==
- 1907 in Australian literature
