= Kilmeny Niland =

Australian artist

- Born: 1950; Auckland, New Zealand
- Died: 27 February 2009 (aged 58–59); Sydney, New South Wales, Australia
- Occupations: Artist and book illustrator
- Known for: Children's book illustrations
- Spouse: Rafe Champion
- Parent(s): Ruth Park and D'Arcy Niland
- Website: www.kilmenyniland.com

Kilmeny Niland (1950 – 27 February 2009) was a New Zealand–born Australian artist and illustrator. While best known for her children's book illustrations, she worked in a wide range of genres, including animation, wildlife art, miniatures, portraits, cards and prints. She won numerous prizes in national and international competitions, and one of her portraits was purchased by Australia's National Portrait Gallery, in Canberra.

With her twin sister Deborah, she illustrated a children's version of Banjo Paterson's poem Mulga Bill's Bicycle.

== Life ==
Kilmeny Niland and her twin sister Deborah were born in Auckland, New Zealand, to New Zealand–born Australian author Ruth Park and her husband, the author and journalist D'Arcy Niland. She had three older siblings: Anne, Rory and Patrick, who had been born in Australia.

The family returned to Sydney and lived in Neutral Bay and then Balgowlah Heights. The twins were educated at Saint Cecilia's Primary School and Stella Maris College. Both then studied art at Julian Ashton Art School.

Their father died in 1967, and some time after their mother took them to London with their brother Patrick, who had been offered a place at the Royal Academy of Music.

Kilmeny Niland married writer and researcher Rafe Champion in 1979. They had four sons: Leo, Hugh, Patrick and Tom.

She was diagnosed with breast cancer in 1991. In May 2008, she was diagnosed with non-Hodgkin's lymphoma, and died of the disease in February 2009.

== Career ==
Kilmeny and Deborah started their careers by working freelance in London. Their first collaboration, The Little Goat, was published in 1971. By this time, the sisters were back in Australia, living in Cremorne, Sydney. They collaborated on eleven more books. They also worked on animation at Eric Porter's studios in Sydney.

During her lifetime, she published 47 books: 12 were illustrated by her with Deborah, 13 were written and illustrated by her, and 34 were texts by others which she illustrated.

== Awards and nominations ==
- Visual Arts Board award, 1974, for Mulga Bill's Bicycle (with Deborah)
- IBBY Honour Diploma, Illustration, 1976 for Mulga Bill's Bicycle
- Whitley Awards, Best Children's Book, 1980, for Feathers, Fur and Frills
- Faber Castell Grand Prize at the Combined Australian Societies of Miniature Art, 2000

== Works ==
=== As illustrator ===
- An Aussie Night Before Christmas (2005)
- Blossom Possum : The Sky is Falling Down-under (2006)
- Callie's Castle (1985)
- Callie's Family (1988)
- Clancy of the Overflow (2002)
- Fair Dinkum Aussie Christmas (2007)
- Fairy Tale Picture Dictionary (1979)
- Fey Mouse (1988)
- The Gigantic Balloon (1975, with Deborah Niland)
- The Gingerbread Man (2006)
- Grandad Barnett's Beard (1988)
- How Many Dogs in the House? (2004)
- Just Like That (1986)
- Matthew and the New Baby (1986)
- Mulga Bill's Bicycle (1973, with Deborah Niland)
- My brother John (1990)
- Old Witch Boneyleg (1978)
- One-eyed Jack and Other Rhymes (1975)
- Pancakes & Painted Eggs : A Book for Easter and All the Days of the Year (1981)
- Riverview Kids (1971, with Deborah Niland)
- Roger Bandy (1977, with Deborah Niland)
- Sheep shape (1992)
- Tell Me a Tale : Stories, Songs, Verses and Things To Do (1974, with Deborah Niland)
- Tell Me Another Tale : Stories, Verses, Songs and Things To Do (1976, with Deborah Niland)
- The Farm Alphabet (1973, with Deborah Niland,)
- The Haunted Castle (1979)
- The Land and the Spirit : An Australian Alphabet (1992)
- The Little Goat (1971, with Deborah Niland)
- The Ugly Duckling (2006)
- The Window Book (1992)
- The Zoo Alphabet (1980, with Deborah Niland)
- Travelling Songs of Old Australia (1966, with Deborah Niland, uncredited)
- Wishbone (2002)
- What Am I? (1974, with Deborah Niland)

=== As author and illustrator ===
- Animals at Home (1995)
- Animals at Large (1995)
- Animals at Play (1994)
- Animals at Work (1994)
- An Aussie Day before Christmas (2008)
- A Bellbird in a Flame Tree (1989)
- Birds on a Bough : A Counting Book (1975, with Deborah Niland)
- Bright Eyes and Bushy Tails (1984)
- Fat Pat (2008)
- Feathers, Fur and Frills (1980)
- My World (1981)
- Two Bad Teddies (2009)
- Two Tough Teddies (2007)

=== As author ===
- The Tall Man and the Twelve Babies (2010, with Tom Niland Champion)
