= Australia–Ireland relations =

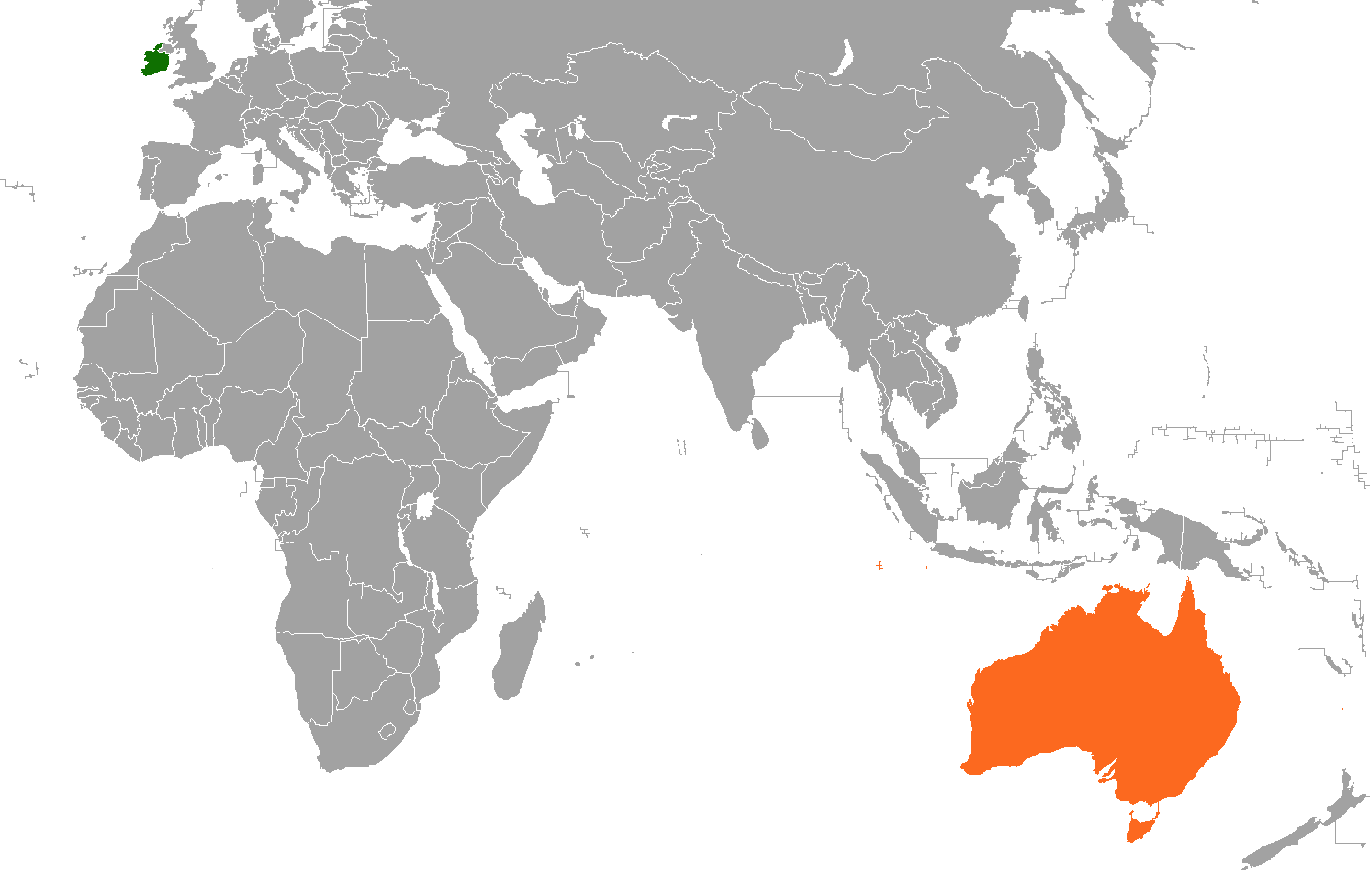

- Ireland: Australia

Diplomatic relations exist between Australia and Ireland. Australia and Ireland share a historical connection and remained part of the British Empire until their respective independence. Over 300,000 Irish settlers migrated to Australia to escape poverty in their homeland and over 2 million Australian citizens claim Irish ancestry. Australia has an embassy in Dublin, while Ireland has an embassy in Canberra and a consulate-general in Sydney. Both nations are mutual members of the Australia Group, Organisation for Economic Co-operation and Development and the United Nations.

== History ==
The first known Irish to arrive to Australia came with the First Fleet in 1791 when Britain shipped 155 Irish convicts to Australia after the British government created a penal colony in New South Wales. A further 7000 Irish convicts would be shipped to Australia. Between 1840 and 1914, over 300,000 Irish migrated to Australia. A majority were Catholic and the Australian Catholic Church was largely Irish-led from 1870 to 1940. Both Irish and Australian soldiers fought side by side for the British Empire during the Second Boer War (1899–1902) and World War I (1914–1918), and especially during the Gallipoli Campaign. The Irish Free State secured substantial independence from Britain in 1922 as a result of the Anglo-Irish War, and was formally declared a republic in 1949. Australia achieved independence from Britain in stages, beginning with federation in 1901 and culminating with the last removal of legislative ties via the Australia Act of 1986.

== Post-independence ==
In 1941, Australian Prime Minister Robert Menzies became the first Australian Prime Minister to visit Ireland and he met with Irish Taoiseach Éamon de Valera. Both nations opened resident diplomatic missions in their respective capitals in 1946. The title accorded to the Irish head of mission was ‘Minister Plenipotentiary Representative of Ireland in Australia’ as distinct from High Commissioner which was an “important terminological change” for Ireland.

During World War II, Ireland remained neutral while Australia fought alongside the British and allies during the war. In April 1948, Éamon de Valera travelled to Australia for a six-week tour seeking support for a united Ireland as six counties of Northern Ireland wished to remain part of the United Kingdom. However, de Valera's trip was unsuccessful as many Australian born Irish and migrants were not interested in the affairs of Ireland or had lost contact with their home nation. During The Troubles which began in the late 1960s in Northern Ireland, there was much sympathy from Australia to both the Republic of Ireland and Northern Ireland which led to the formation of an ‘’Australian Aid for Ireland Organization’’. In 2000, Ireland opened a consulate-general in Sydney. Both nations have a Working holiday visa agreement.

The Irish Echo announced that an Irish consulate will be opening in Melbourne. The Melbourne Irish community has long argued for a full-time diplomatic base in the city.

== High-level visits ==
High-level visits from Australia to Ireland

- Prime Minister Robert Menzies (1941)
- Prime Minister Gough Whitlam (1974)
- Prime Minister Bob Hawke (1987)
- Prime Minister Paul Keating (1993)
- Prime Minister John Howard (2006)

High-level visits from Ireland to Australia

- President Patrick Hillery (1985)
- Taoiseach Charles Haughey (1988)
- President Mary McAleese (1998, 2003)
- Taoiseach Bertie Ahern (2000)
- President Michael D. Higgins (2017)

== Trade ==
In 2016, trade between Australia and Ireland totalled $2.4 billion Australian dollars. Australia exported approximately $71 million Australian dollars to Ireland with main exports including: medicaments, alcoholic beverages, sugar, molasses and honey and medical instruments. Ireland exported $2.384 billion Australian dollars' worth of goods to Australia, with the main exports including: medicaments, manufactured articles, pharmaceutical products and computers. Australia is Ireland's 15th-biggest export trading partner globally, while at the same time, Australia is Ireland's 44th-largest import source.

Monthly value of Australian merchandise exports to Ireland (A$ millions) since 1988

Monthly value of Irish merchandise exports to Australia (A$ millions) since 1988

== Resident diplomatic missions ==
- Australia has an embassy in Dublin
- Ireland has an embassy in Canberra and a consulate-general in Sydney.
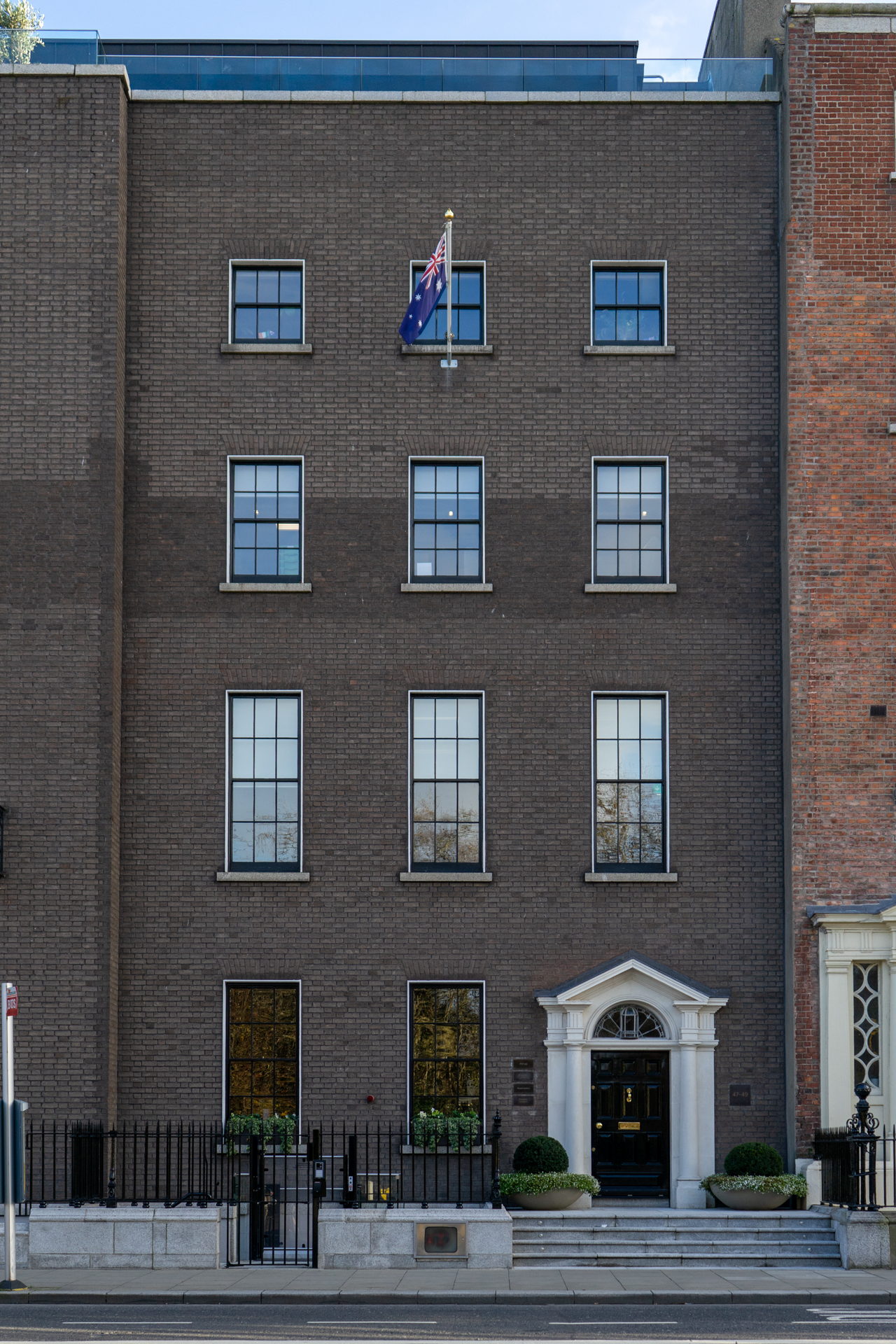
Embassy of Australia in Dublin

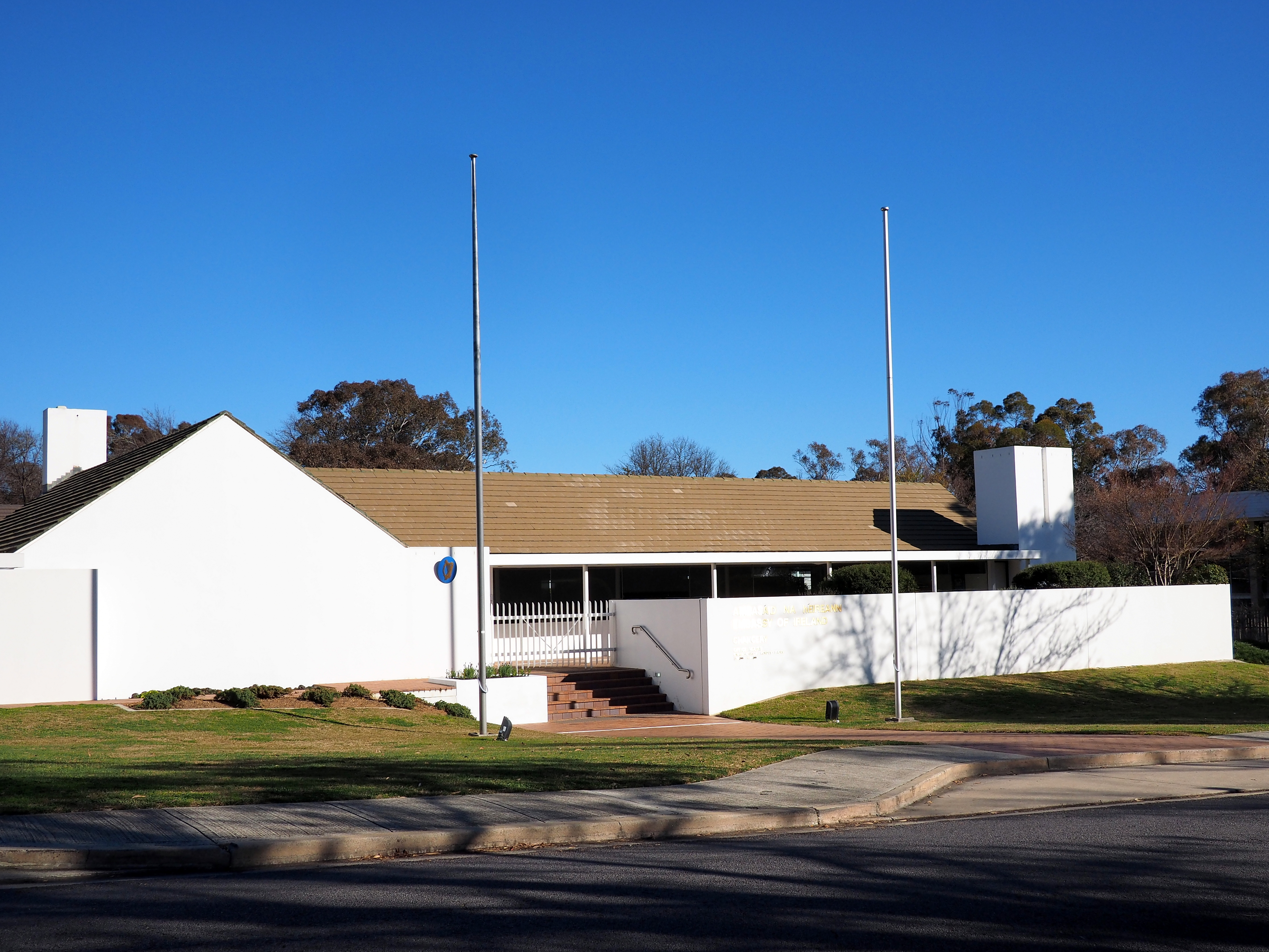
Embassy of Ireland in Canberra

== See also ==
- Embassy of Australia, Dublin
- Irish Australians
- International Rules Series
