= The Chosen Vessel =

Short story by Barbara Baynton

- Short story by Barbara Baynton
- Original title: The Tramp
- Country: Australia
- Language: English
- Genre: Drama

Publication
- Published in: The Bulletin; Bush Studies
- Media type: Print: · magazine; · short story anthology
- Publication date: 12 December 1896

"The Chosen Vessel" is a dramatic short story by the Australian writer Barbara Baynton, first published in The Bulletin on 12 December 1896, under the story's original title "The Tramp". It recounts the story of an outback woman left alone with her baby in a bush hut as she awaits attack by a swagman who has called there during the day.

The story was subsequently published in the author's 1902 collection Bush Studies, under the preferred title and with some previously excised scenes restored.

== Plot summary ==
"The Chosen Vessel" is the story of a young mother and baby who are left home alone in the isolating Australian Bush. When a swagman stops by one day looking for food, the mother provides him with some. He then goes and sets up camp near her home. Later that night he returns to the mother's home and begins to break in. In the distance the mother hears a horse and runs to try and get help, however the horseman continues on without aiding her. The swagman then catches her, resulting in her rape and murder.

The last part of the story has Peter Hennessey find the woman as he heads to town to vote. But he believes the mother to be Virgin Mary and a sign from God that he should change his vote to that of his mother's choice and continues to ride on. Later that day he goes and talks to the priest about his vision and the priest tells him what he really saw.

== Analysis ==
The Brisbane Courier stated that the story came "to paint the backblocks in the colours of hell. Compare this horrible nightmare with Lawson's '"The Drover's Wife," and you will realise the difference between the relentless, the strained, and the terrible, and that which is human." The Oxford Companion to Australian Literature noted that the story is "reminiscent of Henry Lawson's "The Drover's Wife"."

In her collection of critical essays on Australian literature, Australian Classics: 50 great writers and their celebrated works, Jane Gleeson-White notes that the second section of the story, about Peter Hennessey who sees a vision of the Virgin and Child in the moonlight, was cut by AG Stephens before the story's publication in The Bulletin. Gleeson-White goes on to point out that Baynton's version of "the bush" is one to fear, where women in particular have to live under the threat of violence, and are generally appreciated only for their looks and their capacity for work.

== Critical reception ==
Early reviews of the collection Bush Studies were not kind. The Clarence and Richmond Examiner stated, "If Barbara Baynton's manuscript had got into the hands of Colonial editors the expression would never have been allowed to appear in print; but being dealt with by Englishmen, who are not expected to be versed in Australian bush etymology, it has been allowed to pass." They concluded that the stories were "superfluous exaggerations and misconceived ideas of youthful inexperience".

The Australian Town and Country Journal went further by stating, "It seems a pity that a writer with Barbara Baynton's keen observation, incisive pen, and dramatic sense, should not turn her powers to better account than she has done in Bush Studies", later referring to the stories as "harrowing" and "mercilessly tragic".

== Further publication ==
- Cobbers by Barbara Baynton (1917), Collection of eight short stories [six reprinted from Bush Studies with two new stories]
- Australian Short Stories edited by George Mackaness (1928)
- Australian Round-Up : Stories From 1790 to 1950 edited by Colin Roderick (1953)
- It Could Be You edited by Hal Porter (1972)
- The Old Bulletin Reader : The Best Stories from The Bulletin 1881-1901 (1973)
- Australian Horror Stories edited by Bill Wannan (1983)
- Macquarie PEN Anthology of Australian Literature edited by Nicholas Jose, Kerryn Goldsworthy, Anita Heiss, David McCooey, Peter Minter, Nicole Moore and Elizabeth Webby (2009)
- Macabre : A Journey Through Australia's Darkest Fears edited by Angela Challis and Marty Young (2010)
