= Dead Men Running (novel) =

1969 novel written by D'Arcy Niland

- First edition
- Author: D'Arcy Niland
- Language: English
- Publisher: Hodder & Stoughton, London
- Publication date: 1969
- Media type: Print
- Pages: 315 pp
- ISBN: 0718106784
- Preceded by: The Apprentices
- Followed by: –

Dead Men Running (1969) is the final novel by Australian writer D'Arcy Niland. It was published posthumously.

== Plot summary ==
Set during the years 1910 to 1916, the novel follows the story of Starkey Moore, a loner living in the small outback town of Hope, who discovers a young man collapsed by the side of a road in a storm. Moore nurses the young Joey back to health and proceeds to teach him a number of life lessons.

== Critical reception ==
Ian Hicks, writing in The Canberra Times, was impressed with the book: "After my first reading of Dead Men Running, I had an overwhelming feeling of disappointment that there would be nothing more from the pen of D'Arcy Niland. But look at it from another viewpoint. How fortunate a man to have died, leaving behind a book as good as this. Make no mistake, it is a statement of fact, not of opinion nor of sympathy, to assert that this is a great novel."

== See also ==
- 1969 in Australian literature

== Notes ==
- Dedication: For his friends
- The novel was initially refused transmission by post by the Postmaster-General's Department after the "department had objected to a four-letter word used by a cockatoo in the novel." Later: "Announcing the lifting of the ban yesterday, the Postmaster-General, Mr Hulme, said that having checked on the general nature of the book, and having taken into account the types of books which have been passed by censoring authorities, the department had decided against the ban."

== 1971 TV adaptation ==
The novel was adapted for television by the Australian Broadcasting Corporation in 1971.
