= The Big Smoke (novel) =

1959 novel written by D'Arcy Niland

- First edition
- Author: D'Arcy Niland
- Language: English
- Publisher: Angus and Robertson
- Publication date: 1959
- Media type: Print
- Pages: 224 pp
- Preceded by: Call Me When the Cross Turns Over
- Followed by: Gold in the Streets

The Big Smoke (1959) is a novel by Australian writer D'Arcy Niland.

== Plot summary ==
Set in Sydney in the early part of the twentieth century, the novel is a series of stories told from the perspective of people associated with the son of an indigenous boxer, Chiddy Hay.

== Critical reception ==
On its original publication in the USA Kirkus Review found: "The conglomerate that makes up a big city, from aboriginal to white, evil to good, and youth to age, has a sense of panorama, always colored by the Big Smoke, which is seen and recorded with observant detail."

== See also ==
- 1959 in Australian literature
