= The Shiralee (novel) =

Book by D'Arcy Niland

- First UK edition
- Author: D'Arcy Niland
- Language: English
- Publisher: Angus & Robertson (Australia/UK); William Sloane Associates (USA)
- Publication date: 1955
- Publication place: Australia
- Pages: 223 pp
- Preceded by: –
- Followed by: Call Me When the Cross Turns Over

The Shiralee is the debut full-length novel by D'Arcy Niland published in 1955. It was adapted into a movie in 1957 and a mini series in 1987.

== Plot ==
The swagman Macauley takes his young daughter Buster on the road with him.

== Reception ==
It sold more than 90,000 copies in Australia.

Australian newspaper The Argus called it a "great Australian novel".

The New York Times called it a "fine story" which Niland "told well... Mr Niland's approach is honest as it is refreshing... one wants to hear more from him".

== Adaptations ==
Film rights were sold in 1955 for a reported £10,000.

In 1957 a British film was made by Ealing Studios, directed by Leslie Norman and starred Peter Finch.

A second adaptation was made in 1987. It was an Australian TV film directed by George Ogilvie, starring Bryan Brown and Noni Hazelhurst.

A stage adaptation was made by Kate Mulvany for the Sydney Theatre Company in 2025.

== Notes ==
- Dedication: This book is for my Mother / Barbara Lucy Niland
- Epigraph: Consists of an extract from a poem 'The Ballad of the Shiralee', by Ruth Park.
