= Bush Studies =

Book by Barbara Baynton

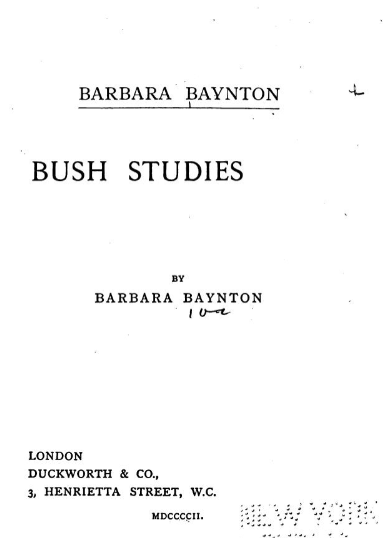
- Title page for Bush Studies (1902)
- Author: Barbara Baynton
- Language: English
- Genre: short stories
- Publisher: Duckworth
- Publication date: 1902
- Pages: 155 pp

Bush Studies is a short story collection by Barbara Baynton that presents Australian bush life in the early colonial period as dangerous and isolating for the women.

== Analysis ==
Baynton's short stories and novel were noted at the time of their publication, and since, for their grim realism and depiction of female suffering. In contrast to other writers of "pioneer bush" narratives, this suffering is portrayed by Baynton as arising not only from the harsh environment, but from male attitudes and power. This represents an alternative view to the romanticism of the bush and "mateship" propagated through periodicals such the Bulletin, and by bush balladeers such as Henry Lawson and Banjo Patterson.

Bush Studies was first published in London in 1902, as Bayton was unable to find an Australian publisher.

== Contents ==
- "A Dreamer"
- "Squeaker's Mate"
- "Scrammy 'And"
- "Billy Skywonkie"
- "Bush Church"
- "The Chosen Vessel"

== Other works (selected) ==
=== Novel ===
- Human Toll (1907)

=== Collections ===
- Cobbers (1917)

=== Individual works ===
- Fragments: 1 Day-Birth (1899) - poem
- A Dreamer (1902) - short story
