= Barbara Baynton =

Australian writer (1857–1929)

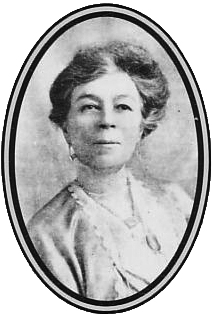
- Barbara Baynton, c. 1892
- Born: 4 June 1857 Scone, New South Wales, Australia
- Died: 28 May 1929 (aged 71) Toorak, Victoria, Australia
- Spouse: Alexander Frater (m. 1880; div. 1890) Thomas Baynton (m. 1890; died 1904) Lord Headley (m. 1921; sep. 1925)

Barbara Baynton (4 June 1857 – 11 February 1929) was an Australian author. Born to a working-class family in Scone in 1857, she eventually married a wealthy retired surgeon and became a successful writer and businesswoman. Her best known literary work, the short story collection Bush Studies, was published in 1902 and was positively received by contemporary critics. Baynton became Lady Headley as a result of her brief third marriage to Rowland Allanson-Winn, 5th Baron Headley. She died in Melbourne in 1929.

Literary scholars have interpreted Baynton as a "dissident figure" whose critical portrayals of the Australian bush contrast with its dominant depictions by the nationalist authors of her era. Baynton's fiction was written in a realist, modernist style, and depicts the harshness of bush life and the mistreatment of women and children by men in the bush.

== Biography ==
=== Early life ===
Barbara Baynton was born on 4 June 1857 in Scone, New South Wales. Her parents, who had immigrated to Australia from Ireland in 1840, were the carpenter John Lawrence and his wife Elizabeth (née Ewart). Barbara later claimed that her real father was a cavalry officer named Robert Lawrence Kilpatrick. Her biographer and great-granddaughter Penne Hackforth-Jones suggests that Barbara's mother Elizabeth may have indeed left her husband John shortly after their arrival in Australia and entered into a long-term cohabitation with Kilpatrick, who took the real John Lawrence's name.

Barbara did not receive a formal schooling and was educated at home. As a teenager she was employed as a governess for a family living on a property near Quirindi. In 1880, she married a selector named Alexander Frater, the son of the family for whom she was working as a governess, in Tamworth.

=== Writing career ===
After her marriage Barbara and her husband moved to Coonamble. She gave birth to three children during her first marriage: two sons and one daughter. During her third pregnancy she invited her niece Sarah to assist with the household labour; Sarah and Alexander began an affair, and in 1887, Barbara discovered their relationship and moved to Sydney with her children. Around this time she briefly worked as a milliner in rural New South Wales. She began working as a housekeeper in Sydney and filed for divorce, which was granted in 1890. The following day she married her employer, the 70-year-old retired surgeon Thomas Baynton, at St Philip's Church.

Following her marriage, Barbara developed an interest in antiques and other collectibles. She also began to publish fiction, non-fiction, and poetry in The Bulletin, and developed a close friendship with its editor Alfred Stephens. Barbara wrote a collection of six short stories but was unable to persuade a publisher in Sydney to take on the work. During a visit to London in 1902, she secured publication of the collection, titled Bush Studies, with Duckworth & Company. The collection was positively received in both England and in Australia upon its release. It features six stories written in a realist style that depict the challenges and loneliness of life in the Australian bush. Barbara's connections in Sydney also allowed her to integrate herself into British high society during her 1902 visit, including securing an invitation to the coronation of King Edward VII.

In 1904, Barbara's second husband died and left her his estate. Their one son together had died as an infant. After her husband's death, Barbara became a trader of antiques and began to invest on the stock exchange, eventually becoming the chairman of directors of the Law Book Company of Australasia. She also wrote regularly for newspapers on issues concerning women. She spent the majority of her time living in London, where she developed connections with many of her fellow Australians living in the city. One of these friends was the writer Martin Boyd, who likely based some characters in his later novels on Barbara. Barbara supported varied social and political causes; while she was an early member of the New South Wales Womanhood Suffrage League, she later campaigned against granting women the right to vote. She also supported unionisation efforts and the rights of single mothers.

In 1907, Barbara published her only novel, Human Toll. The novel was poorly received by contemporary critics and remained obscure until it was republished in 1980. She released a new edition of Bush Studies titled Cobbers in 1917 featuring two new stories; the collection was marketed in London towards the large number of Australian soldiers stationed in the city during the First World War.

=== Later life and death ===
On 11 February 1921, Barbara married Rowland Allanson-Winn, 5th Baron Headley, an engineer and convert to Islam. In 1922, he entered into bankruptcy. He was offered the Albanian throne but refused, after which Barbara left him and moved to Melbourne. In her later years, Barbara lived between Australia and England. She died following a fall of cerebral thrombosis and pneumonia in Toorak, Melbourne, on 28 May 1929. She was buried at Waverley Cemetery in Sydney.

== Writing and legacy ==
Modern literary scholars have interpreted Baynton as a "dissident figure" whose writing highlights the harshness of life in the Australian bush. They contrast her representations of the bush with the more sentimental and romantic portrayals of writers like Henry Lawson and Banjo Paterson. The literary scholar Leigh Dale describes Baynton as a "chronicler of her culture's most brutal truths". Baynton's writing often depicts the brutality of men in the bush, particularly towards women, and has been contrasted with the heroic portrayals of the bushman in the nationalist fiction of her contemporaries. The scholar Alan Lawson argues that Baynton's work was at the centre of an academic re-evaluation of 1890s literature, contributing to "counter-canonical and feminist readings of nationalist realism" during the 1960s and 1970s.

Baynton's writing employs a realist, modernist style and a detached authorial voice. Franklin describes her writing as an ironic satire of the bush fiction genre and writes that it is distinguished by its intense psychological character examinations. The scholar Rosemary Moore writes that Baynton's writing is challenging to its readers, both due to its tension with the dominant depictions of the bush in Australian literature, and due to its "fractured narratives" and lack of a clear authorial voice. Lawson argues that Baynton's fiction is disturbing and confronting for its readers, as it forces them to re-evaluate the ways in which the bush has typically been represented in Australian literature. Moore writes that her writing has an undercurrent of anger at the harm caused by men towards women and children, including through drunkenness, rape, incest, and adultery. To the scholar Carol Franklin, Baynton's writing challenges the "masculinist bush ethos", while employing critical reframings of the motifs of nationalist bush writing.

Many of the facts of Baynton's life, including her parentage and marriages, remained uncertain until the publication of an article on Baynton by Sally Krimmer in 1976. A collection of her writing, including the first reprint of Human Toll, was published in 1980 and led to renewed critical interest in her work. A biography of Baynton titled Barbara Baynton: Between Two Worlds was published by Penne Hackforth-Jones, Baynton's great-granddaughter, in 1989.

== Selected works ==
=== Novel ===
- Human Toll (1907)

=== Collections ===
- Bush Studies (1902)
- Cobbers (1917)

=== Major individual works ===
- The Chosen Vessel (1896) - short story
- Fragments: 1 Day-Birth (1899) - poem
- A Dreamer (1902) - short story
- Billy Skywonkie (1902) - short story
