= D'Arcy Niland =

Australian novelist and short story writer

- Born: Darcy Francis Niland; 20 October 1917; Glen Innes, New South Wales, Australia
- Died: 29 March 1967 (aged 49); Darlinghurst, New South Wales, Australia
- Resting place: Northern Suburbs cemetery, Sydney
- Education: Sisters of St Joseph of the Sacred Heart, Glen Innes
- Occupations: Farm labourer; novelist; short story writer
- Spouse: Rosina Ruth Park (1942–1967)
- Children: Anne; Rory; Patrick; Kilmeny (1950–2009); Deborah (1950-present)
- Relatives: Francis Augustus Niland (father); Barbara Lucy, née Egan (mother)
- Writing career
- Notable work: The Shiralee

D'Arcy Francis Niland (20 October 1917 – 29 March 1967) was an Australian farm labourer, novelist and short story writer. In 1955 he wrote The Shiralee, which gained international recognition in its depictions of the experiences of a swagman and his four-year-old daughter. It was made into a 1957 film, starring Peter Finch, and a 1987 TV mini-series, starring Bryan Brown. Niland married fellow writer Ruth Park (1917–2010) on 11 May 1942 and the couple had five children: Anne (born ca. June 1943), Rory, Patrick and twin daughters, Kilmeny (1950–2009) and Deborah (1950–present). Niland died on 29 March 1967 of a myocardial infarction, aged 49.

== Early life ==
D'Arcy Niland was born Darcy Francis Niland on 20 October 1917 in the rural town of Glen Innes, New South Wales. His father Francis Augustus Niland was a cooper and wool classer, and his mother was Barbara Lucy, née Egan. He was the eldest of six children in the Irish-Catholic family. Niland was named by his father after the boxer, Les Darcy (1895–1917), he changed the form of his first name to D'Arcy as an adult. He attended the Sisters of St Joseph of the Sacred Heart school in Glen Innes.

Niland left school at 14 and two years later he briefly worked in Sydney as a copy boy for The Sun newspaper, hoping to become a reporter. His poem "Old Folks' Christmas", was printed in December 1934 and was followed by "My Country" in March 1935 in The Sydney Morning Herald. In December 1935 he wrote an article, "Lore and Legends of the Christmas Tree", for the same newspaper. The Great Depression ended this avenue of employment, however, and for some years he travelled the country, finding work in a wide variety of occupations including as a farm labourer, opal miner, circus hand, potato digger, and shearing shed roustabout. In the late 1930s he returned to Sydney where he worked as a railway porter. During World War II, Niland was rejected for military service due to a heart condition – he worked as a shearer under the Manpower Directorate.

On 11 May 1942 Niland married New Zealand-born journalist and fellow author, Rosina Ruth Park. Eventually the couple had five children: Anne (born ca. June 1943), Rory, Patrick and twin daughters, Kilmeny (1950–2009) and Deborah (1950-present). After their wedding, Niland and Park travelled through the Australian outback – he worked as a shearer and she worked as a cook – before settling in Surry Hills in 1943, then a tough working-class suburb of Sydney.

== Career ==
Together they earned a living writing full-time and garnering critical praise for their works. By January 1944 both Niland and Park had each written radio scripts for Australian Broadcasting Commission's serial, Children's Session, and collaborated on a Christmas play, The Disappointed Dumpling.

Between 1949 and 1952, Niland won many prizes for his short stories and novels and, three years later, achieved international fame with the novel The Shiralee. This was followed by Call Me When the Cross Turns Over (1957) and four more novels. He also wrote radio and television plays, and hundreds of short stories, some of which were collected and published in four volumes from 1961 to 1966.

Of all Niland's books, The Shiralee remains his most renowned. It portrays the wanderings and experiences of an Australian swagman named Macauley and his daughter. It was published in 1955 and made into a 1957 film, starring Peter Finch, and a 1987 TV mini-series, starring Bryan Brown. Niland also compiled a collection of Australian folk songs, releasing them under the title Travelling songs of old Australia (1966).

== Posthumous work and personal life ==
Park edited the pick of her husband's short stories after his death and they were published by Penguin Books in 1987. She also completed his research into the life of Les Darcy, releasing it in the form of a biography, Home Before Dark (1995), that was written with her son-in-law Rafe Champion. The Darcy biography is drawn from Niland's immense archive of books, photographs, clippings, letters, unpublished memoirs and taped interviews about the ill-fated boxer, supplemented by subsequent research. (A hero to many Irish Australians, Darcy had died of an infection in America at the height of his sporting powers, only a few months before Niland's birth in 1917.)

Picking up where Niland left off, Park's biography is a compiled chronicle of Darcy's short life as seen through the eyes of his contemporaries. It also throws light on the Australian national mood during the years of World War I.

Park's autobiographies A Fence around the Cuckoo and Fishing in the Styx include details of her life with Niland and their five children. Their twin daughters, Kilmeny and Deborah, both forged successful careers as book illustrators.

== Death ==
Niland was burdened with a chronic heart condition (it had prevented him from serving with the Australian armed forces during World War II), and he died at the age of 49.

Park died in Sydney in 2010, aged 93. Her obituary appeared in The Sydney Morning Herald newspaper on 17 December of that year.

== Bibliography ==
=== Novels ===
- The Shiralee (1955)
- Call Me When the Cross Turns Over (1957)
- The Big Smoke (1959)
- Gold in the Streets (1959)
- The Apprentices (1965)
- Dead Men Running (1969)

=== Radio Plays ===
- A Place Where You Whisper (1951)
- One Man's Kingdom (1957) with Ruth Park

=== Short story collections ===
- Dadda Jumped Over Two Elephants (1961)
- The Ballad of the Fat Bushranger: and Other Stories (1961)
- Logan's Girl : and Other Stories (1961)
- Pairs and Loners (1966)
- The Penguin Best Stories of D'Arcy Niland (1987)

=== Nonfiction ===
- The Drums Go Bang (1956), collaborative autobiography with Ruth Park

=== TV ===
- Adventure Unlimited
