= The Shiralee (1987 film) =

- DVD cover
- Based on: The Shiralee by D'Arcy Niland
- Written by: Tony Morphett
- Directed by: George Ogilvie
- Starring: Bryan Brown; Rebecca Smart; Noni Hazlehurst
- Music by: Chris Neal
- Country of origin: Australia
- Original language: English

Production
- Producer: Bruce Moir
- Running time: 103 minutes
- Production company: South Australian Film Corporation
- Budget: A$2,750,000

Original release
- Network: Seven Network
- Release: 26 June 1988 – 1988

The Shiralee is a 1987 Australian television film directed by George Ogilvie, based on the 1955 novel of the same name by D'Arcy Niland.

It was originally filmed as a mini-series and was shot in Adelaide and Quorn, South Australia.

== Plot ==
The plot revolves around an itinerant rural worker and fighter — sometimes described as a "swagman" or "swaggie" — named Macauley (Bryan Brown) who unexpectedly finds himself taking responsibility for his child. The film contrasts the harshness of Australian masculinity with a parent-child relationship.

A loner formerly from the city, Macauley finds himself in a small country town where he falls for the local butcher's daughter, Lily (Noni Hazlehurst). Their romance is thwarted, however, by a jealous rival and after a misunderstanding Macauley finds himself back on the road and later working as a boxer in a travelling carnival. During a stopover in the old town, Macauley hopes to meet up again with Lily, only to find her married. Devastated, he turns to a fellow carnival-worker, Marge, and promises to marry her and move to the city, much to the concern of his friends who can see he doesn't love her and that the relationship is set to fail.

Years later, Macauley has left his wife and young daughter to work on the road, sending money home. When Macauley has one of his infrequent visits to Marge, he finds her living with another man, Donny, an SP bookie. He beats Donny up, grabs his five-year-old daughter Buster (Rebecca Smart), and returns to the road. They walk from job to job in rural South Australia, camping beside riverbanks.

While looking for work, finding it difficult with a child in tow, Macauley meets up again with Lily who reveals her husband has died in an accident and her father is gravely ill, leaving her to run their farm. Macauley visits with Lily's dying father, who reveals that Lily was never the same after Macauley left all those years ago. Lily offers Macauley a job and they later share a passionate moment, revealing they still have feelings for each other, but pride pushes them apart.

Buster falls ill, with Lily and Macauley arguing about how to take care of her. When Buster recovers, they take to the road again and Macauley starts to take pride in his daughter's strength and resilience.

Macauley takes Buster to the next town where he is welcomed by old friends Bella and Luke Sweeney. He tries to get the child to stay with the kindly couple, believing they can offer her a better life than he can, but she refuses and Macauley reluctantly accepts they belong together. In Quorn, Marge tracks them down and tries unsuccessfully to take back Buster. Later, Buster is hit by a car. As she battles for her life in hospital, Macauley must dash to Adelaide to oppose his wife's court bid for custody of the child as he admits he wants to keep her. Lily has arrived at the hospital and promises to stay with Buster. He beats the case by threatening to expose his ex's relationship with Donny; Donny forces Marge to choose between him or the child, who it emerges she never had any intention of caring for. She was seeking custody only to spite Macauley and planned to put her in a home.

Macauley returns to the hospital by train, arriving shortly before Buster opens her eyes, and when they see each other the love between the two is evident. The film ends there, but there is an implication that there may finally be a chance for Macauley and Lily.

== Miniseries ==
The 103 minute film was released in Australia as a two episode television miniseries, 188 minutes in length. The miniseries rated 40 points and was the most popular Australian show of 1988.

Both the film and miniseries are available on streaming services.

== Cast ==
Starring

- Bryan Brown as Jim 'Mac' Macauley
- Noni Hazlehurst as Lily Parker
- Rebecca Smart as Buster Macauley
- Lewis Fitz-Gerald as Tony
- Lorna Lesley as Marge Macauley

Featuring

- Madeleine Blackwell as Lucy
- Simon Chilvers as Thaddeus
- Lynette Curran as Hareema
- Reg Evans as Luke Sweeney
- Frank Gallacher as 'Beauty' Kelly
- Julie Hamilton as Bella Sweeney
- Norman Kaye as Desmond
- Ned Manning as Jim
- Ray Meagher as Polkadot
- William Zappa as Donny

== Reception ==
The miniseries won the Best Miniseries accolade at the 1988 Penguin Awards.
