= The Shiralee (1957 film) =

British Australian western by Leslie Norman

- Theatrical release poster
- Directed by: Leslie Norman
- Written by: Leslie Norman; Neil Paterson
- Based on: novel by D'Arcy Niland
- Produced by: Michael Balcon
- Starring: Peter Finch; Dana Wilson; Elizabeth Sellars
- Narrated by: Charles Tingwell
- Cinematography: Paul Beeson
- Edited by: Gordon Stone
- Music by: John Addison
- Production company: Ealing Studios
- Distributed by: Metro-Goldwyn-Mayer
- Release dates: 11 July 1957 (UK); August 1957 (Australia)
- Running time: 99 min.
- Country: United Kingdom
- Language: English
- Budget: $597,000
- Box office: $920,000

The Shiralee is a 1957 British drama film directed by Leslie Norman and starring Peter Finch. It is in the Australian Western genre, based on the 1955 novel by D'Arcy Niland. It was made by Ealing Studios, and although all exterior scenes were filmed in Sydney, Scone and Binnaway, New South Wales and Australian actors Charles Tingwell, Bill Kerr and Ed Devereaux played in supporting roles, the film is really a British film made in Australia, rather than an Australian film.

== Plot ==
An itinerant rural worker named Macauley – sometimes described as a "swagman" or "swaggie" – returns to Sydney from "walkabout" and finds his wife Lily living with another man. He beats up the man and takes his daughter, Buster, with him. Macauley tries to get a job with a previous employer, Parker, but he angrily tells Macauley to go away, saying he had left his daughter Lily pregnant. Macauley tries to leave Buster with some friends of his, but she runs after him and he relents. Macauley narrowly prevents his wife making off with Buster, but after Buster is hit by a car and badly injured, he finds out that his wife is divorcing him and trying to gain legal custody of Buster. He returns to Sydney to fight it, leading to a violent confrontation with his wife's new lover.

The child is the "shiralee", an Irish or Aboriginal word meaning "swag", or metaphorically, a "burden."

== Cast ==
- Peter Finch as Jim Macauley
- Dana Wilson as Buster Macauley
- Elizabeth Sellars as Marge Macauley
- George Rose as Donny
- Rosemary Harris as Lily Parker
- Russell Napier as Mr. W.G. Parker
- Niall MacGinnis as Beauty Kelly
- Tessie O'Shea as Bella Sweeney
- Sid James as Luke Sweeney
- Charles 'Bud' Tingwell as Jim Muldoon
- Reg Lye as Desmond
- Barbara Archer as Shopgirl
- Alec Mango as Papadoulos
- John Phillips as Doctor
- Bruce Beeby as solicitor
- Frank Leighton as barman
- Nigel Lovell as O'Hara
- John Cazabon as Charlie the Butcher
- Mark Daly as Sam
- Ed Devereaux as Christy
- Guy Doleman as Son O'Neill
- Lloyd Berrell
- Bettina Dickson
- Gordon Glenwright
- Fred Goddard
- Clifford Hunter
- Stuart McWhirter as person placing bet on swagmen
- Betty McDowall as Girl at Parkers
- Henry Murdoch
- Frank Raynor
- Lou Vernon
- David Williams
- Chin Yu
- Bill Kerr as a shopkeeper (uncredited)
- Ronald Whelan

== Production ==
=== Development ===
Britain's Ealing Studios had enjoyed a huge critical and commercial success with the film The Overlanders (1946) which was shot in Australia. Leslie Norman was an associate producer on the movie. Ealing's next two films in Australia, Eureka Stockade and Bitter Spring had not been as successful and the studio pulled back on plans to make movies in Australia. However the success of Rank's film version of A Town Like Alice showed there was still a strong potential market for movies set in Australia. There had also been a number of popular British movies with child lead characters.

The novel of The Shiralee was published in 1955. RKO was reportedly interested in buying the screenrights but that fell through. Australian actor Peter Finch was reportedly interested in getting the rights himself. Leslie Norman said he "loved" the novel and sent it to Michael Balcon at Ealing. According to Norman, "Mick roasted me, said it was full of foul language and how dare I? I said that it wouldn't be in the film, so he said all right and to get him a script." Ealing paid a reported £10,000 for the film rights in 1955.

Norman says he wrote a script, showed it to Balcon who "claimed it was a different story, so we called in Neil Patterson to rewrite. He only rewrote one scene but it was enough to appease Mick. I suffered a lot from Mick."

Ealing had been associated with the Rank organisation but in 1956 Ealing signed an agreement with MGM for the latter studio to distribute their films worldwide; The Shiralee was to be the first film they made together. (Others would include Man in the Sky and Dunkirk.)

Ealing at first wanted to cast a Hollywood star in the lead, which devastated Finch. However these plans fell through and in April 1956 it was announced the lead role would be played by Finch. He would be returning to Australia for the first time since 1948 to make the movie. "I am pleased to return for an Australian film of a book by an Australian writer," said Finch.

Leslie Norman arrived in Sydney in April 1956 to begin preproduction. Finch arrived in July and an extensive talent search was conducted to find the actress to play Buster. Eight-year-old Dana Wilson of Croydon, Sydney, was cast.

=== Shooting ===
The film was shot in the last months of 1956, first on location in north east New South Wales near Scone.

Coonabarabran stood in for "Nulla Nulla". Binnaway stood in for "Bungana". Scenes were also shot on the Oxley Highway between Coonabarabran and Gilgandra. A young Bruce Beresford, then a student at Kings School, followed the unit with a friend, Adrian Thirlwood, making their own version of The Shiralee.

In October the unit transferred to MGM's studios in London for five more weeks of shooting. Child stars were not encouraged in British cinema so Dana Wilson's presence was downplayed by the studio during the English leg of production. The cast included several Australian actors working in London such as Frank Leighton and Charles Tingwell.

Tessie O'Shea was a music hall artist who had never appeared in a film before. (Finch had wanted Anna Magnani to play that role.)

Peter Finch later said the film and his role in it were among his favourites in his career. Norman says Finch "was marvellous... it was great working with him. Of course he was not a Balcon sort of character at all – too wild a lifestyle."

== Reception ==
=== Box office ===
According to Kinematograph Weekly the film was "in the money" at the British box office in 1957.

According to another account, the film was the tenth most popular film at the British box office in 1957 and earned $920,000 worldwide ($60,000 at the US and Canadian box office). After costs of production and distribution, the film made a profit of $149,000.

=== Critical reception ===
The Monthly Film Bulletin wrote:

The success of The Shiralee is due largely to the clear, sharp light it throws both on the Australian scene and its two principal characters. Paul Beeson's finely photographed exteriors reveal a rough, bare landscape and the quick tensions of the people are depicted in a similarly unromanticised manner. Although excessive sentimentality is avoided, there is nothing austere in the handling of the human relationships: the tone is consistently warm and affectionate. Thanks to sympathetic direction and the lively, uninhibited playing of Peter Finch as the swagman and Dana Wilson as his Shiralee (an Aborigine expression meaning 'burden'), the contrast between Macauley's proud and fiercely independent spirit and the child's simple devotion (which crystallizes into an unspoken understanding and love) is touchingly observed. Unfortunately, few of the subsidiary characters emerge with equal force or clarity; the playing includes some broad, but not unlikeable, comedy from Tessie O'Shea and Sidney James and there are two rather tensely contrived performances by Elizabeth Sellars and Rosemary Harris. The episodic nature of the story is also most noticeable during the second half, the encounter with the homespun Plillosopher and the quarrels over the divorce lacking the spontaneity and drive of the earlier scenes. But its firmly rounded central portraits and the comparatively unfamiliar settings successfully sustain the interest throughout.

== Music ==
The song "Shiralee" used as soundtrack was sung by Tommy Steele and reached #11 on the United Kingdom Singles Chart in 1957.
