= Jacquotte Delahaye =

Legendary female pirate

Jacquotte Delahaye (fl. 1656) was a purported pirate of legend in the Caribbean Sea. She has been depicted as operating alongside Anne Dieu-le-Veut as one of very few 17th-century female pirates. There is no evidence from period sources that Delahaye was a real person. Stories of her exploits are attributed to oral storytelling and Leon Treich, a French fiction writer of the 1940s.

== Biography ==
Delahaye reportedly came from Saint-Domingue in modern Haiti, and was the daughter of a French father and a Haitian mother, who spoke French. Her mother is said to have died while giving birth to her brother, who suffered a mild mental disability, and was left in her care after her father's death. According to legend and tradition, she became a pirate after the murder of her father.

Jacquotte was a war hero who faked her own death to escape her pursuers. She adopted a male alias as her nom de guerre and lived as a man for many years. Upon her return, she became known as "Back From the Dead Red" because of her striking red hair.

She led a gang of hundreds of pirates, and with their help took over Tortuga, a small Caribbean island off the northwest coast of Hispaniola, in 1656, which was called a "freebooter republic". Several years later, she died in a shoot-out while defending it.

== Historicity ==
Primary sources which mention her, her work and happenings, or her life are unknown, nor are there any first-hand accounts. Laura Sook Duncombe wrote: "If Anne de Graaf has only a small chance of having really lived, Jacquotte Delahaye has an even smaller one." The Spanish author Germán Vázquez Chamorro wrote in Mujeres Piratas ('Pirate Women') that she did not exist, but was a literary creation "...added into the lore of the buccaneer period to make the ruthless men more palatable to the modern reader." (Note: "The women who are often discussed in pirate histories – including Queen Teuta of Illyria, Anne Bonny, Mary Read, Cheng I Sao, and Grace O'Malley – are found in this collection. So are names that rarely see the light of day, such as Sayyida al-Hurra, Maria Cobham, Lai Choi, and Rachel Wall. Duncombe even mentions the suggestion that Bartholomew Roberts might have been a woman in disguise. Rather than use footnotes or end notes, she seamlessly weaves this information into her narrative, removing the need to search for this elsewhere and thus break its flow. Pirate Women also includes fictional pirates, such as Anne de Graaf, Jacquotte Delahaye, and Gunpowder Gertie." Indeed, she has been listed in the top ten of female pirates, even as her existence is questioned.) Stories of her exploits are attributed to oral storytelling and Leon Treich, a French fiction writer of the 1940s. (Note: "With her unbeatable combination of beauty and bravery, Jacquotte Delahaye inspired countless tales over the years. Some even maintain that she herself was a work of fiction. Certainly, unlike many pirates, there is no real historical evidence confirming her existence. But where's the fun in that?" As Little observes: "... purported facts about these "pirate women" have been carved from thin air. Jacquotte Delahaye, for example, is said to have been a biracial female filibuster." Jaeger is equally dismissive: "C'est dans cette circonstance, raconte Léon Treich, que Jacquotte Delahaye fut tuée, près de la Pointe - au - Maçon, comme elle chassait le taureau . Elle avait deux engagés avec elle deux seulement [ ... ] Ils l'invitèrent à se")

As Benerson Little summarizes:

Jacquotte Delahaye, for example, is said to have been a biracial female filibuster. (Note: According to the OED, filibuster n. 1 prolonged speaking or other action which obstructs progress in a legislative assembly while not technically contravening the required procedures. 2 (historical) a person engaging in unauthorized warfare against a foreign state. v. [often as noun, 'filibustering'] obstruct legislation with a filibuster. ORIGIN 18th century: from the French: flibustier, first applied to pirates who pillaged the Spanish colonies in the West Indies, influenced by Spanish: filibustero, denoting American adventurers who incited revolution in Latin America; ultimately from Dutch: vrijbuiter, 'freebooter', who cruised from Tortuga off the north coast of Saint-Domingue (modern day Haiti) during the 1650s." "filibuster". Oxford English Dictionary (online ed.). Oxford University Press. (Subscription or participating institution membership required.)) An entire, if brief, biography has been written of her and repeated without question in books and online. She commanded a ship with a crew of a hundred men; she rejected a marriage proposal from filibuster Michel d'Artigue, known as 'le Basque'; and she led the attack on Fort de la Roche on Tortuga and recaptured it from the Spanish. But there is no evidence that she existed.

== In popular culture ==
Delahaye's story is the lead subject of Back From the Dead Red, a small independently produced animated film written by Joanna Benecke.

In the period romantic comedy television series Our Flag Means Death, Leslie Jones appeared as the pirate "Spanish Jackie", who some think was based on Delahaye.

The life of Delahaye is the basis of the historical fiction books The Ballad of Jacquotte Delahaye by Briony Cameron and Fire Sword and Sea by Vanessa Riley.

== See also ==
- Charlotte de Berry
- Filibuster
- Privateer
