= John Vidal =

Colonial American pirate

John Vidal (fl. 1727) was a minor pirate in the Thirteen Colonies of Irish descent briefly active near Ocracoke Inlet off North Carolina. He is best known for bringing the Farley family with him, causing wife Martha Farley to be one of the few women tried for piracy.

== Biography ==
In May 1727 John Vidal raided a wreck and a few small ships, including the schooner Anne and Francis, near Ocracoke Inlet in a small piragua. With him were Thomas Farley, his wife Martha Farley, their two children, and two other pirates, Edward Coleman and Thomas Allen. The Farleys had been convicts, transported separately to the Province of North Carolina in 1725.

Vidal was in a rowboat with three prisoners he had taken when they overpowered him and delivered him to local authorities. Thomas Farley escaped and his ultimate fate is unknown. Coleman and Allen were captured while ashore after local residents informed on them.

North Carolina had no Admiralty Court to try pirates, but Governor Richard Everard agreed to transfer Vidal to Williamsburg, Virginia to try him before a Vice-Admiralty Court. A trial commenced on August 15, 1727. Vidal's other two accomplices were found guilty and hanged, and Vidal was scheduled for execution.

Virginia Governor Robert Carter granted Vidal a temporary reprieve. He wrote of Vidal to Everard, "I must own to you I have very little Compassion for persons Convicted of his Crime … It appeard very plainly to me from the Testimony against him as well as the rest that his heart was fully prepared for perpetrating the blackest of Vilianys, Altho the designe was laid with the greatest Improbability of Success."

Martha Farley (sometimes referred to as Mary Farlee or Mary Harvey) pleaded that she had no idea her husband Thomas meant to engage in piracy and thought he was returning them to friends they had left behind in the Province of South Carolina. The Court believed her, and not wanting to orphan her children, acquitted her.

Newly arrived North Carolina Lieutenant Governor William Gooch wrote to England on Vidal's behalf after his advisors suggested a grant of clemency would be a good way to begin his tenure. The stay of execution was granted and in September 1727 Vidal was pardoned.

== See also ==
- Anne Bonny, Mary Read, and Mary Critchett, the other confirmed women active in the Golden Age of Piracy.
- Women in piracy
- Grace O'Malley
- Zheng Yi Sao
- Rachel Wall
- Mary Wolverston
