= True Caribbean Pirates =

- Directed by: Tim Prokop
- Starring: Lance Holt; Patrick Landers; Nino Firetto Armorer Gary Harper
- Theme music composer: Michael Richard Plowman
- Country of origin: United States

Production
- Producer: Tim Prokop
- Running time: 120 minutes with commercials

Original release
- Network: History Channel
- Release: 2006

True Caribbean Pirates is a documentary that aired on the History Channel in 2006.

The documentary tells about pirates of the Caribbean such as Blackbeard, Henry Morgan, Anne Bonny and Bartholomew Roberts. Larger than life, more dangerous than legend - pirates and buccaneers set sail for plunder. True Caribbean Pirates recreates the rise of piracy in the Caribbean and its climactic, inevitable downfall.

== Show history ==
True Caribbean Pirates captures the events and tales of piracy that were said to take place in the Caribbean during the time when Christopher Columbus made his landing in the West Indies during 1492. Within this time, the land of the Caribbean had attracted the attention of many but was dominated by Spain; as they mined plenty of riches and gold out of the region. This drew attention to the land and disruptions arose- creating chaos in the new world. Regions such as the Netherlands, England and France all began to send privateers into the land so they could, too, establish a presence.

== Characters ==
In the days of pirates and treasures, privateering was used to fight battles and disrupt the Spanish without having to pay for real navy within the Caribbean. Privateers were known to disrupt commerce and take part in the disruption of the enemies warships to protect trade against raiders.

Sir Henry Morgan- played by Lance J. Holt- was one of the most famous privateers to cross the Caribbean land was known for his ruthless acts against his ways to bring down them down through his brutal acts. The privateer turned pirate was most notorious for his two most famous attacks on Porto Bello and Panama. Porto Bello was targeted by Morgan due to it being the third most relevant Spanish city in regards to its saturation of warehouses that stored the riches discovered by Spanish colonies. Morgan and his men then went to capture Panama where they were much more capable of destruction compared to the opposing Spanish attackers. Sir Henry Morgan died unlike many other pirates- dying from what may have been tuberculosis and was buried at Palisadoes cemetery.

Blackbeard- played by Patrick Lander- earned his stripes by attacking Spanish ships during the Spanish Succession and to withhold the stolen goods which transformed him into an experienced sea robber, allowing him to join a group of Caribbean Pirates. Many stories have been retold time and time again about Blackbeard’s capturing ships with hostages and bribing them with their lives in turn for favors to benefit his conquests.

The fearful pirate in 1718, eventually took an offer of a pardon by the Governor of South Carolina and retired to the isle of Ocracoke an outer island off the coast of North Carolina. He indulged in a bit of smuggling but was ultimately lured to his death in 1719 by 2 British Navy Ships.

Lieutenant Robert Maynard set a trap for the supposedly reformed pirate by having both ships anchored off shore in rough seas, making the 2 seemingly distressed boats appear almost empty by pretending most of the crew had died. Blackbeard fell for it and saw only an easy target and not a trap, taking only a few men with him on board.

He swaggered on board and was ambushed, refusing to go down easily. According to the logs of Lieutenant Maynard and his commanding officer Captain Gordon, Blackbeard took over 24 cuts from the sword after seemingly fighting for hours. Both men were impressed with his bravery and resilience but in the end it did Blackbeard no favor.

After eventually killing him during the vigorous battle, Lieutenant Maynard then decapitated the infamous pirate and strung his head up the mast.

John Rackham- played by David Joseph Boyd- was a pirate who conducted his operations in the Bahamas and Cuba. Rackham was not as successful in his missions as the previous two pirates mentioned and was mostly known for his relations with the two female pirates Anne Bonny (played by Michelle Michaels) and Mary Read (played by Kimberly Adair), who served under his command. He was captured in October 1720 after a short battle and imprisoned alongside his crew in Jamaica. Rackham is tried, found guilty of piracy, and hanged on November 18, 1720.

Bartholomew Roberts- played by Scott Silbor- was a Welsh pirate who raided ships off the Americas and West Africa between 1719 and 1722. He was the most successful pirate of the Golden Age of Piracy (as measured by vessels captured), taking over 400 prizes in his career. He was originally the third mate on the slave ship Princess when it was captured by pirates off West Africa in 1719, and Roberts and several other of the crew of the Princess were forced to join the pirate crew. After the captain was killed in an ambush on the island of Principe, Roberts was elected as the new captain. After avenging the previous captain by ransacking Principe, he sailed for Brazil in 1719 and later to the Caribbean. After sailing back to the African coast, he was finally killed in action off Cape Lopez in 1722.

The stories of these pirates have been retold in this documentary as it separates the truth from the tales; truly depicting the true story of Piracy's Golden Age.
