= Golden Age of Piracy =

Maritime piracy from the 1650s to the 1730s

- 1650s–1730s
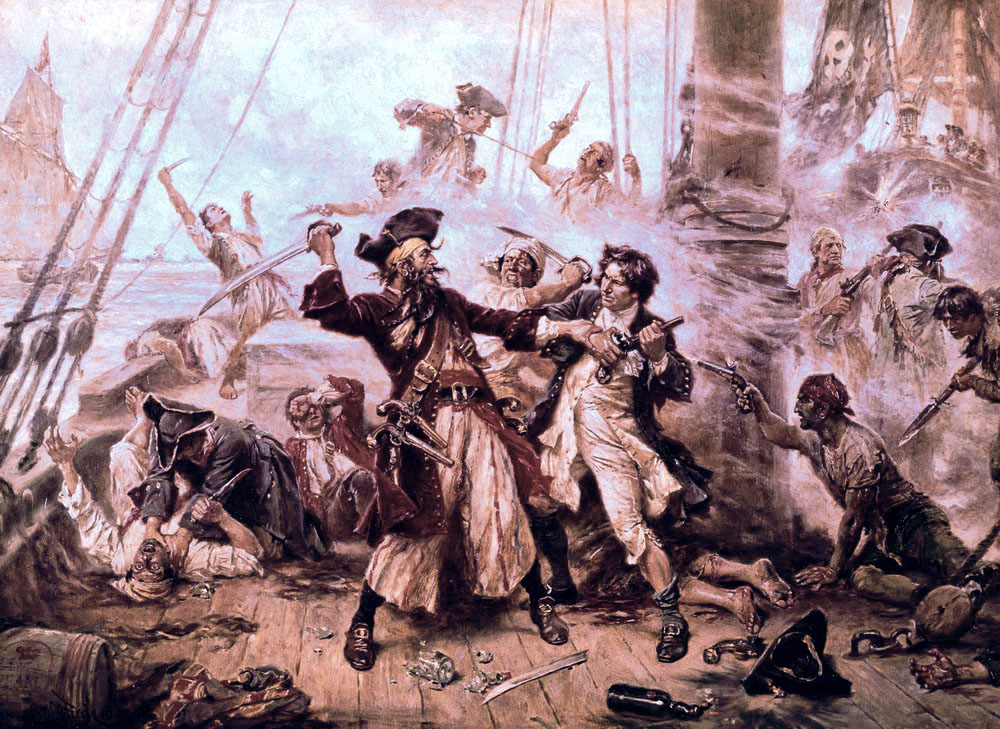
- 1920 painting of Blackbeard's final battle against Robert Maynard in 1718
- Location: North Atlantic; Indian Ocean; Pacific Ocean

The Golden Age of Piracy was the period between the 1650s and the 1730s, when maritime piracy was a significant factor in the histories of the North Atlantic and Indian Oceans.

Histories of piracy often subdivide the Golden Age of Piracy into three periods:

1. The buccaneering period (approximately 1650 to 1680), characterized by Anglo-French seamen based in Jamaica, Martinique, and Tortuga attacking Spanish colonies, and shipping in the Caribbean and eastern Pacific to western Pacific.
2. The Pirate Round (1690s), associated with long-distance voyages from various Caribbean and North American ports to established bases in countries like Madagascar, in order to rob Muslim and East India Company targets in the Indian Ocean and Red Sea.
3. The post-Spanish Succession period (1715 to 1730), when English sailors and privateers left unemployed by the end of the War of the Spanish Succession turned en masse to piracy in the Caribbean, the Indian Ocean, the North American eastern seaboard, and the West African coast.

Narrower definitions of the Golden Age sometimes exclude the first or second periods, but most include at least some portion of the third. The modern conception of pirates as depicted in popular culture is derived largely, although not always accurately, from the Golden Age of Piracy.

Factors contributing to piracy during the Golden Age included the rise in quantities of valuable cargoes being shipped to Europe over vast ocean areas, reduced European navies in certain regions, the training and experience that many sailors had gained in European navies (particularly the British Royal Navy), and corrupt and ineffective government in European overseas colonies. Colonial powers at the time constantly fought with pirates and engaged in several notable battles and other related events.

== Name of the Golden Age ==
=== Origin ===
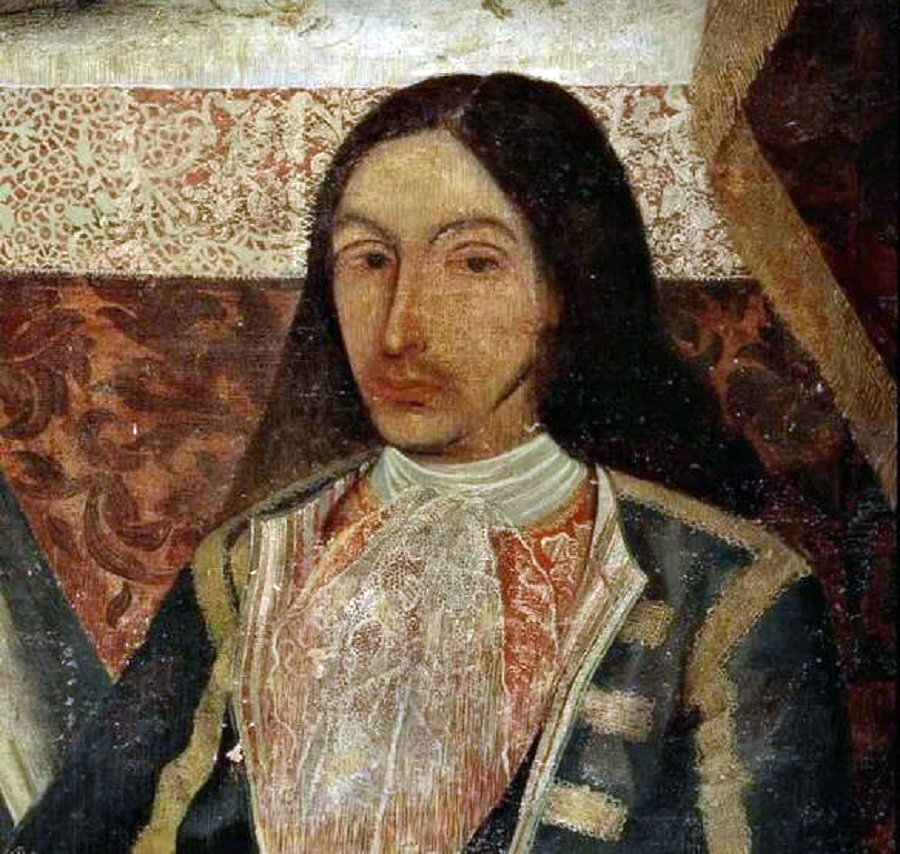
Amaro Pargo, a Spaniard who was one of the most famous corsairs of the Golden Age of Piracy

The oldest known literary mention of a "Golden Age" of piracy is from 1894, when the English journalist George Powell wrote about "What appears to have been the golden age of piracy up to the last decade of the 17th century." Powell uses the phrase while reviewing Charles Leslie's A New and Exact History of Jamaica, then over 150 years old. Powell uses the phrase only once.

In 1897, a more systematic use of the phrase "Golden Age of Piracy" was introduced by historian John Fiske, who wrote, "At no other time in the world's history has the business of piracy thriven so greatly as in the seventeenth century and the first part of the eighteenth. Its golden age may be said to have extended from about 1650 to about 1720." Fiske included the activities of the Barbary corsairs and East Asian pirates in this "Golden Age," noting that "as these Mussulman pirates and those of Eastern Asia were as busily at work in the seventeenth century as at any other time, their case does not impair my statement that the age of the buccaneers was the Golden Age of piracy."

Pirate historians of the first half of the 20th century occasionally adopted Fiske's term "Golden Age," without necessarily following his beginning and ending dates for it. The most expansive definition of an age of piracy was that of Patrick Pringle, who wrote in 1951 that "the most flourishing era in the history of piracy ... began in the reign of Queen Elizabeth I and ended in the second decade of the eighteenth century." This idea starkly contradicted Fiske, who had hotly denied that such Elizabethan figures as Francis Drake were pirates.

=== Trend toward narrow definitions ===
Of recent definitions, that given by Pringle appears to have the widest range, an exception to an overall trend among historians from 1909 until the 1990s, toward narrowing the Golden Age. As early as 1924, Philip Gosse described piracy as being at its height "from 1680 until 1730." In his highly popular 1978 book The Pirates for TimeLife's The Seafarers series, Douglas Botting defined the Golden Age as lasting "barely 30 years, starting at the close of the 17th Century and ending in the first quarter of the 18th." Botting's definition was closely followed by Frank Sherry in 1986. In a 1989 academic article, Professor Marcus Rediker defined the Golden Age as lasting only from 1716 to 1726. Angus Konstam in 1998, reckoned the era as lasting from 1700 until 1730.

Perhaps the ultimate step in restricting the Golden Age was in Konstam's 2005 The History of Pirates, in which he retreated from his own earlier definition, called a 1690–1730 definition of the Golden Age "generous," and concluded that "The worst of these pirate excesses was limited to an eight-year period, from 1714 until 1722, so the true Golden Age cannot even be called a 'golden decade.'"

=== Recent countertrend toward broader meaning ===
David Cordingly, in his influential 1994 work Under the Black Flag, defined the "great age of piracy" as lasting from the 1650s to around 1725, very close to Fiske's definition of the Golden Age.

Rediker, in 2004, described the most complex definition of the Golden Age to date. He proposes a "golden age of piracy, which spanned the period from roughly 1650 to 1730," which he subdivides into three distinct "generations": the buccaneers of 1650–1680, the Indian Ocean pirates of the 1690s, and the pirates of the years 1716–1726.

== History ==
Piracy arose out of, and mirrored on a smaller scale, conflicts over trade and colonization among the rival European powers of the time, including the empires of Britain, Spain, the Netherlands, Portugal, and France. Most pirates in this era were of English, Welsh, Dutch, Irish, and French origin. Many pirates came from poorer urban areas, such as the ports of London, in search of a way to make money and of reprieve. Piracy, therefore, offered power and quick riches.

=== Buccaneering period, c. 1650–1680 ===
Historians such as John Fiske mark the beginning of the Golden Age of Piracy at around 1650, when the end of the Wars of Religion allowed European countries to resume the development of their colonial empires. This involved considerable seaborne trade and a general economic improvement: there was money to be made – or stolen – and much of it traveled by ship.

French buccaneers had established themselves on northern Hispaniola as early as 1625, but lived at first mostly as hunters of pigs and cattle rather than robbers; their transition to full-time piracy was gradual and motivated in part by Spanish efforts to wipe out both the buccaneers and the prey animals on which they depended. The buccaneers' migration from Hispaniola's mainland to the more defensible offshore island of Tortuga limited their resources and accelerated their piratical raids. According to Alexandre Exquemelin, a buccaneer and historian from this period, the Tortuga buccaneer Pierre Le Grand pioneered the settlers' attacks on galleons making the return voyage to Spain. The French buccaneer François l'Olonnais (Jean-David Nau) was known for his extreme infamous cruelty towards Spanish prisoners on the island of Martinica, which served as a home port for French buccaneers like him, allowing the French to operate in the Caribbean against Spanish ships.

The growth of buccaneering on Tortuga was augmented by the English capture of Jamaica from Spain in 1655. The early English governors of Jamaica freely granted letters of marque to Tortuga buccaneers and to their own countrymen, while the growth of Port Royal provided these raiders with a far more profitable and enjoyable place to sell their booty. In the 1660s, the new French governor of Tortuga, Bertrand d'Ogeron, similarly provided privateering commissions both to his own colonists and to English cutthroats from Port Royal. These conditions brought Caribbean buccaneering to its zenith, culminating in Henry Morgan's Panama expedition in 1670 which saw Panama City plundered, sacked, and burned the following year.

The devastations brought by buccaneers finally drove the Spanish crown to authorize privateering, which they had traditionally allowed only in very limited ways, in order to hunt down piracy and contraband. This led to the emergence of the guarda costa, who would become especially relevant the following century.

=== Pirate Round, c. 1693–1700 ===
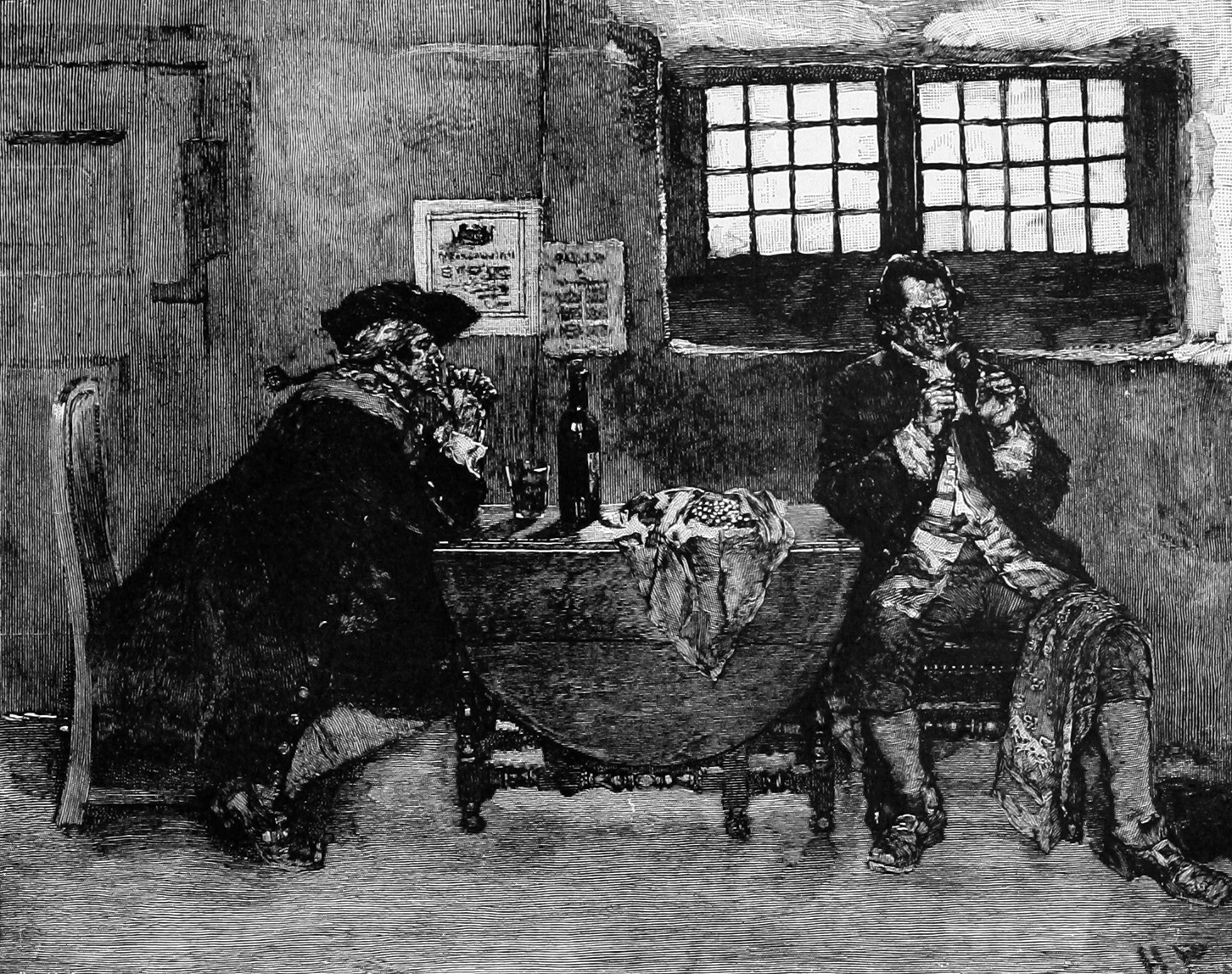
Henry Every is shown selling his loot in this engraving by Howard Pyle. Every's capture of the Grand Mughal ship Ganj-i-Sawai in 1695 stands as one of the most profitable pirate raids ever perpetrated.

A number of factors caused English pirates, some of whom had been introduced to piracy during the buccaneering period, to look beyond the Caribbean for treasure as the 1690s began. The Glorious Revolution had restored the traditional enmity between Britain and France, thus ending the profitable collaboration between English Jamaica and French Tortuga. The devastation of Port Royal by an earthquake in 1692 further reduced the Caribbean's attractions by destroying the pirates' chief market for fenced plunder. Caribbean colonial governors began to discard the traditional policy of "no peace beyond the Line," under which it was understood that war would continue (and thus letters of marque would be granted) in the Caribbean regardless of peace treaties signed in Europe; henceforth, commissions would be granted only in wartime, and their limitations would be strictly enforced. Furthermore, much of the Spanish Main had simply been exhausted; Maracaibo alone had been sacked thrice between 1667 and 1678, while Río de la Hacha had been raided five times and Tolú eight.

At the same time, England's less-favored colonies, including Bermuda, New York, and Rhode Island, had become cash-starved by the Navigation Acts. Merchants and governors eager for coin were willing to overlook and even underwrite pirate voyages; one colonial official defended a pirate because he thought it "very harsh to hang people that brings in gold to these provinces." Although some of these pirates operating out of New England and the Middle Colonies targeted Spain's more remote Pacific coast colonies well into the 1690s and beyond, the Indian Ocean was a richer and more tempting target. India's economic output dwarfed Europe's during this time, especially in high-value luxury goods such as silk and calico, which made ideal pirate booty; at the same time, no powerful navies plied the Indian Ocean, leaving both local shipping and the various East India companies' vessels vulnerable to attack. This set the stage for the famous piracies of Thomas Tew, Henry Every, Robert Culliford, and (although his guilt remains controversial) William Kidd.

=== Post–Spanish Succession period, c. 1715–1730 ===
In 1713 and 1714, a series of peace treaties ended the War of the Spanish Succession. As a result, thousands of seamen, including European privateers who had operated in the West Indies, were relieved of military duty, at a time when cross-Atlantic colonial shipping trade was beginning to boom. In addition, European sailors who had been pushed by unemployment to work onboard merchantmen (including slave ships) were often enthusiastic to abandon that profession and turn to pirating, giving pirate captains a steady pool of recruits on various coasts across the Atlantic Ocean.

In 1715, pirates launched a major raid on Spanish divers trying to recover gold from the sunken treasure galleon Urca de Lima near Florida. The nucleus of the pirate force was a group of English ex-privateers, all of whom were soon to be enshrined in infamy: Henry Jennings, Charles Vane, Samuel Bellamy of Whydah Gally fame, Benjamin Hornigold, and Edward England. The attack was successful, but contrary to their expectations, the governor of Jamaica refused to allow Jennings and his cohorts to spend their loot on his island. With Kingston and the declining Port Royal closed to them, Hornigold, Jennings, and their comrades based themselves at Nassau, on the island of New Providence in the Bahamas. Nassau was home for these pirates and their many recruits until the arrival of Governor Woodes Rogers in 1718, which signalled the end of the Republic of Pirates. Rogers and other British governors had the authority to pardon pirates under the King's Act of Grace: while Hornigold accepted this pardon to become a privateer, others such as Blackbeard returned to piracy following their pardon.

Transatlantic shipping traffic between Africa, the Caribbean, and Europe began to soar in the 18th century, a model known as the triangular trade, and became a rich target for piracy. Trade ships sailed from Europe to the African coast, trading manufactured goods and weapons for slaves. The traders then sailed to the Caribbean to sell the slaves, and return to Europe with goods such as sugar, tobacco, and cocoa. In another triangular trade route, ships carried raw materials, preserved cod, and rum to Europe, where a portion of the cargo was sold for manufactured goods, which (along with the remainder of the original load) were then transported to the Caribbean, where they were exchanged for sugar and molasses, which (with some manufactured articles) were then borne to New England. Ships in the Triangular Trade often made money at each stop.

As part of the settlement of the War of the Spanish Succession, the British South Sea Company obtained the asiento, a Spanish government contract to supply slaves to Spain's New World colonies, which provided British traders and smugglers more access to formerly closed Spanish markets in America. This arrangement also contributed heavily to the spread of piracy across the western Atlantic. Shipping to the colonies boomed along with the flood of skilled mariners after the war. Merchant shippers used the surplus of labor to drive wages down, cut corners to maximize profits, and create unsavory conditions aboard their vessels. Merchant sailors suffered from mortality rates as high or higher than the slaves being transported. Living conditions were so poor that many sailors began to prefer a freer existence as pirates. The increased volume of shipping traffic also could sustain a large body of brigands preying upon it.

During this time, many of the pirates had originally been either sailors for the Royal Navy, privateersmen, or merchant seamen. Most pirates had experience living on the sea, and knew how harsh the conditions could be. Sailors for the king often had very little to eat while out on the sea, and ended up sick, starving, and dying. That resulted in some sailors deserting the king and becoming pirates instead. Compared to merchant vessels, crewmembers on pirate ships often had as much power as the captain outside of battle. The captain only had full authority in times of battle and could be removed from this position if he showed cowardice in the face of the enemy. He was also to be bold in battle, and pirates did not want things to end up the same way as on a navy ship.

==== Return of the Pirate Round ====
The loss of Nassau and harsher policing of Caribbean waters forced many pirates who were veterans of the Wars of Spanish Succession to travel back to Africa and re-establish the pirate round, between the years 1719 and 1730. Among these pirates, many of whom were experienced Caribbean pirates and members of the Republic of Pirates, included Edward England, John Taylor, Olivier Levasseur, and Christopher Condent; all operating from Madagascar.

Taylor and Levasseur reaped the greatest prize in the history of the Golden Age of Piracy, the plunder of the Portuguese East Indiaman Nossa Senhora Do Cabo at Réunion in 1721, stealing diamonds and other treasures worth a total of £800,000. Condent was also a successful pirate, but England was not. He was marooned on Comoros by Taylor and Levasseur in 1721, and died not long afterward. Despite the success of Taylor and Levasseur, the Pirate Round quickly declined again. Levasseur himself, unlike his contemporaries, was captured and hanged on July 7, 1730, before he could retire with his riches.

== Types of pirates ==
=== English privateers ===
Most privateers in the West Indies had English origins; a tradition that began with the reign of Queen Elizabeth I. Privateers were private persons who engaged in maritime warfare under a commission of war, known as letters of marque, which gave them the authority to raid enemy ships and exemption from piracy charges. Many of them turned to piracy due to unemployment or after their letter had been redacted. They became one of the most active pirates during the Golden Age of Piracy, helping create the articles of agreement and the Republic of Pirates. Other privateers, such as Woodes Rogers, Benjamin Hornigold, and Jonathan Barnet, took acts of grace and became so-called "pirate hunters"; using their knowledge and experience to hunt down fellow pirates.

=== French Buccaneers ===
Buccaneers were originally French hunters and traders who mainly operated in the Caribbean, specifically Tortuga. They were named after the wooden framework they used for their meat, called a "buccan". When the Spanish began a crackdown on their livelihood, many resorted to privateering and piracy. They later gained a sizeable English and Dutch population, and were employed by powerful British privateers such as Henry Morgan. These alliances led to the creation of the Brethren of the Coast. Owing to their background as hunters and frontiersmen, buccaneers became known for their marksmanship, skirmishing and raiding; skills sought after by colonial powers.

=== Spanish Guardacosta ===
As a response to maritime attacks on Spanish colonies and trade, Spain created a coast guard unit focused on hunting pirates and smugglers, known as guarda costa. They were born from naval reforms formulated by the Borbóns and Admiral Blas de Lezo that sought to create an alliance between privateers and the Spanish Navy. Utilizing fast-moving lightweight piragua, crewed by a mixture of Spanish and local natives, the guardacosta proved effective in combating piracy throughout Spain's territories in the West Indies, though were criticized for their brutality and indiscrimination. They also often participated in non-government sanctioned piracy and smuggling. By the 1720s, their actions spread to mainland America, specifically Florida.

=== Female pirates ===
The Golden Age produced over 40 female pirates. The most notorious Western female pirates included Anne Bonny and Mary Read, both of whom became acquainted and earned membership in John Rackham's crew. They were finally captured on October 22, 1720, but their death sentences were stalled by claiming to be pregnant. Read died in jail months later, and Bonny disappeared with no record of her execution nor childbirth. In December 1733, the burial of a woman in Jamaica named Ann Bonny was noted. Other examples of female pirates included Mary Critchett, a former prisoner-turned-pirate, who was hanged in 1729.

== Infamous pirates ==
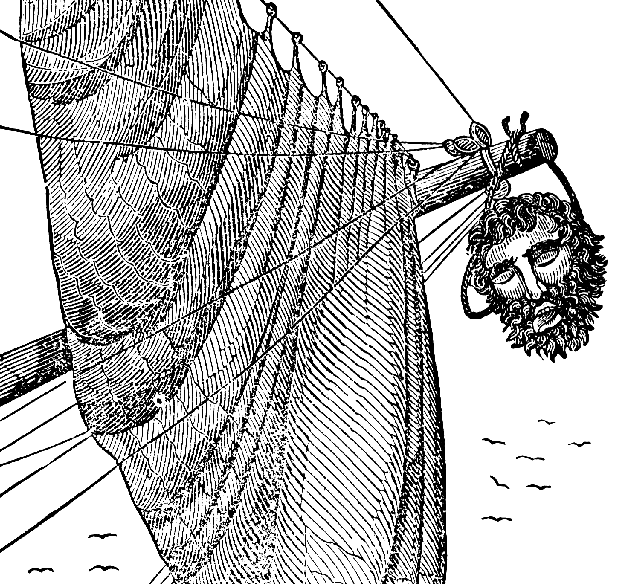
Blackbeard's severed head hanging from Maynard's bowsprit

Many of the best-known pirates in historical lore originate from this Golden Age of Piracy:

- Samuel Bellamy, captain of the Whydah Gally, was lost in a storm off Cape Cod in 1717. Bellamy was popularly known as the "Robin Hood of pirates" and prided himself on his ideological justifications for piracy.
- Stede Bonnet, a rich Barbadian land owner turned pirate solely in search of adventure. Bonnet captained a 10-gun sloop named the Revenge and raided ships off the Virginian coast in 1717. He was caught and hanged in 1718.
- Henry Every, one of the few major pirate captains to retire with his loot without being arrested nor killed in battle. He is famous for capturing the fabulously wealthy Mogul ship Ganj-i-Sawai in 1695.
- Olivier Levasseur, aka La Buse, the only major French pirate in Nassau who was often associated with Hornigold, Bellamy, Kennedy, and Taylor.
- William Fly, whose execution in 1726 is used by historian Marcus Rediker to mark the end of the Golden Age of Pirates.
- William "Captain" Kidd, executed for piracy at Execution Dock, London, in 1701, is famous for the "buried treasure" he supposedly left behind.
- Edward Low, born in Westminster, was active 1721–1724, was never captured, and was notorious for torturing his victims before killing them; he cut off ears, lips, and noses.
- Henry Morgan, a buccaneer who raided the Spaniards and took Panama City before burning it to the ground. He was to be executed in England, but was instead knighted and made governor of Jamaica. He died a natural death in 1688.
- John Rackham, famous for his partnership with female pirates Anne Bonny and Mary Read, was captured, then hanged and gibbeted outside Port Royal, Jamaica, in 1720.
- Bartholomew Roberts, is considered by many to be the most successful Western pirate of all time with over 400 ship captures.
- Edward "Blackbeard" Teach (Thatch), active from 1716 to 1718, is perhaps the most notorious pirate among English-speaking nations. Blackbeard's most famous ship was the Queen Anne's Revenge, named in response to the end of Queen Anne's War. He was killed by one of Lieutenant Robert Maynard's crewmen in 1718.
- Charles Vane, a particularly violent and unrepentant pirate, who served under Henry Jennings before striking out on his own. Harsh and unpopular with his crew, Vane was marooned before being captured and hanged in 1721.
- Benjamin Hornigold, an English pirate who helped found the Republic of Pirates before taking a royal pardon and becoming a pirate hunter
- Amaro Pargo, a prominent Spanish corsair who dominated the route between Cádiz and the Caribbean. His figure has been wrapped in a halo of romanticism and legend that have linked him to piracy, hidden treasures, and illicit romances. In the marble headstone of his tomb in San Cristóbal de La Laguna a skull with two crossbones is engraved that is winking its right eye.

== Warfare ==
The pirate code of the Golden Age pirates had rules that specifically mentioned weaponry. One of these stated that every pirate was responsible for cleaning and maintaining his arms; failure to do so was a punishable offense. There were also rules in regards to fighting, especially when aboard ships. When duels occurred, they were mostly done to settle disputes and fill vacancies in leadership, though they seldom result in death. Honing their craft was essential to pirates. To hone their marksmanship, buccaneers practiced by shooting a doubloon in the air with a musket. Other pirates, when at sea and not actively searching for prey, exercised their skill in the use of cannons. Many pirates were also veterans of various European wars. Buccaneer William Dampier was a former Royal Navy sailor during the Anglo-Dutch War, while a companion named Swan was a soldier who fought during Cromwellian conquest of Ireland.

In naval engagements, pirates used a variety of tactics. The most commonly used was intimidation; once a victim was spotted, the raising of pirate flags and a broadside salvo were used to signify the pirate's intention. Many pirates also donned specific looks to appear more menacing. For example, pirate Sam Bellamy ordered his men to strip naked before an attack on a French ship; the sight was enough to force the French sailors to surrender. Fast and stealthy raids were also frequently done, often with the use of smaller boats and enemy flags. Captain Josiah Burgess became famous for capturing three Royal Navy warships at the same time. One night, while the navymen of the Winchelsea, Tryall, and Swift, disembarked to get fresh water, Burgess and his pirates used canoes to surprise the idle ships. The same lightning fast attack was used during Henry Jennings's legendary raid on the 1715 Treasure Fleet salvage camp.

When pirates faced resistance, or forced to engage in battle, they fought by approaching the bow, and firing chain shots at the vessel's mast, disabling and immobilizing the target in the water. They also used swivel guns to fire deadly "angrage" (basically a mix of nails, bolts, and musket balls) at resisting enemies on the deck. Other unique methods were also recorded. Joseph Bannister was famous for defeating two warships by going to shore, and placing cannons in areas overlooking the water, to effectively bombard the enemy vessels. A naval blockade was once pulled off by Blackbeard in Charleston, South Carolina. Additionally, pirates like Henry Morgan and Charles Vane became known for using fire ships in engagements.

== Decline ==
The events of the latter half of 1718 (including the arrival of Governor Woodes Rogers in Nassau) represented a turning point in the history of piracy in the Western Hemisphere. Without a safe base and with growing pressure from naval forces, the rovers lost their momentum. The lure of the Spanish treasures had faded, and the hunters gradually became the hunted.

By early 1719, the remaining pirates were on the run. Most of them headed for West Africa, seizing poorly defended slavers. The deaths of three of the most successful pirates of the era, Bartholomew Roberts in 1722, William Fly in 1726, and Olivier Levasseur in 1730, are considered by historians to mark the end of the Golden Age, both in the Caribbean and Red Sea, respectively.

== Effect on popular culture ==
Stories and histories from the Golden Age form the foundation of many modern depictions of pirates and piracy. A General History of the Pirates (1724) by Captain Charles Johnson is the source of many biographies of well-known pirates, providing an extensive account of the period although its accuracy has been called into question. Johnson gives an almost mythical status to the more colorful characters such as Blackbeard or John Rackham. In 2002, English naval historian David Cordingly wrote an introduction to Johnson's 1724 book, stating: "...Captain Johnson created the modern conception of pirates." Johnson's book influenced the pirate literature of Robert Louis Stevenson and J. M. Barrie.

The mystique of pirates is partly related to attributes of real pirates. For example, they wore earrings in hopes that the gold or silver would be used to pay for a decent burial when they died. They also wore earrings for superstitious reasons, believing the precious metals had magical healing powers. While pirates are commonly depicted with eyepatches, this is largely a myth originating in 19th-century novels and tales of buccaneers that included payment for a lost eye. Few historical pirates wore patches over their eyes, although some, like the 18th-century Arab pirate Rahmah ibn Jabir al-Jalhami, did. More recently, we see even less accurate depictions of historical-era pirates (e.g., Talk Like a Pirate Day), continuing the romantic image of the pirate as a treasure-burying swashbuckler in popular culture.

== See also ==
- Governance in 18th-century piracy

== Bibliography ==
- Apestegui, Cruz (2002). Pirates of the Caribbean: Buccaneers, Privateers, Freebooters and Filibusters 1493-1720. London: Conway Maritime Press. ISBN 978-0-851-77932-4.
- Chet, Guy (2014). The Ocean is a Wilderness: Atlantic Piracy and the Limits of State Authority, 1688-1856. Amherst: University of Massachusetts Press. ISBN 978-1-62534-084-9.
- Crowhurst, Patrick (1977). The Defence of British Trade, 1689-1815. Folkestone, Kent: Dawson. ISBN 978-0-7129-0699-9.
- Feder, Joshua (1997). Pirates. Smithmark Pub. ISBN 978-0-7924-5690-2.
- Flemming, Gregory N. (2014). At the Point of a Cutlass: The Pirate Capture, Bold Escape, & Lonely Exile of Philip Ashton. Lebanon, NH: ForeEdge. ISBN 978-1-61168-515-2. OCLC 863078175.
- Little, Benerson (2011). How History's Greatest Pirates Pillaged, Plundered, and Got Away With It: The Stories, Techniques, and Tactics of the Most Feared Sea Rovers from 1500-1800. Beverly, Mass: Fair Winds Press. ISBN 978-1-59233-443-8. OCLC 555627473.
- Little, Benerson (2016). The Golden Age of Piracy: The Truth Behind Pirate Myths. New York: Skyhorse Publishing. ISBN 978-1-5107-1302-4.
- Little, Benerson (2014). The Sea Rover's Practice: Pirate Tactics and Techniques, 1630-1730. Potomac Books. ISBN 9781597973250.
- Kuhn, Gabriel (2010). Life Under the Jolly Roger: Reflections on Golden Age Piracy. Oakland, Calif: PM Press. ISBN 978-1-60486-052-8. OCLC 319501250.
- Lunsford, Virginia West (2005). Piracy and Privateering in the Golden Age Netherlands. New York: Palgrave Macmillan. ISBN 978-1-4039-6692-6.
- Monod, Paul (April 1991). "Dangerous Merchandise: Smuggling, Jacobitism, and Commercial Culture in Southeast England, 1690–1760". Journal of British Studies. 30 (2): 150–182. doi:10.1086/385978. ISSN 0021-9371. JSTOR 175831.
- Moss, Jemery R. (2020). The Life and Tryals of the Gentleman Pirate, Major Stede Bonnet. Virginia Beach, VA: Köehlerbooks. ISBN 978-1-6466-3151-3.
- Pérotin-Dumon, Anne (1991). "The Pirate and the Emperor: Power and the Law on the Seas, 1450–1850". In Tracy, James D. (ed.). The Political Economy of Merchant Empires State Power and World Trade, 1350–1750. Studies in comparative early modern history. Cambridge: Cambridge University Press. pp. 196–227. doi:10.1017/cbo9780511665288.006. ISBN 978-0-521-57464-8.
- Rediker, Marcus; Ritchie, Robert C. (September 1988). "Pirates and the Imperial State". Reviews in American History. 16 (3): 351. doi:10.2307/2702264. JSTOR 2702264.
- Rediker, Marcus (2004). Villains of All Nations: Atlantic Pirates in the Golden Age. Boston: Beacon Press. ISBN 978-0-8070-5024-8.
- Sherry, Frank (2008). Raiders & Rebels: A History of the Golden Age of Piracy. New York: HarperCollins. ISBN 978-0-06-198265-1.
- Swanson, Carl E. (July 1985). "American Privateering and Imperial Warfare, 1739-1748". The William and Mary Quarterly. 42 (3): 357–382. doi:10.2307/1918932. JSTOR 1918932.
- Truxes, Thomas M. (2008). Defying Empire: Trading with the Enemy in Colonial New York. New Haven (Conn.): Yale University Press. ISBN 978-0-300-11840-7.
- Woodard, Colin (2007). The Republic of Pirates. Harcourt Trade. ISBN 978-0-15-101302-9.
