= John Ham (pirate) =

Early 18th-century pirate in the Caribbean

John Ham (Hamm, Haman, Hamann, Hain)
- Piratical career
- Nickname: Catch Him If You Can
- Type: Pirate and Privateer
- Years active: 1699-1720
- Rank: Captain
- Base of operations: Bahamas, Leeward Islands, Beef Island
- Commands: Sloop William

John Ham (Note: Last name occasionally Hamm, Hain, Haman, or Hamann.) was a pirate and privateer operating in the Caribbean in the early 18th century. He is best known for his involvement with Samuel Bellamy, Paulsgrave Williams, John Rackham, and the female pirates Anne Bonny and Mary Read.

== History ==
Formerly a house-keeper and merchant trader on St. Kitts, Ham was recorded as “poor Master of a Sloop” in the Leeward Islands as early as 1699. He had been a privateer in Queen Anne's War, during which he committed “murder of 5 or 6 Spaniards in cold blood, whom he had invited to an entertainment at his own house.” Afterwards it was said Ham could not show his face in the Leeward Islands for fear of facing murder charges until he supposedly received a pardon from Christopher Codrington, Governor of the Leeward Islands. Codrington’s successor Governor Daniel Parke drew the ire of his island’s councilmen for a host of reasons, (Note: Parke was later lynched by an angry mob of islanders.) including having given a privateering commission to Ham, “a man notoriously known to be guilty of piracy, and all manner of villanys.” Parke in 1709 countered that Ham had never requested or received a pardon for killing the Spaniards, since he was in fact escaping his capture by the Spanish, and “it was the beginning of this warr, when wee were in hostility with them.”

By 1717 Ham was living on Beef Island (one of the British Virgin Islands) where he met pirates Samuel Bellamy and Paulsgrave WIlliams, buying some of their recently captured loot. Ham escaped capture by HMS Winchelsea under Captain Bartholomew Candler, hiding his sloop in small creeks until Winchelsea departed.

In September 1720, Bahamas Governor Woodes Rogers issued a proclamation for the capture of John Rackham, Anne Bonny, Mary Read, and the rest of Rackham’s crew for the theft of Ham’s 12-ton, 6-gun sloop William. Rackham and the William were soon spotted by Jean Bonadvis, and were caught shortly afterwards by privateer Jonathan Barnet.

== Johnson’s A General History of the Pyrates account ==
Charles Johnson’s The History of the Pyrates. Vol. II is an only marginally reliable source; while it contains many historical details and accounts, they are mixed in with sensationalized stories, dramatized accounts, and fictional pieces. His account of Rackham stealing Ham’s sloop William is frequently cited though its details cannot be confirmed by other sources. In Johnson’s version, Ham (here called Haman) was known as an enemy of the Spanish, looting them before escaping in his sloop, “one of the swiftest Sailors that ever was built of that Kind,” leading to the saying “There goes John Haman, catch him if you can.” Rackham sent Anne Bonny to spy on Ham, who asked innocent questions while noting any defenses or crew aboard. Using her information, Rackham led a crew to capture William in the night, Bonny threatening two sailors aboard to keep them quiet. They released the two captive sailors as they evaded a guard ship but were at sea only a short time before they were captured.

== See also ==
- Jacob Hall (pirate) - another ex-buccaneer given a commission by Parke.
