= Mistress of the Seas =

1964 novel by John Carlova

- Title page for Mistress of the Seas (1964)
- Author: John Carlova
- Language: English
- Subject: Anne Bonny
- Genre: historical drama
- Publisher: Citadel Press
- Publication date: 1964
- Publication place: USA

Mistress of the Seas is a 1964 novel by John Carlova based on the life of pirate Anne Bonny.

== Background ==
In 1952 writer John Carlova was researching another project at the British Museum when he read about Anne Bonny. He later researched Bonny's life in the West Indies and tried to sell the idea of a book on her to publishers but none were interested. A magazine expressed interest in a shorter version, and Carlova wrote an 80,000 word piece. However, the magazine only wanted a short article, which Carlova wrote. In 1962 a publisher's representative read the article in a magazine in a barber and became excited about the possibilities of the story as a book, "a kind of seagoing Forever Amber." He asked Carlova if he was interested in adapting it and Carlova submitted the 80,000 word manuscript. It was accepted for publication by Citadel Press.

== Historical Accuracy ==
Although Carlova claimed the information in Mistress of the Sea was all true, many historians strongly believe it to merely be a work of fiction. David Fictum calls the novel "fiction" and claims it is the origin of Bonny's parents' names, William Cormac and Peg Brennan. Journalist Tony Bartelme noted that while Carlova claimed extensive archival research, he does not cite or include specific sources backing up his numerous claims.

== Adaptation into film ==
A number of attempts were made to turn the book into a film, including:

- In 1978, Tony Williams of the Rank Organisation announced Rank would make a film based on the novel.
- In 1981, Bo Derek was attached to star in a version of the novel directed by her husband John Derek.
- In the early 1990s, Paul Verhoeven was going to direct a film version starring Geena Davis.
