= Tony Williams (film executive) =

Tony Williams was an executive best known for his long association with the Rank Organisation, including a stint as head of production in the late 1970s. This ended when Rank decided to cease funding films altogether.

Williams joined Rank as a trainee in the late 1960s and worked in theatre management and exhibition. He was appointed head of production for Rank in 1977. According to film critic Alexander Walker, "his enthusiasm was boundless; his knowledge of boardroom politics and organisation rivalries was narrower. Like Bryan Forbes at EMI, he now found his own company's distribution outfit was not always the most eager taker for many of the pictures he put into production".

In his time at Rank the company produced eight films at a cost of £10 million, resulting in a loss of £1.6 million. The films were:

- Wombling Free
- The Thirty Nine Steps
- The Lady Vanishes
- The Riddle of the Sands
- Tarka the Otter
- Eagle's Wing
- Bad Timing
- Silver Dream Racer

Walker later wrote of Williams' slate that "they were in truth an odd lot: the overriding formula seemed to be 'something for everyone' – the predictable end result was 'nothing for anyone'." He added that, "apart from Bad Timing all these Rank films were determinedly 'clean-faced'."

Films he announced but did not make include:

- The Mistress of the Seas – a 17th-century swashbuckler based on the novel by John Carlova
- Sky Fall – a science fiction movie based on the novel by Harry Harrison. Williams then worked for the Rank film archive, then briefly attempted a career as an independent producer.

== Sources ==
- Walker, Alexander, National Heroes: British Cinema in the Seventies and Eighties (London: Harrap, 1985).
