= Anne Bonny =

Female pirate (died 1733)

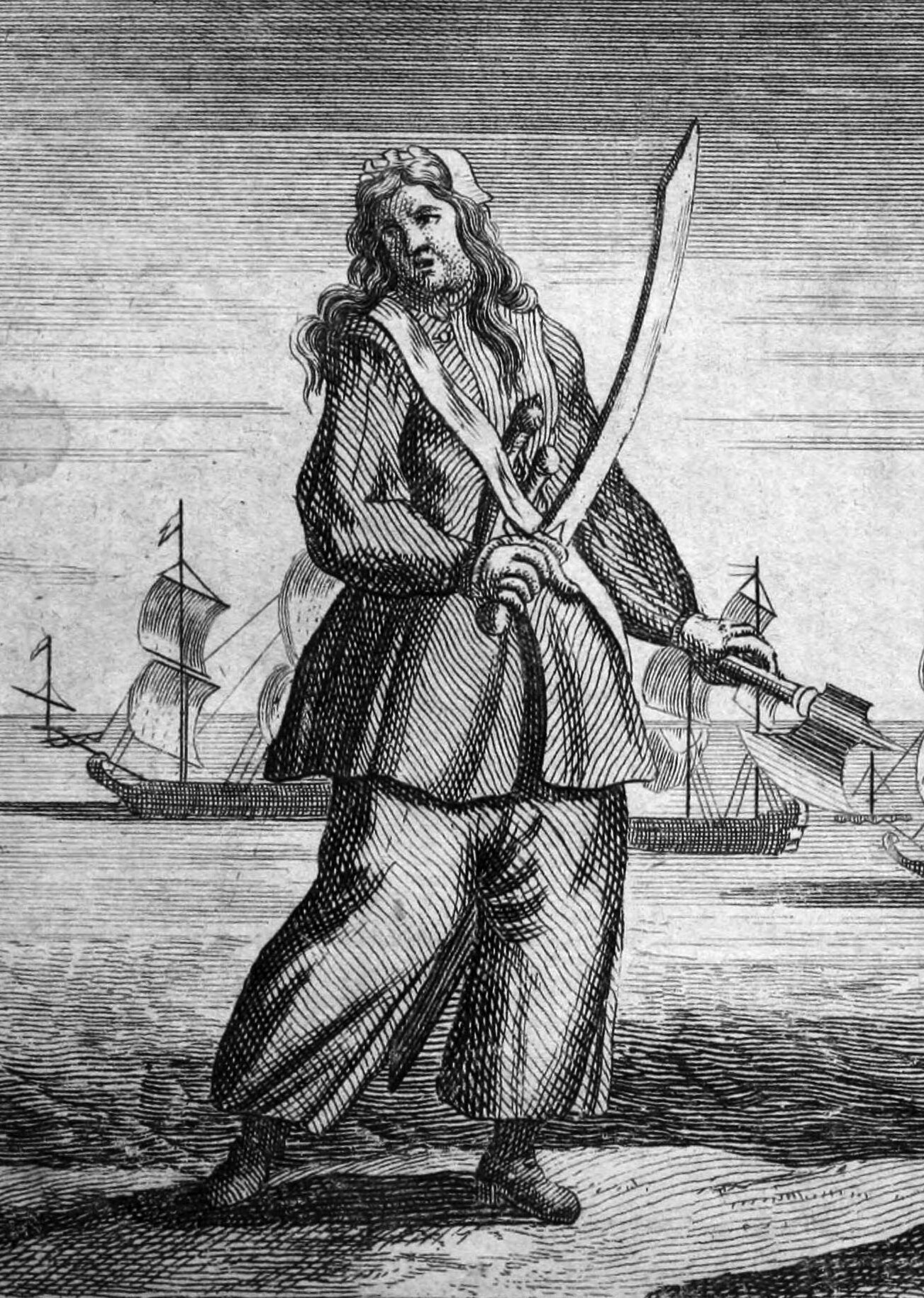
- 1724 engraving of Bonny from A General History of the Pyrates.
- Died: 1733
- Piratical career
- Type: Pirate
- Allegiance: John Rackham
- Years active: August – October 1720
- Rank: Powder monkey
- Base of operations: West Indies

Anne Bonny (Note: Some contemporary sources refer to her as Ann Bonn and Ann Fulford. A few contemporary newspapers such as The Post-Boy referred to her as Sarah Bonny, although this is likely a conflation with a similarly named woman in Jamaica. Bonny in primary sources often is called Ann without the E, this was due to inconsistent name spelling and little more. This article will mostly spell it as Anne.) (likely died December 1733) was a pirate who served under John Rackham. Amongst the few recorded female pirates in the Golden Age of Piracy, she has become one of the most recognized pirates of the era, as well as the history of piracy in general.

Much of Bonny's background is unknown. The first biography of Bonny comes from Captain Charles Johnson's 1724 book A General History of the Pyrates. According to Johnson, Bonny was born in Ireland, the illegitimate daughter of an attorney and his servant. Bonny and her father later moved to Carolina, where she married a sailor. Although Johnson's version of events has become popular over the centuries, there is little evidence to support it.

At an unknown date, Bonny travelled to the Bahamas where she became acquainted with the pirate John Rackham. In August 1720, Bonny joined Rackham's crew, alongside another female pirate, Mary Read. Together they stole the sloop William owned by John Ham from Nassau on 22 August 1720. Rackham and his crew carried out a number of attacks on merchant ships in the West Indies until they were captured by former privateer Jonathan Barnet following a brief naval engagement on 22 October 1720 near Jamaica. Rackham, along with all male crew members, were tried, sentenced, and executed, but Bonny and Read had their executions stayed due to both of them claiming to be pregnant. Read died in jail around mid April 1721, but Bonny was likely let go at an unknown point, living until 1733.

== Early life ==
Bonny's date and place of birth are unknown. (Note: Commonly cited dates include 1697, 1698, 1700, and 1702. All sources on date of birth were written centuries after Bonny's trial and cannot be corroborated.) Nothing definitive is known about her early life. No primary source, including her own trial transcript, makes mention of her age or nation of origin. No Anne Bonny born in the late 17th or early 18th century has been found in the baptism records of Ireland, and it is possible she was not of Irish origin. There exists the baptism record of an Ann Bonny from 1690 London at St Giles in the Fields church but it cannot be proven beyond all doubt to be her. Bonny is not noted to have been a colonist of Nassau prior to it becoming a pirates nest in 1713 under Benjamin Hornigold. Before 22 August 1720, little can be definitively said about Bonny's early life.

=== Early life according to A General History of the Pyrates ===
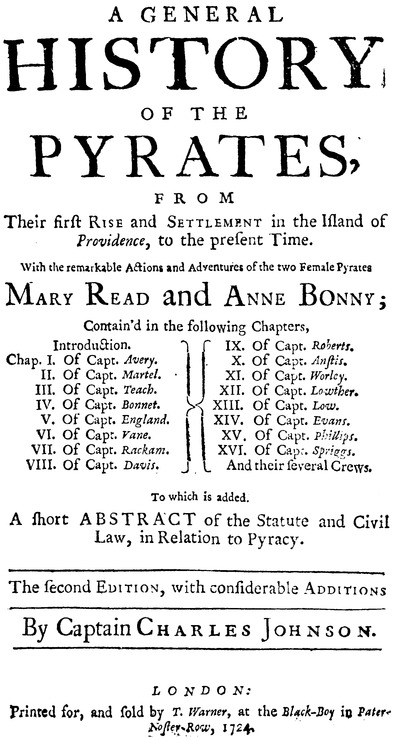
Front cover of A General History of the Pyrates. Starting in the second edition, Anne Bonny's name, alongside Mary Read's, were put in notably larger font than better known pirates like Blackbeard or Charles Vane.

All details concerning Bonny's early life stem from Captain Charles Johnson's A General History of the Pyrates (a greatly unreliable series of pirate biographies). Johnson claimed that Bonny was born in a town near Cork in the Kingdom of Ireland at an unspecified year. She was the daughter of a servant woman named Mary, and her employer, an unnamed attorney. Later versions of this story would refer to the attorney as William Cormac and the mother as Peg/Mary Brennan. These are fictional names first written down in John Carlova's 1964 romance novel Mistress of the Seas, which has been quoted as fact for many years by historians such as David Cordingly.

The attorney's unnamed wife had become ill and was moved to her mother-in-law's home a few miles away to be cared for. While his wife was away for four months, the attorney began an affair with Mary. The attorney's wife discovered the affair following a comical mix up concerning silver spoons.

This theatrical misunderstanding began with a tanner Mary knew stealing three silver spoons and hiding them in her bed. Mary called a constable on the man, but the spoons were not found. Upon the wife's return, the tanner told her the entire story about stealing silver spoons, but confessed it was only a joke. The wife found the three silver spoons in Mary's bed as the tanner had claimed. She became suspicious however, the tanner had noted he had hidden the silver spoons days ago. The wife questioned why Mary had not been sleeping in her bed. The wife then assumed her husband had been unfaithful the past four months. The wife stayed in the bed and waited for the attorney, who called for Mary and laid in her bed, confirming the affair. The wife then put the silver spoons back into the bed, and when Mary went to sleep, she found them and hid them in her trunk. The wife later accused Mary of theft and called a constable, who wrongfully arrested her. With the affair exposed, the wife separated from the attorney and moved to a different home.

Mary became pregnant from the affair and gave birth to a daughter, Anne, while in prison. After Anne's birth, Mary was let go out of pity. The attorney's mother in law died not long after, leaving a major source of income to be an allowance which his estranged wife gave him out of sympathy.

How Johnson was aware of the theft of spoons and the exact nature of Anne's birth, is never revealed.

Because everyone in town knew Mary had given birth to a bastard daughter, the attorney raised Anne as a boy, claiming she was the child of a friend. The attorney even hoped to raise Anne as a clerk. The attorney's wife soon found out who the child was, and cut off any allowance she had been giving him. The attorney in response ended the ruse and openly lived with Anne as his daughter, but this scandal damaged his reputation and few locals wished to work with him. The attorney was forced to move elsewhere.

The attorney first moved to Cork, but this proved not far enough. The attorney then moved to the Province of Carolina, taking along Anne and her mother Mary. At first, the attorney attempted to continue his law career, but eventually became a merchant instead. He proved quite successful as a merchant, earning enough money to buy a large plantation. At an undisclosed period of time, Mary died. Anne Bonny was now grown up.

Johnson claims that Bonny possessed a fierce temper, such as supposedly stabbing a maid to death with a knife, a claim he immediately finds groundless. He also says she once beat a man severely for attempting to rape her.

There is no documented example of an attorney becoming a plantation owner in the Carolinas in the 17th and 18th century and having a daughter named Anne.

The attorney expected Bonny to marry a good man, instead she married a poor sailor. The attorney was so outraged he threw her out. In the original volume of A General History, the sailor husband is unnamed. In A General History volume II released in 1728, the sailor is named James Bonny.

After being kicked out, Anne and James Bonny moved to Nassau, on New Providence Island, known as a sanctuary for pirates. Johnson claims that, after the arrival of Governor Woodes Rogers in the summer of 1718, James Bonny became a minor officer for the governor after taking a pardon. Anne cared little for James and frequently cheated on him. James Bonny serving Woodes Rogers is highly unlikely, as no James Bonny is noted in Captain Vincent Pearse's list of pirates who took the Kings Pardon. No documentation outside of A General History even confirms there was a James Bonny, making it possible he is one of Johnson's fictional creations, similar to Captain Misson.

== John Rackham and piracy ==
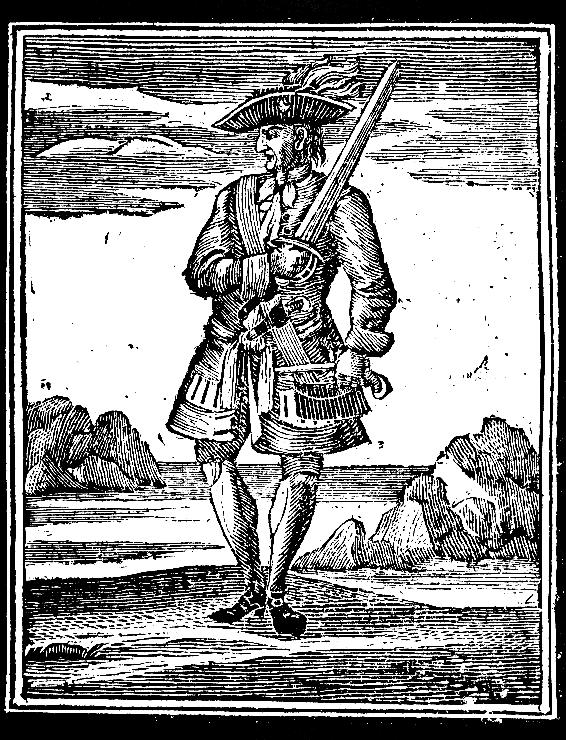
1724 woodcut of John Rackham from A General History of the Pyrates.

While in Nassau, Bonny at some point met John Rackham. The nature of his relationship with her is unclear; A General History claims it was romantic, while her own trial transcript says nothing on the matter. She was likely well acquainted with Rackham by the summer of 1720, after the end of the War of the Quadruple Alliance and two years into the reign of Governor Rogers.

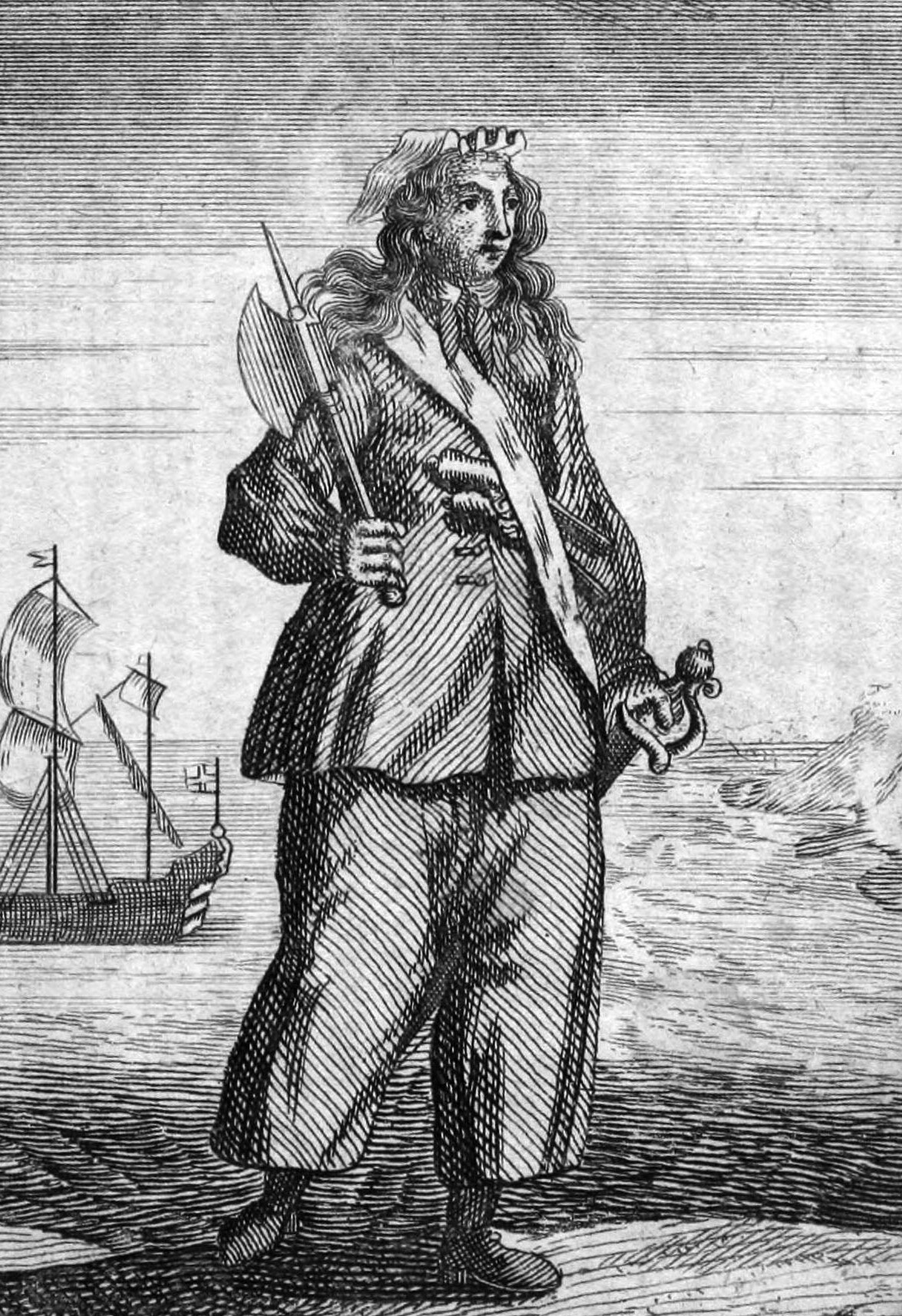
1724 engraving of Mary Read from A General History of the Pyrates

On 22 August 1720, Bonny, Rackham, and another woman, Mary Read, together with about 13 other male pirate crewmembers, stole the sloop William from former pirate and privateer John Ham, then at anchor in Nassau harbor, and put out to sea. The crew spent two months in the West Indies attacking merchant ships. Bonny took part in piracy alongside the men, handing out gunpowder to fellow pirates, a job usually referred to as a powder monkey. On 5 September 1720, Governor Rogers put out a proclamation, later published in The Boston Gazette on 17 October, demanding the arrest of Rackham and his associates. Among those named are Anne Bonny and Mary Read.

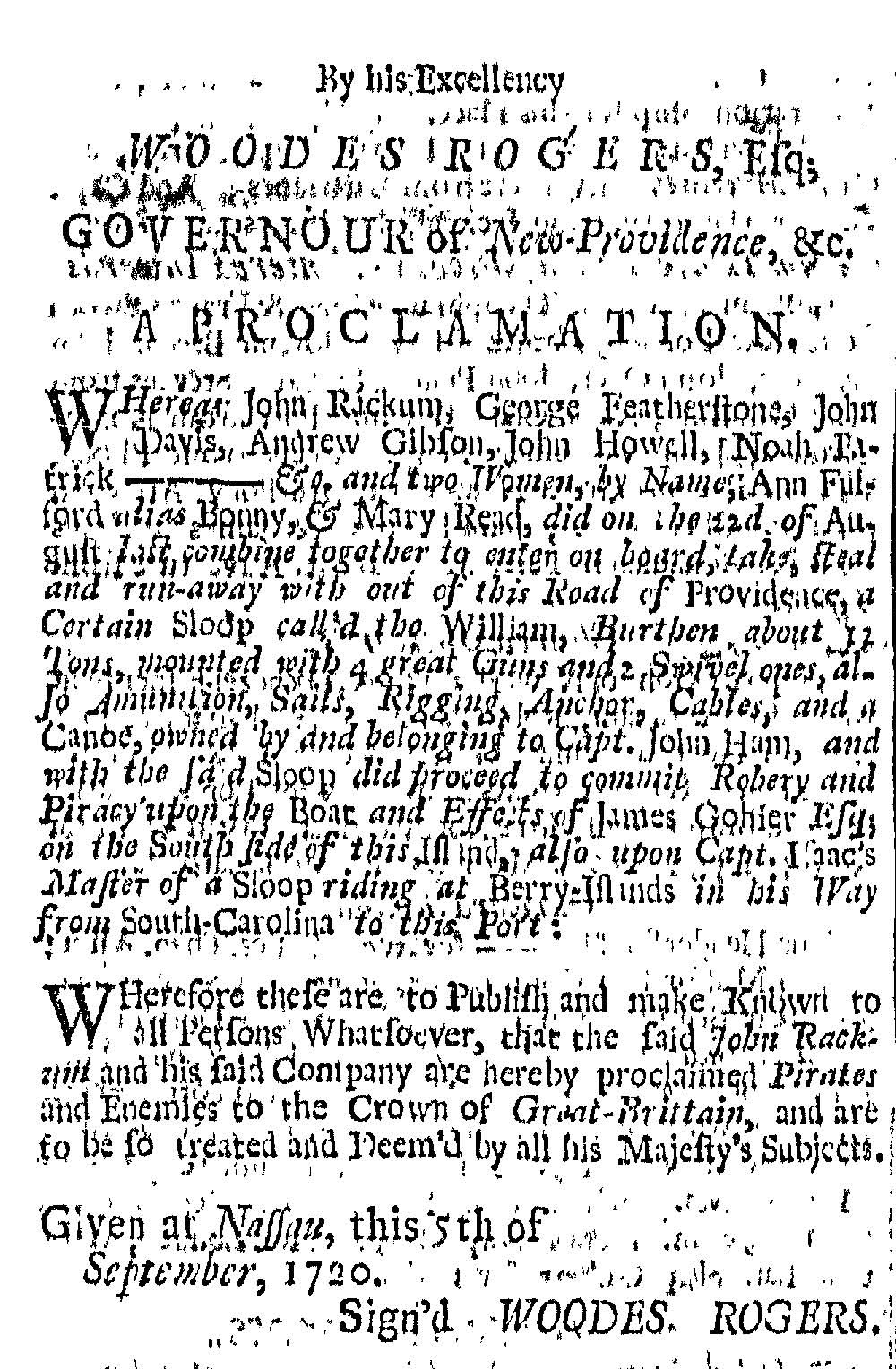
Proclamation issued by governor Rogers 5 September 1720 that mentions Anne Bonny as a member of Rackham's crew. She is specifically called Ann Fulford alias Bonny.

A General History claims Bonny eventually fell in love with another pirate on board, only to discover it was Mary Read. To abate the jealousy of Rackham, who suspected romantic involvement between the two, Bonny told him that Read was a woman and swore him to secrecy. This is unlikely, since Rogers' proclamation names both women openly. Later drawings of Bonny and Read would emphasise their femininity, although this too likely did not reflect reality.

A victim of the pirates, Dorothy Thomas of Jamaica, described in detail Bonny and Read's appearance during their trial. She said they "wore men's jackets, and long trousers, and handkerchiefs tied about their heads: and ... each of them had a machete and pistol in their hands and they cursed and swore at the men to murder her." Thomas also recorded that she knew that they were women, "from the largeness of their breasts."

== Capture and imprisonment ==
On 22 October 1720, Rackham and his crew were discovered near Negril Point by a sloop captained by Jonathan Barnet, a former privateer. Rackham and his crew briefly resisted, but surrendered soon after the fight began. What Bonny and Read did during the fight is unclear. A General History claims Bonny and Read were the only ones to fight back, but the trial transcript does not support this claim. A General History also claims Read killed one of her fellow pirates in a rage, nobody was reported to have died in the engagement. They were taken to Jamaica where, in groups, they were tried for the crime of piracy. Rackham was tried on 16 November in front of Nicholas Lawes governor of Jamaica. Rackham was quickly found guilty. His execution at Port Royal was carried out two days later on 18 November. His remains were subsequently gibbeted.

Bonny was tried for piracy alongside Mary Read in Spanish Town on 28 November. Like Rackham, the trial was short and the verdict inevitable. After calling four witnesses and a brief period of discussion, Governor Lawes found Bonny and Read guilty of piracy and sentenced them both to be hanged.

With the judgement pronounced, Bonny and Read both "pleaded their bellies", asking for mercy because they were pregnant. A jury of matrons likely granted them a stay of execution until they gave birth, but it is also likely the claim was false to delay their deaths. Read died in prison of unknown causes around April 1721. A burial registry for Saint Catherine Parish lists her burial on 28 April 1721 as, "Mary Read, Pirate".

== Fate ==
There is no record of Bonny's release, and this has led to much speculation as to her fate. Captain Charles Johnson writes in A General History that: "She was continued in Prison, to the Time of her lying in, and afterward reprieved from Time to Time; but what is become of her since we cannot tell; only this we know, that she was not executed".

Claims of Bonny being freed by family intervention and moving to the American colonies, dying around the end of the century, are unlikely and appear to originate from John Carlova's Mistress of the Seas. Such claims were later amplified by Tamara Eastman and Constance Bond's 2000 book The Pirate Trial of Anne Bonny and Mary Read, which claimed Bonny lived until 1782. The later works of David Cordingly such as Heroines and Harlots: Women at Sea in the Great Age of Sail, extensively quoted Eastman and Bond. The supposed evidence was "family papers in the collection of descendants," and a family bible. This evidence was later proven to be false.

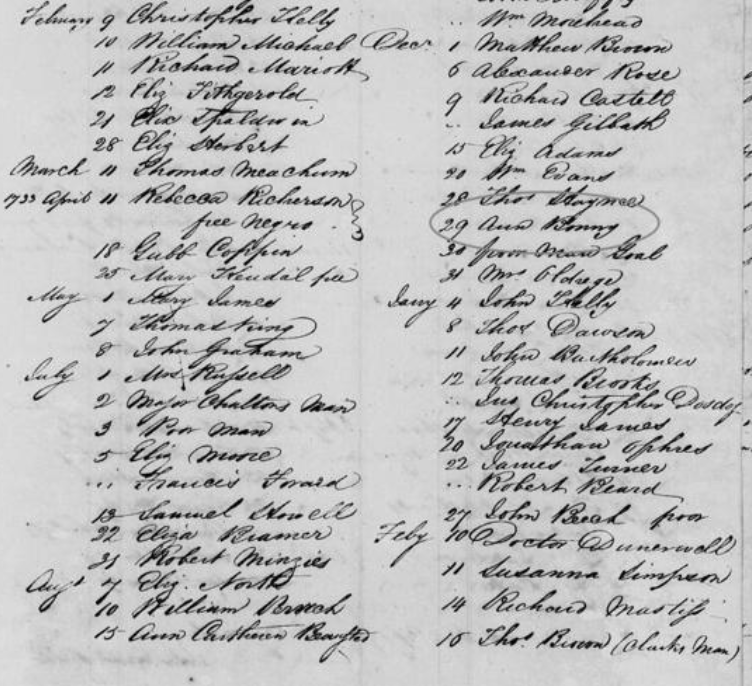
Burial record of an Ann Bonny in Saint Catherine's Parish, 29 December 1733. The record is circled.

A burial register for Saint Catherine Parish, which includes Spanish Town where Bonny was tried, lists the burial of an "Ann Bonny" on 29 December 1733. This woman was buried without family being listed nor with a fanfare. The burial was unmarked, no tombstone was used. If it is the Anne Bonny, then she may have lived a nondescript life in Jamaica years after her piracy career ended.

== Legacy ==
Despite a career of only 61 days, Anne Bonny is among the most famous pirates in recorded history, primarily due to her gender. Within a decade, Bonny-inspired characters were already appearing in contemporary culture. The first notable inspiration is Jenny Diver in John Gay's 1729 ballad opera Polly. Despite already appearing in Gay's previous play The Beggars Opera, and being based on the historical Jenny Diver, her characterization in Polly is blatantly Bonny.

In the 19th century, literature such as Charles Ellms' Pirates Own Book discussed Bonny at length, often with illustrations. An 1888 cigarette card depicted Bonny as a redhead, a trait that continues to this day despite no evidence supporting it. Swashbuckling cinema often included a dashing redhaired woman or female pirate companion, occasionally directly naming Bonny.

By the 21st century, Bonny has appeared in hundreds of books, movies, songs, stage shows, TV programs, and video games. Almost every female pirate character, is in some form, inspired by Anne Bonny. Various rumors and legends attributed to Bonny, such as burying treasure, have spread near and far, despite being false.

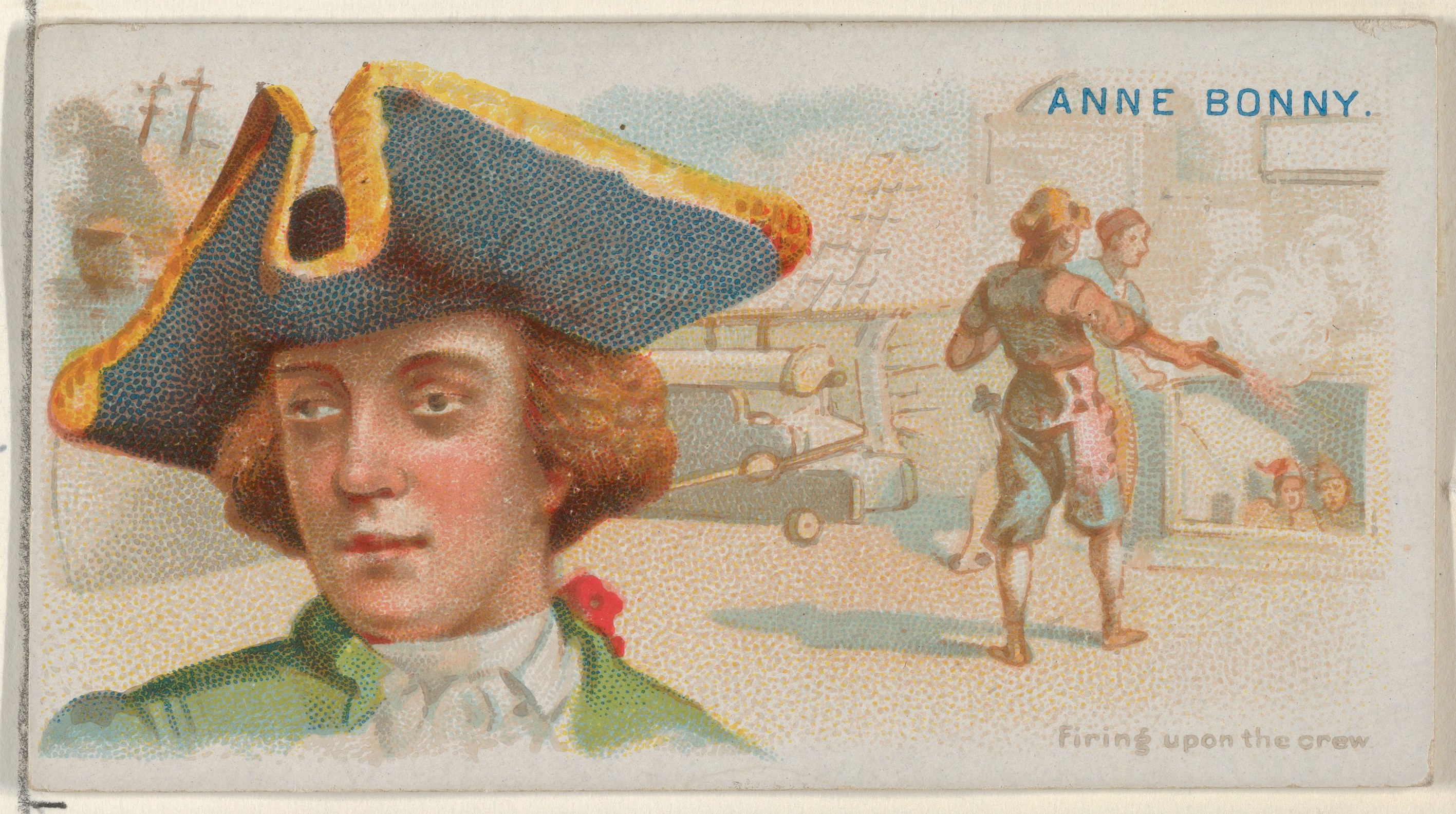
Anne Bonny, Firing Upon the Crew, from the Pirates of the Spanish Main series (N19) for Allen & Ginter Cigarettes MET DP835030

=== Speculation of Bonny's sexuality ===
Since 1725, a number of writers have claimed that Anne Bonny was the lesbian lover of Mary Read. This was never stated in the trial transcript or newspapers, and only begins to appear after much of Bonny's legend was written, and by highly suspect sources.

The first written appearance of this claim is in an unauthorized reproduction of A General History titled, The History and Lives of All the Most Notorious Pirates and Their Crews, released a year after the real A General History. In the passage describing the trial of Bonny and Read, the book briefly says they were lovers. Since A General History is itself unreliable, this claim cannot be trusted. History and Lives is the only book to claim Bonny and Read were lovers for almost a century. A chapbook knock off of History and Lives again repeated the claim verbatim in 1813, but outside a handful of late 19th century literature, discussion of Bonny's sexuality only really began in the 20th century. (Note: The book was titled The Extraordinary Adventures and Daring Exploits of Captain Henry Morgan, but appears to be a 34 page abridged plagiarized version of History and Lives.)

This claim briefly appeared again in 1914, via sexologist Magnus Hirschfeld's book, The Homosexuality of Men and Women. Much like History and Lives, it contains a mere one sentence claim that Mary Read was a lesbian.

The claim that Bonny and Read were lesbians largely entered popular understanding via the Baltimore born radical feminist Susan Baker's 1972 article, "Anne Bonny & Mary Read: They Killed Pricks" published in a newspaper run by the Washington DC lesbian separatist organization, The Furies Collective. The article was later included in The Furies book, Women Remembered. This article inspired writers such as Steve Gooch, which in turn influenced many media depictions.

In 2020, a statue of Bonny and Read was unveiled at Execution Dock in Wapping, London. The statues were created in part for the podcast series Hellcats, which centers on a lesbian relationship between Bonny and Read. The statues themselves are abstract depictions of Bonny and Read, claiming that one emotionally completed the other. It was originally planned for the statues to be permanently placed on Burgh Island in south Devon, but these plans were withdrawn after complaints of glamorizing piracy, and because Bonny and Read have no association with the island. The statues were eventually accepted by Lewes F.C. in 2023.

Ultimately, it is impossible to determine if Anne Bonny was Mary Read's lover. Neither woman left any primary sources behind, and sources such as the trial transcript make no mention of their personal lives.

=== In popular culture ===
The following is not an exhaustive list

- Bonny appears as a character in the 1944 American novel Lusty Wind for Carolina by Inglis Fletcher.
- Binnie Barnes portrays Bonny in Frank Borzage's 1945 RKO film The Spanish Main.
- Jean Peters portrays a character based on Anne Bonny called captain Anne Providence in the 1951 film Anne of the Indies, itself based on a 1947 article by Herbert Ravenel Sass.
- Hope Emerson portrays Bonny in the film Double Crossbones (1951).
- Bonny was portrayed by Diana Quick in the 1978 RSC production of The Women-Pirates Anne Bonney and Mary Read by Steve Gooch, at the Aldwych Theatre in London.
- Both Bonny and Mary Read are mentioned in the lyrics of "Five Guns West" by Adam and the Ants from their 1981 album Prince Charming.
- Jewelry Bonney, a female pirate in Eiichiro Oda's manga One Piece, is named after Anne Bonny.
- "Anne Bonny" is the title of the second track off of Death Grips 2013 album Government Plates.
- Bonny prominently appears in the video game Assassin's Creed IV: Black Flag, and its remake Assassin's Creed Black Flag Resynced, voiced by Sarah Greene.
- Bonny was portrayed by Clara Paget in the Starz TV Series Black Sails.
- Bonny is a main character in the 2021 Netflix docuseries The Lost Pirate Kingdom, where she is portrayed by Mia Tomlinson.
- Minnie Driver portrayed Bonny in the episode "Fun and Games" in the second season of the HBO Max series Our Flag Means Death.
- Bonny's story was the subject of a 2018 single and 2020 album by the artist Karliene.

== See also ==
- Mary Read, Mary Critchett, and Martha Farley, the other confirmed women active in the Golden Age of Piracy
- Grace O'Malley
- Zheng Yi Sao
- Rachel Wall
- Mary Wolverston
