= Rachel Wall =

American pirate (1760–1789)

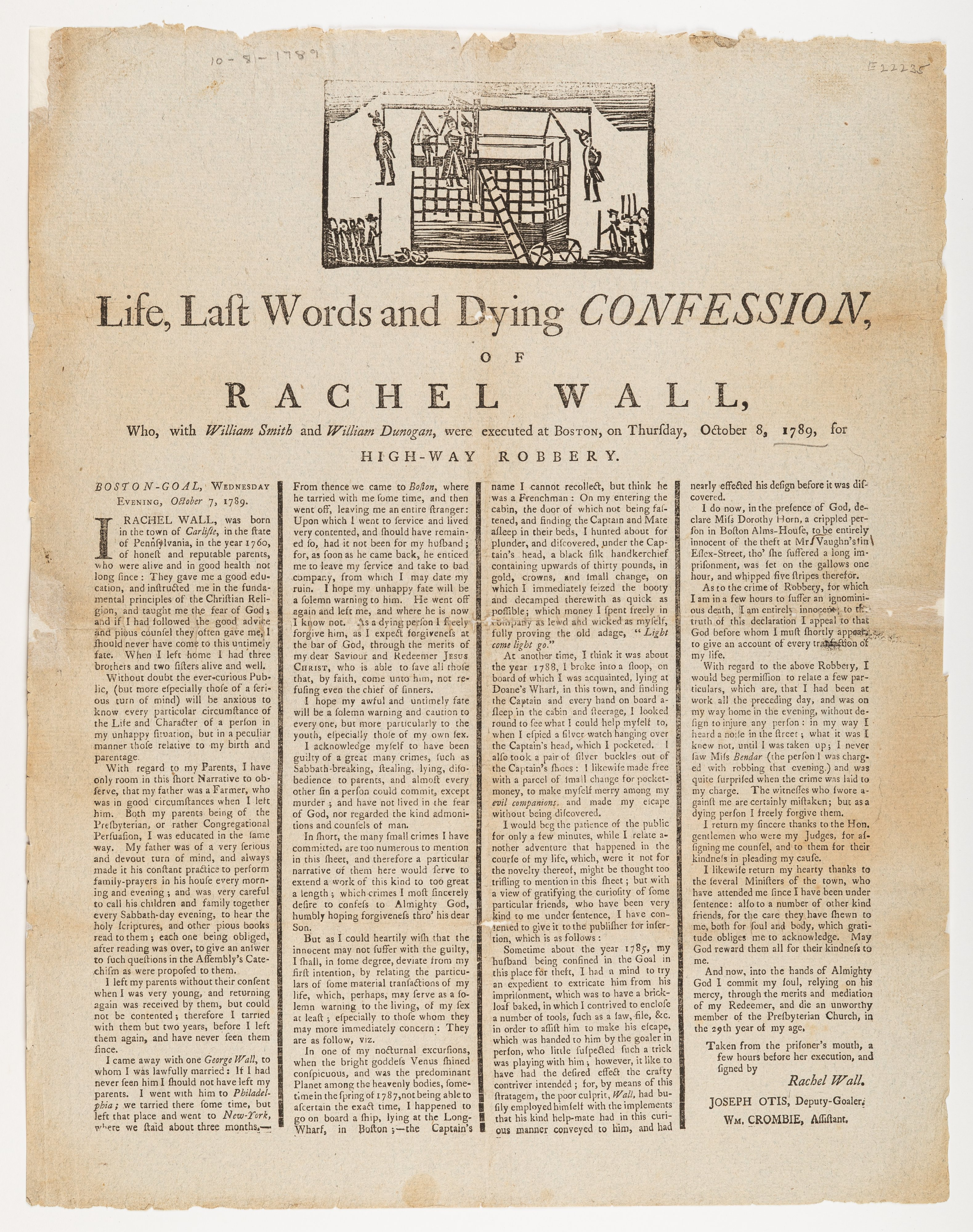
- 1789 broadsheet of her confession
- Born: c. 1760; Carlisle, Pennsylvania Colony
- Died: 8 October 1789 (age 29); Boston, Massachusetts, United States
- Cause of death: Execution by hanging
- Piratical career
- Type: Pirate
- Allegiance: United States
- Years active: 1781–1782
- Base of operations: New Hampshire

Rachel Wall (c. October 1, 1760 – October 8, 1789) was an American female pirate, and the last woman to be hanged in Massachusetts. She has been described as one of the first notable American-born woman to become a pirate.

== Early life ==
Wall was born Rachel Schmidt in Carlisle, in the Province of Pennsylvania, to a family of devout Presbyterians. She lived on a farm outside Carlisle, but was not happy, and spent most of her time at a waterfront. While at the waterfront, she was attacked by a group of girls, and rescued by a man named George Wall. The two later married.

== Career as a pirate ==
Wall and her husband moved to Boston, where he took a job on a fishing schooner. When George came back, he brought with him five sailors and their lovers, and persuaded Wall to join them. In one week, the party had spent all their money and the schooner set sail again, upon which George suggested they all become pirates. He borrowed another schooner from a friend, and the party set sail.

Wall and her crew worked in the Isle of Shoals, just off the New Hampshire coast. After storms Wall would stand on the deck and scream for help. When passers-by came to give aid, they were killed and all their goods stolen. The crew was successful in capturing 12 boats, stealing $6,000 cash, an indeterminate amount of valuables, and killing 24 sailors, all between 1781 and 1782.

== Arrest and execution ==
Eventually, after her husband and the crew washed out to sea by accident, Wall returned to Boston and resumed her role as a servant. However, she still enjoyed going to the docks and sneaking into harbored boats, stealing things from inside. Her final robbery occurred when she saw a young woman named Margaret Bender, wearing a bonnet which she coveted. She attempted to steal the bonnet and rip Margaret's tongue out, but was caught and arrested. She was tried for robbery on September 10, 1789, but requested that she be tried as a pirate, while maintaining that she had never killed anyone. However, she was found guilty of robbery and sentenced to be hanged on October 8, 1789. She is said to have stated "...into the hands of the Almighty God I commit my soul, relying on his mercy...and die an unworthy member of the Presbyterian Church, in the 29th year of my age" as her final words. Her death marked the last occasion a woman was hanged in Massachusetts.

== Female pirate narratives ==
Stories of female pirates arose during a time of cultural change, when ideas of femininity were in flux. Thomas Laqueur notes that this era redefined male and female identities, while Michael McKeon argues that the modern patriarchal sex/gender system took shape in the eighteenth century, politicizing gender. Representations of women’s bodies then helped set new boundaries between the normal and the deviant, shaping modern sexual identity.

Accounts of women who committed crimes often contrasted with those of men, since their actions were viewed as violations of expected gender roles. Because of this, stories about female offenders frequently broke away from the usual biographical conventions. Inexpensive popular literature, such as ballads, broadsides, and pamphlets, helped spread these tales to the public. These publications included “gallows literature” reporting criminals’ final speeches or confessions, as well as trial reports and short biographies of well-known female offenders such in the case of Rachel Wall.

== See also ==
- Anne Bonny, Mary Read, Mary Critchett, and Martha Farley, the four confirmed women active in the Golden Age of Piracy.
- Grace O'Malley
- Zheng Yi Sao
- Mary Wolverston
