= Mary Critchett =

English pirate

Mary Critchett (possibly died 1729, first name also Maria, last name also Crichett or Crickett) was an English pirate and convict. She is best known for being one of only four confirmed female pirates from the Golden Age of Piracy, and the only one executed.

== History ==
Six prisoners - "Edmund Williams, George Caves, George Cole alias Sanders, Edward Edwards, Jeremiah Smith and Mary Critchett" - were transported from England to Virginia in late 1728, to work off their sentences. On 12 May 1729, they escaped and overpowered the two-man crew of the sloop John and Elizabeth. Critchett held the prisoners in the ship's hold, sitting on the hatch to prevent their escape. They released the pair a few days later over Critchett's objections, who feared the two would alert the authorities. The pirates sailed into Chesapeake Bay but before they could raid any other ships, they were captured by HMS Shoreham under Captain Long. Returned to Virginia, they were tried in August 1729 in Williamsburg, convicted of piracy, and sentenced to hang, although no record exists proving Critchett was executed.

== See also ==
- Anne Bonny, Mary Read, and Martha Farley, the other confirmed women active in the Golden Age of Piracy.
- Women in piracy
- Grace O'Malley
- Zheng Yi Sao
- Rachel Wall
- Mary Wolverston
