= Mary Read =

English female pirate (died 1721)

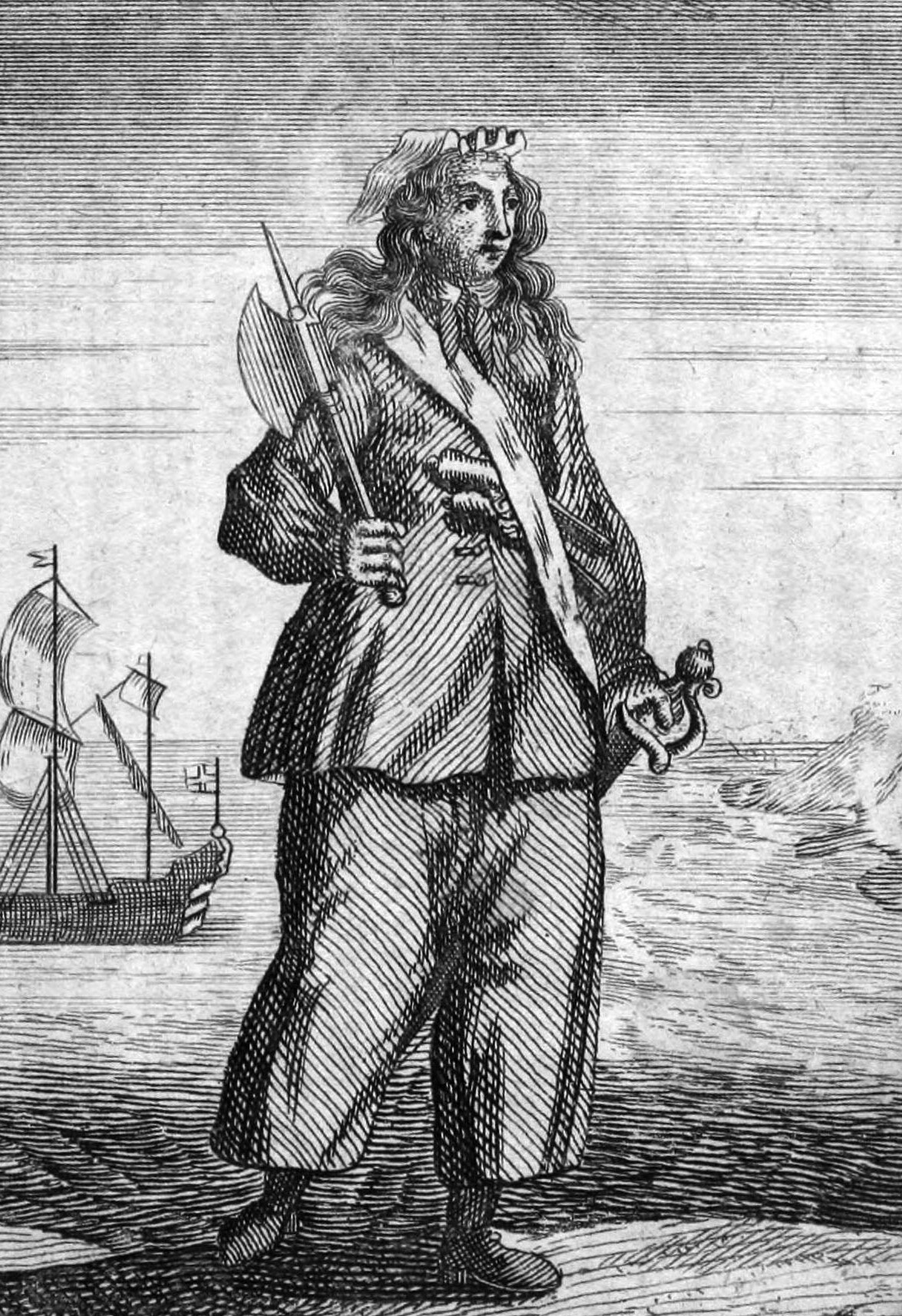
- 1724 engraving of Read from A General History of the Pyrates
- Died: April 1721; Spanish Town, Colony of Jamaica
- Resting place: Saint Catherine Parish, Jamaica
- Piratical career
- Type: Pirate
- Allegiance: John Rackham
- Years active: August – October 1720
- Base of operations: West Indies

Mary Read (died April 1721) was an English pirate who served under John Rackham. She and Anne Bonny were among the few female pirates during the "Golden Age of Piracy".

Much of Read's background is unknown. The first biography of Read comes from Captain Charles Johnson's 1724 book, A General History of the Pyrates. According to Johnson, Read was born in England, dressed as a boy much of her childhood, eventually joined the military and later moved to the West Indies. Although Johnson's version of events has become popular over the centuries, there is little evidence to support it.

At an unknown date, Read traveled to the Bahamas where she became acquainted with the pirate John Rackham. In August 1720, Read joined Rackham's crew, alongside another female pirate, Anne Bonny. Together they stole the sloop William owned by John Ham from Nassau on 22 August 1720. Rackham and his crew carried out a number of attacks on merchant ships in the West Indies until they were captured by former privateer Jonathan Barnet following a brief naval engagement on 22 October 1720 near Jamaica. Rackham, along with all the male crew members, were tried, sentenced, and executed, but Read and Bonny both claimed to be pregnant during their trials and received a stay of execution.

While Anne Bonny’s fate is unknown, Mary Read died while imprisoned in Spanish Town around late April 1721 of an unknown cause, likely a fever.

== Early life ==
Read's date and place of birth are unknown. Nothing definitive is known about her early life. No primary source, including her own trial's transcript, makes mention of her age or nation of origin. Unlike Anne Bonny, numerous Mary Reads were born in the late 17th century across England, making it difficult to figure which one is the future pirate.

Possible suspects include a Mary Read born in Bristol around May 1681, whose father John became a Madagascar pirate before dying of an unknown cause. Her mother Ann Canterell wrote a letter to Adam Baldridge in 1698 asking for her husband’s wealth, never receiving a reply.

Another possibility is the Mary Read who signed the Breholt Petition in 1708. The petition, sent to Queen Anne, included the signatures or marks of 48 individuals related to pirates still on Madagascar. It was hoped this plea would encourage the issuing of a general pardon to the pirates; Breholt expected to recover some of the stolen goods. The signatures were collected by the writer Penelope Aubin. One of the 48 names is a mark for Mary Read, indicating she was literate. The petition ultimately failed and no pardon was issued.

Whether the pirate Mary Read was one of these two women, none of them, or both is unclear at best.

Read is not noted to have been a colonist of Nassau before 1713. Before 22 August 1720, little can be definitively said about Read's early life.

=== Early life according to A General History of the Pyrates ===
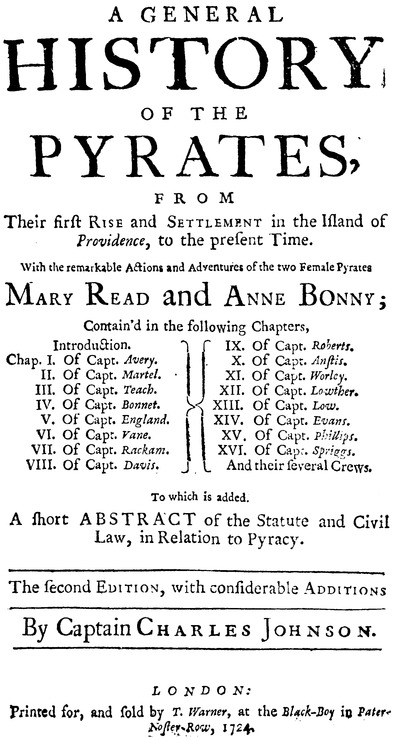
Mary Read's name, alongside Anne Bonny's, is in notably larger font than other more notable pirates like Blackbeard or Charles Vane.

All details concerning Read's early life stem from Captain Charles Johnson's A General History of the Pyrates (a greatly unreliable series of pirate biographies). Johnson claimed that Read was born at an unknown date in London in the Kingdom of England.

Read's unnamed mother married a sailor, with whom she had a son. The husband then went on a sea voyage, never to return. Despite lacking a husband, Read's mother became pregnant again. To avoid the stigma of bearing an Illegitimate child the mother moved from London to the countryside. The boy did not live long; he died in infancy before he was one year old. Shortly after the boy’s death, the mother gave birth to a girl, named Mary.

When Mary Read's mother ran out of money, she turned to her late husband's wealthy mother for support. To get support, Read's mother dressed her in boys’ clothing, to appear to be her deceased brother. The deception worked, and the mother-in-law gave the family a crown a week until she eventually died.

After the death of Mary Read's grandmother-in-law, her mother made the now 13-year-old child a foot-boy for an unnamed French lady. Soon after getting the job, Read's mother died. Disillusioned with the job, Read instead joined the crew of an English man-of-war. She later quit and moved into Flanders, where she carried arms in a regiment as a cadet and served bravely but could not receive a commission because promotion in those days was mostly by purchase.

Read moved on to a regiment of cavalry which was allied with Dutch forces against the French. The conflict Read is involved with is vague but implied to be the Nine Years War. Read, in male disguise, proved herself through battle, but fell in love with a Flemish soldier. When they married, she used their military commission and gifts from intrigued brethren-in-arms to acquire an inn named The Three Horseshoes near Breda Castle in the Netherlands. No known inn near Breda was recorded under that name.

Sometime after opening the inn, Read's husband died, and with the end of conflict following the Peace of Ryswick there was no room for advancement, so she left the military and boarded a ship bound for the West Indies. The ship that she boarded happened to be attacked by pirates. Read, while still disguised as a man, chose to join the pirates.

== John Rackham and Piracy ==
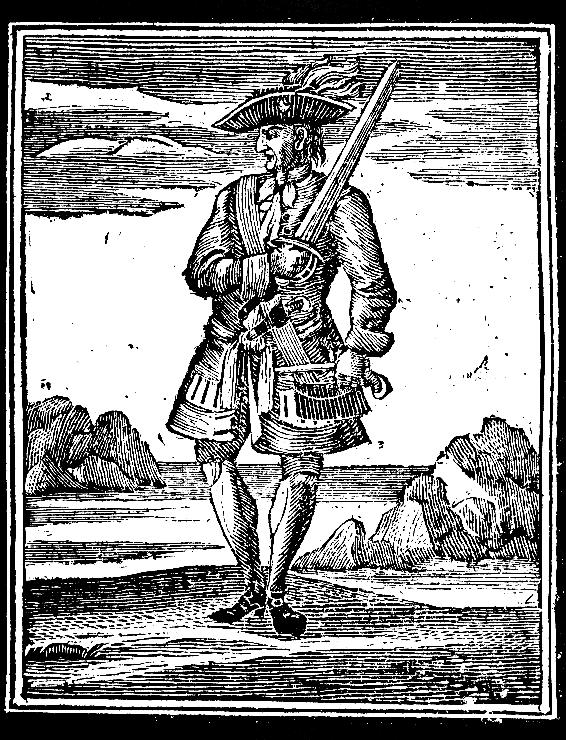
1724 woodcut of John Rackham from A General History of the Pyrates

When Mary Read arrived on the island of New Providence in the Bahamas is unclear, but it was likely before 1720.

While living in the pirates nest of Nassau, Read at some point met John Rackham. The nature of his relationship with her is unclear and ambiguous, and her own trial transcript says nothing on the matter. She was likely well-acquainted with Rackham by the year 1720, after the end of the War of the Quadruple Alliance and two years into the reign of Governor Woodes Rogers.

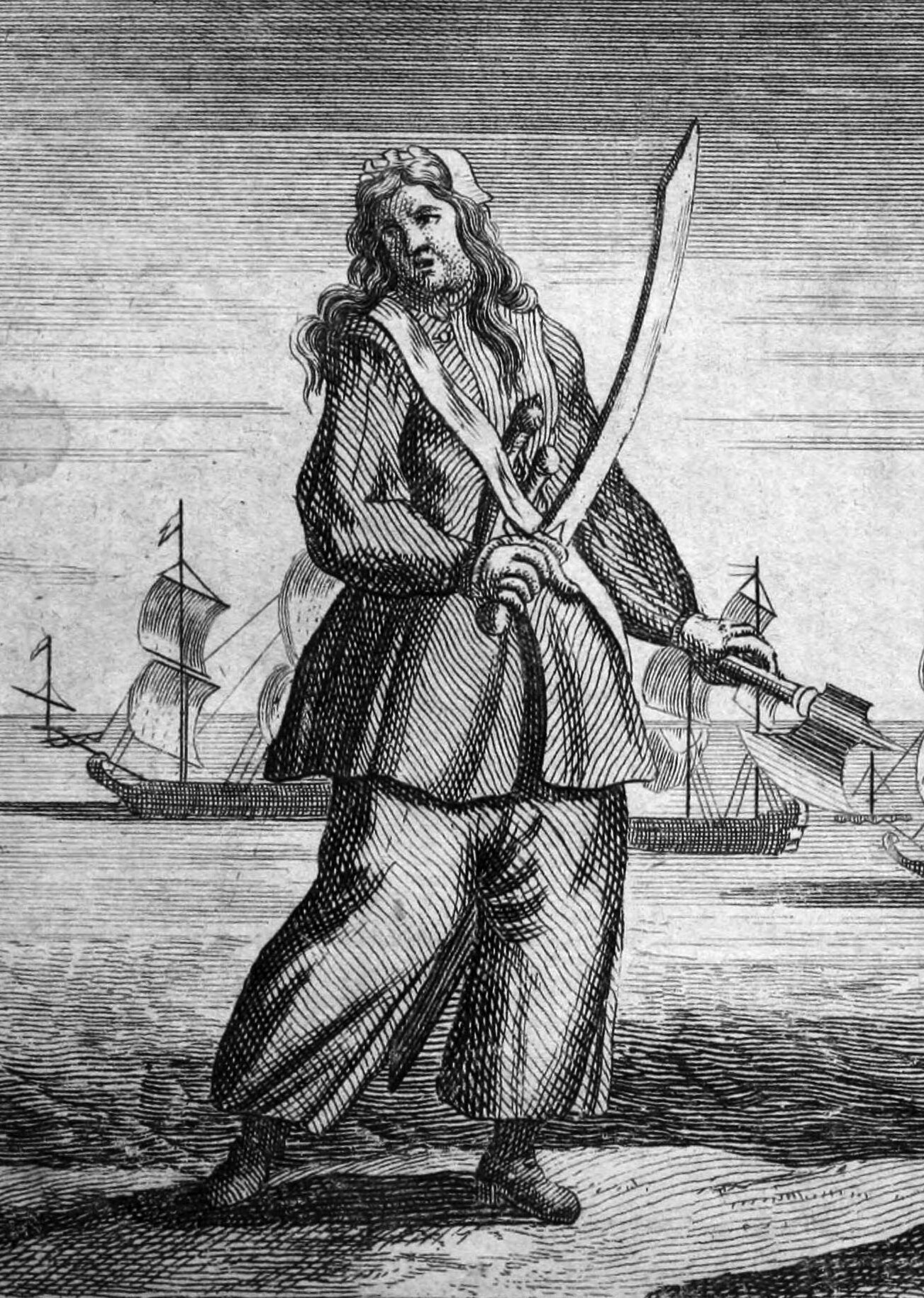
1724 engraving of Bonny from A General History of the Pyrates

On 22 August 1720, Read, Rackham, and another woman, Anne Bonny, together with about a dozen other pirate crewmembers, stole the sloop William from the merchant John Ham, then at anchor in Nassau harbor, and put out to sea. The crew spent months in the West Indies attacking merchant ships. On 5 September 1720, Governor Rogers put out a proclamation, later published in The Boston Gazette, demanding the arrest of Rackham and his associates. Among those named are Mary Read and Anne Bonny.

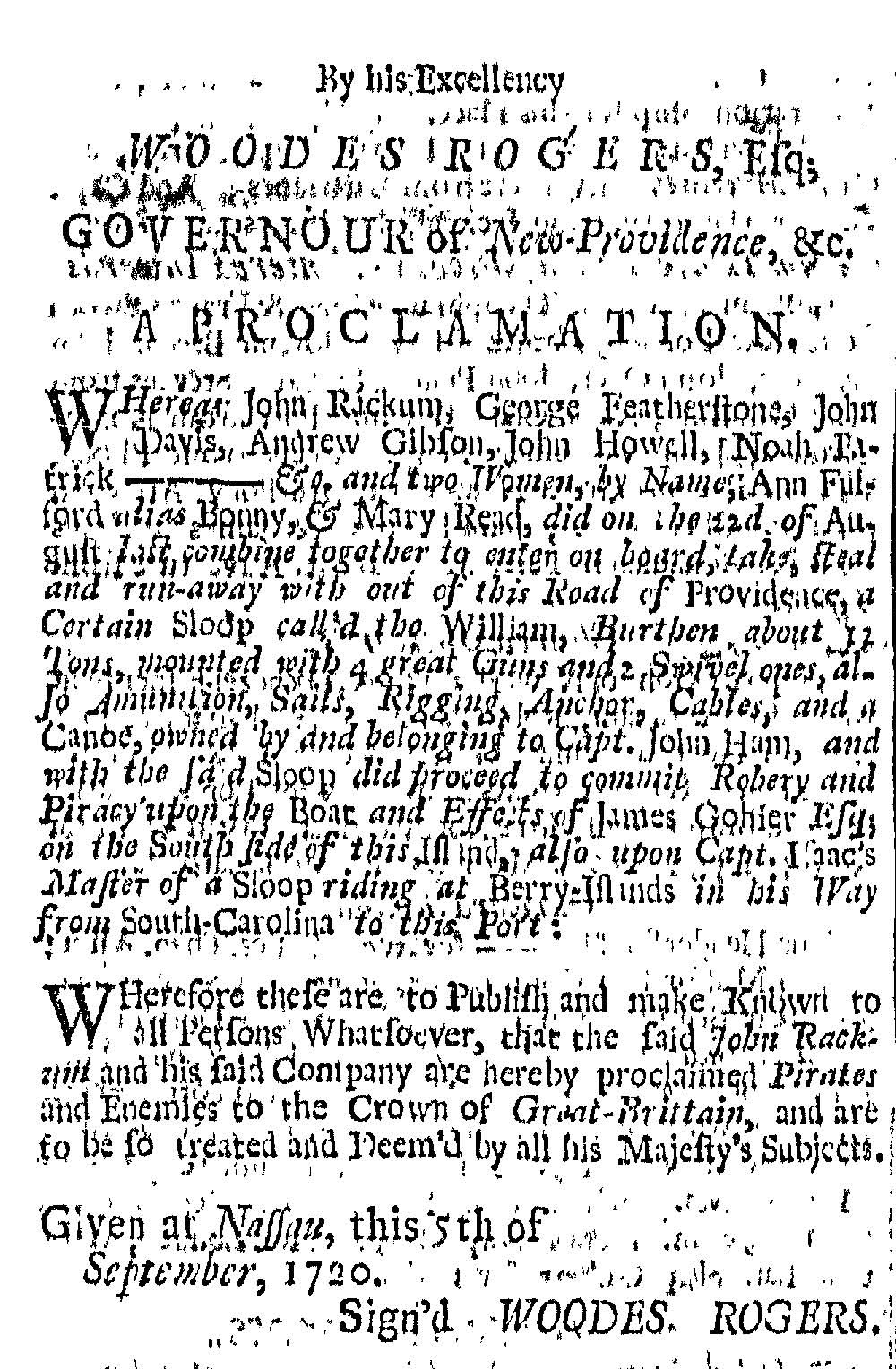
Proclamation issued by governor Rogers 5 September 1720 that mentions Mary Read as a member of Rackham's crew.

A General History claims Bonny eventually fell in love with Mary Read, only to discover she was a woman. To abate the jealousy of Rackham, who suspected romantic involvement between the two, Bonny told him that Read was a woman and swore him to secrecy. This is unlikely, since Rogers' proclamation names both women openly. Later drawings of Read and Bonny would emphasise their femininity, although this too likely did not reflect reality.

A victim of the pirates, Dorothy Thomas of Jamaica, would describe in detail Read and Bonny's appearance during their trial. She said they "wore men's jackets, and long trousers, and handkerchiefs tied about their heads: and ... each of them had a machete and pistol in their hands and they cursed and swore at the men to murder her." Thomas also recorded that she knew that they were women, "from the largeness of their breasts."

== Capture and imprisonment ==
On 22 October 1720, former privateer Captain Jonathan Barnet took Rackham's crew by surprise, while they drank punch with a group of turtlers they had brought aboard near Negril Point off the west coast of the Colony of Jamaica. What followed was a short engagement that ended when the Williams‘ boom was knocked down. Rackham and the crew surrendered immediately after, requesting "quarter". Nobody was killed in the engagement.

Rackham and his crew were arrested and brought to trial in what is now Spanish Town, Jamaica, where they were sentenced to hang for acts of piracy, as were Read and Bonny. However, the women claimed they were both "quick with child" (known as "pleading the belly"), and received temporary stays of execution. Everyone else was executed. In all likelihood, Read was not pregnant and merely lied to extend her life.

== Death ==
Read died while in prison in April 1721. The cause of her death is unknown. Johnson claims she died from a fever. Gaol fever was particularly common among prisoners due to unsanitary conditions. Her interment on 28 April is in the burial records of Saint Catherine Parish. She was likely buried at the cathedral of St. Jago Del La Vega, near the prison. It's impossible to say exactly when Read died, although April 27th or 28th is plausible. There is no record of the burial of her baby, suggesting that she may have died while pregnant, or more likely never had been pregnant.

== Legacy ==
Despite a career of only 61 days, Mary Read is among the most famous pirates in recorded history, primarily due to her gender. Within a decade, Read-inspired characters were already appearing. The first notable inspiration is Polly in John Gay's 1729 ballad opera Polly. Despite already appearing in Gay's previous play The Beggars Opera, her characterization in Polly is blatantly derived from Read and Bonny.

In the 19th century, literature such as Charles Ellms' Pirates Own Book would discuss Read at length, often with illustrations. Throughout much of the 19th and early 20th century, Read dominated literature and the stage. For the Victorian era, Read was far more popular than Bonny.

By the 21st century, Read had fallen in popularity compared to Bonny, who has appeared in hundreds of books, movies, stage shows, TV programs, and video games. Read, by comparison, has gotten very few depictions and when she is depicted, is often secondary compared to Bonny.

=== Speculation of Read's sexuality ===
Since 1725, a number of writers have claimed that Mary Read was the lesbian lover of Anne Bonny. This was never stated in the trial transcript or newspapers, and only begins to appear after much of Bonny's legend was written, and by highly suspect sources.

The first written appearance of this claim is in an unauthorized reproduction of A General History titled, The History and Lives of All the Most Notorious Pirates and Their Crews, released a year after the real A General History. In the passage describing the trial of Bonny and Read, the book briefly says they were lovers. Since A General History is itself unreliable, this claim cannot be trusted. History and Lives would be the only book to claim Bonny and Read were lovers for almost a century. A chapbook knock off of History and Lives would again repeat the claim verbatim in 1813. (Note: The book was titled The Extraordinary Adventures and Daring Exploits of Captain Henry Morgan, but appears to be a 34 page abridged plagiarized version of History and Lives.) Discussion of Read's sexuality would only really begin in the 20th century.

This claim would briefly appear again in 1914, via sexologist Magnus Hirschfeld's book, The Homosexuality of Men and Women. Much like History and Lives, it contains a mere one-sentence claim that Mary Read was a lesbian.

The claim that Bonny and Read were lesbians largely entered popular understanding via the Baltimore born radical feminist Susan Baker's 1972 article, "Anne Bonny & Mary Read: They Killed Pricks" published in a newspaper run by the Washington DC lesbian separatist organization, The Furies Collective. This article would inspire writers such as Steve Gooch, which in turn would influence many media depictions including transgender depictions in the 21st century.

In 2020, a statue of Bonny and Read was unveiled at Execution Dock in Wapping, London. The statues were created in part for the podcast series Hellcats, which centers on a lesbian relationship between Bonny and Read. The statues themselves are abstract depictions of Bonny and Read, claiming that one emotionally completed the other. It was originally planned for the statues to be permanently placed on Burgh Island in south Devon, but these plans were withdrawn after complaints of glamorizing piracy, and because Bonny and Read have no association with the island. The statues were eventually accepted by Lewes F.C. in 2023.

Ultimately, it is impossible to determine if Mary Read was Anne Bonny's lover. Neither woman left any primary sources behind, and sources such as the trial transcript make no mention of their personal lives.

=== In popular culture ===
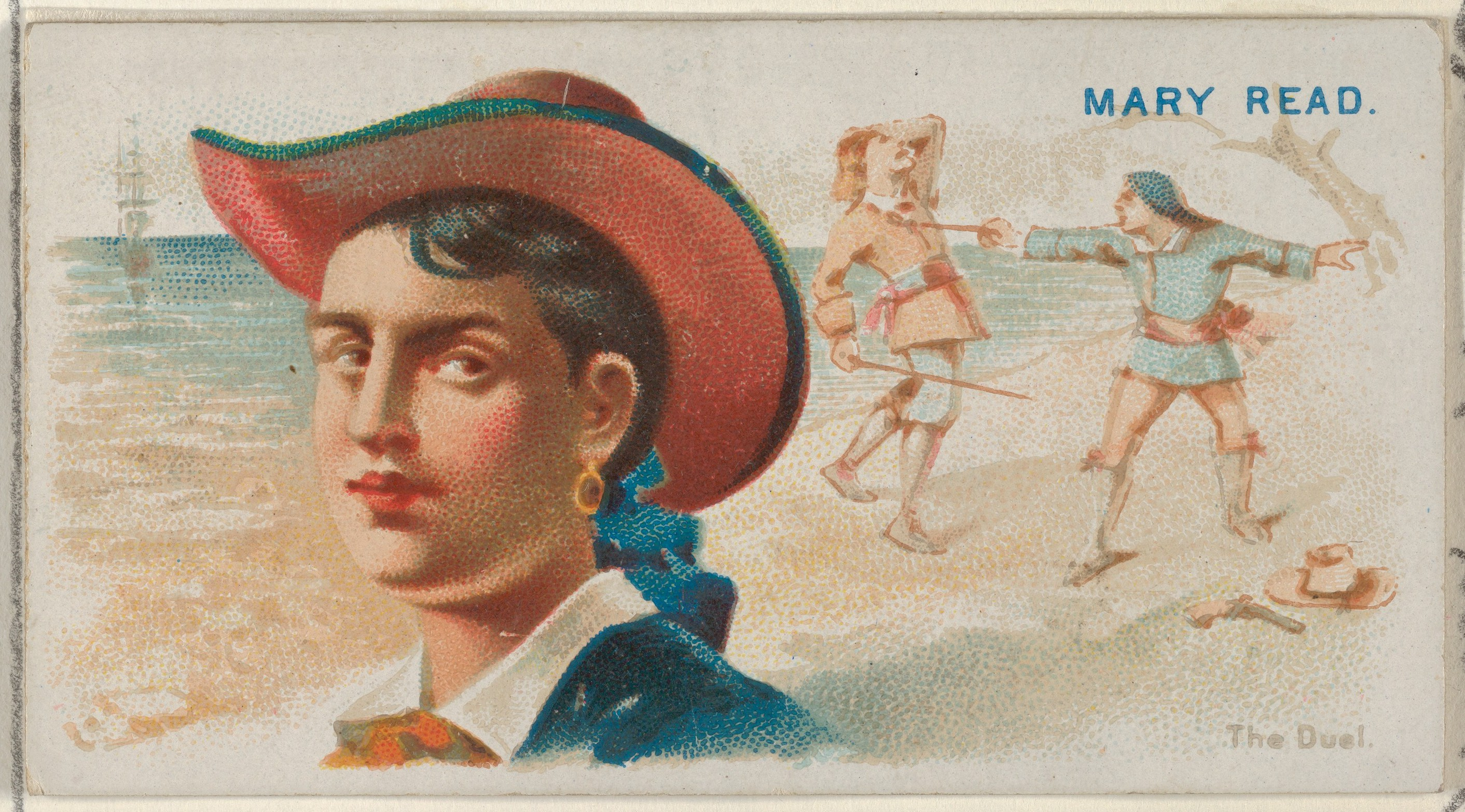
Mary Read, The Duel, from the Pirates of the Spanish Main series (N19) for Allen & Ginter Cigarettes MET DP835033

The following is a non exhaustive list.

- A fictionalized version of Mary Read appears in the 2013 video game Assassin's Creed IV: Black Flag and is voiced by Olivia Morgan.
- The 2006 History Channel documentary True Caribbean Pirates featured Mary Read portrayed by Kimberly Adair.
- The 1961 Italian film Le avventure di Mary Read told the story of Mary Read, portrayed by Lisa Gastoni.
- Read has a cameo in the final episode of Black Sails, played by Cara Roberts.
- Rachel House portrayed Read in the second season of Our Flag Means Death in the episode "Fun and Games".
- Mary Read is the main character of the 2024 fiction book Saltblood by Francesca de Tores.
- Mary Read and Anne Bonny are the main characters in the danish musical “Fang Vinden” from 2026.

== See also ==
- Anne Bonny, Mary Critchett, and Martha Farley, the other confirmed women active in the Golden Age of Piracy
- Grace O'Malley
- Zheng Yi Sao
- Rachel Wall
- Mary Wolverston
