= Captain Charles Johnson =

18th-century literary pen name

- Writing career
- Pen name: Captain Charles Johnson
- Years active: 1724–1736
- Notable work: A General History of the Pyrates

Captain Charles Johnson was the British author of the 1724 book A General History of the Pyrates, whose identity remains a mystery. No record exists of a captain by this name, and "Captain Charles Johnson" is generally considered a pen name for one of London's writer-publishers. Some scholars have suggested that the author was actually Daniel Defoe, but this is widely regarded by historians as incorrect.

A prime source for the biographies of many well known pirates of the era, Johnson gave an almost mythical status to the more colourful characters, and it is likely that the author used considerable artistic licence in their accounts of pirate conversations. First appearing in Charles Rivington's shop in London, the book sold so well that by 1726, an enlarged fourth edition had appeared. English naval historian David Cordingly writes: "It has been said, and there seems no reason to question this, that Captain Johnson created the modern conception of pirates."

== Character of the author ==
Johnson's identity is unknown, but they demonstrate a knowledge of the sailor's speech and life, suggesting that they could have been an actual sea captain. They could also have been a professional writer using a pseudonym who was well versed in the sea. If this is true, the name may have been chosen to reflect playwright Charles Johnson, who had a play called The Successful Pyrate performed in 1712. The play addressed the career of Henry Every, and it had been something of a scandal for seeming to praise a criminal. Following and preceding the book, many biographies and catalogs of criminals were published, including catalogs of highwaymen and prostitutes. This theory suggests that the "Charles Johnson" of the pirate catalog was merely taking part in a burgeoning industry in criminal biography.

== Identity of author ==
The author has remained unknown in spite of numerous attempts by historians to discover his identity. There has been no record found of anyone with the name Charles Johnson serving as a captain in any capacity, save forty-two years before the publication of A General History. Some have suggested that the "Captain" was in fact a common pirate, but again, there is no record of this man.

=== Daniel Defoe ===
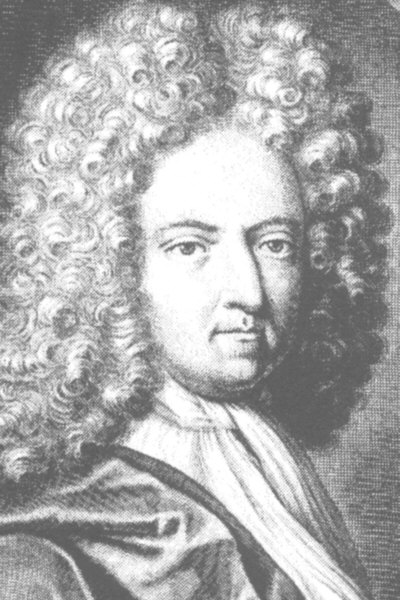
Daniel Defoe 1706

In 1932, literary scholar and writer John Robert Moore posited that Daniel Defoe be acknowledged the author of A General History. After years of research in connection with a collection of Defoe's works, Moore published a study of his findings, detailing his argument for Defoe's authorship of this, and other works. Moore declared that A General History was "substantially" a work of Defoe based on writing style (including frequent meditations on morality similar to in Defoe's work) and content similar to other pieces that have been attributed to Defoe. Moore argued that Defoe's interest in subjects such as "seafaring" and criminals (including pirates) shows that A General History falls squarely into his repertoire. Moore posited that not only could other works be used to confirm that Defoe wrote A General History, but that A General History could be used to endorse his authorship of those same works. Another point that Moore counted on to validate his claims was that many authors, to include historians, had used A General History of the Pyrates as a source of information for their own writings.

Moore's study and his reputation as a Defoe scholar was so convincing that most libraries recataloged A General History under Defoe's name.

==== Criticism ====
However, in 1988, scholars P. N. Furbank and W. R. Owens attacked the theory in The Canonisation of Daniel Defoe, in which they point out that there is no documentary evidence linking Johnson to Defoe, and that there are discrepancies between A General History and Defoe's known works.

Disputes between different Defoe biographers called his body of work into question. Based on the accounts of these many biographers, Defoe's attributed canon went from 101 different works to 570 between the years of 1790 and 1970. Most of these additions were made on the basis of internal, "stylistic" evidence. Moore's publication of his Checklist of the Writings of Daniel Defoe added almost 200 works alone. Many questioned not only his attribution of A General History to Defoe, but the general trend of biographers to continually add to the canon. One critic even suggested, based on this trend, that all anonymous works from the early eighteenth century be designated Defoe's.

Furbank and Owens' arguments against Defoe's authorship of A General History address the parallels that are drawn to other works of the time (often also attributed to Defoe) and the logical fallacies that are necessary to subscribe to such a large, diverse catalog. Many of the ideas and phrases that Moore points to as parallels, and therefore as proof of Defoe's continuity in his works, were commonplace in the eighteenth century. According to Furbank and Owens, Moore's attribution of A General History to Defoe was based on no external evidence and only those few circumstantial parallels. They also cite inconsistencies in the accounts of Henry Every and John Gow.

Author Colin Woodard, in The Republic of Pirates, considers attribution of Johnson's work to Defoe to be erroneous.

=== Nathaniel Mist ===
The author could have been publisher Nathaniel Mist (or somebody working for him). Woodard considers Mist "far more likely" than Defoe, citing Bialuschewski's 2004 paper Daniel Defoe, Nathaniel Mist, and the "General History of the Pyrates". Specifically, Woodard's reasoning includes that Mist was a former sailor familiar with the West Indies, that he was a journalist and a publisher who lived near to and had a working relationship with Charles Rivington (the first publisher of record of A General History), that Mist was the man in whose name the book was registered at Her Majesty's Stationery Office, and Mist's Jacobitism (which perhaps gave him reason to write somewhat sympathetically about some of the pirates, as in A General History).

== Contents of the different editions ==
The original publisher Charles Rivington emphasized the fact that the catalogue included stories of "the remarkable Actions and Adventures of the two Female Pyrates, Mary Read and Anne Bonny" A second edition came out within a few months, vastly enlarged and most likely assembled from writings by other authors. German and Dutch translations were published in 1725. These German- and Dutch-language versions greatly played up the salaciousness of the accounts of "Amazon" pirates.

== Modern editions and related works ==
A General History of the Pyrates continues to be reprinted in many different editions, often with additional commentary, sometimes published under Charles Johnson's name and sometimes under Daniel Defoe's name. Nova Scotian author William Gilkerson published the children's novel Pirates Passage (Trumpeter Books, 2006) which was inspired by the life and work of Charles Johnson, reissued as The Brotherhood of Pirates.

== See also ==
- Captain Alexander Smith

== Notes ==
=== References ===
- Cordingly, David (1997). Under the Black Flag: the Romance and Reality of Life Among the Pirates. Harvest Books. ISBN 0-15-600549-2.
- Druett, Joan (2000). She Captains: Heroines and Hellions of the Sea. New York: Simon and Schuster.
- Furbank, P.N.; Owens, W.R. (1994). Defoe de-attributions : a critique of J.R. Moore's Checklist. London: Hambledon Press. ISBN 1-85285-128-7.
