= Pleading the belly =

Pregnant woman's death sentence reprieve request

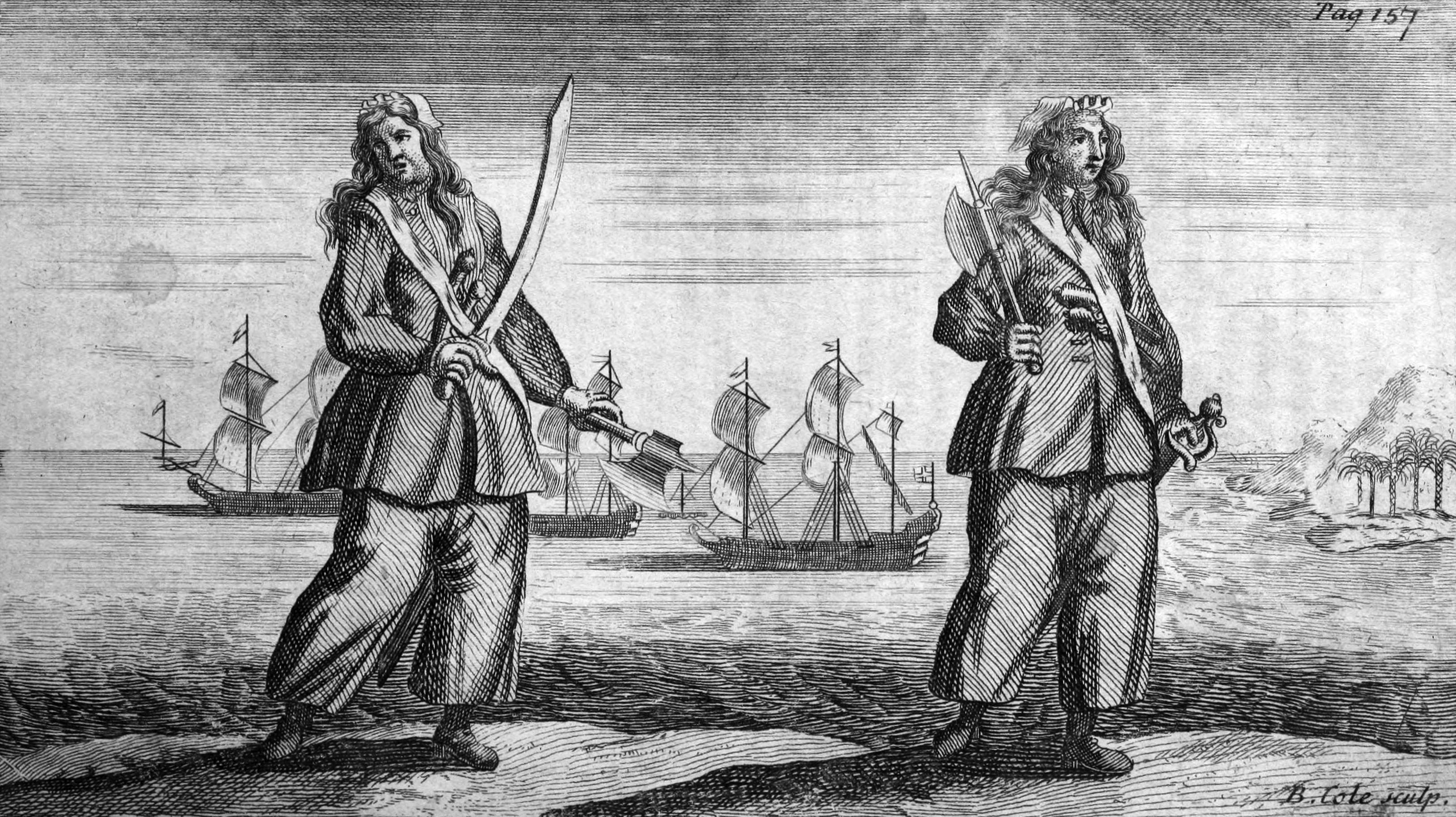
Anne Bonny and Mary Read, pirates who both "pled the belly"

Pleading the belly was a process in English common law which permitted a woman in the later stages of pregnancy to receive a reprieve of her death sentence until after she bore her child. The plea was available at least as early as 1387 and was eventually rendered obsolete by the Sentence of Death (Expectant Mothers) Act 1931, which stated that an expecting mother would automatically have her death sentence commuted to life imprisonment with hard labour. Pleading the belly was also possible in Ireland, Wales and Scotland.

The plea did not constitute a defence and could only be made after a verdict of guilty was delivered. Upon making the plea, the convict was entitled to be examined by a jury of matrons, generally selected from the observers present at the trial. If she was found to be pregnant with a quick child (that is, a foetus sufficiently developed to render its movement detectable), the convict was granted a reprieve of sentence until the next hanging time after her delivery.

Scholarly reviews of the Old Bailey Sessions Papers and Assize records from the reigns of Elizabeth I and James I have shown that women granted such reprieves were often subsequently granted pardons or had their sentences commuted to transportation. Even those women who were subsequently executed pursuant to their original sentences were often executed behind schedule.

The pirates Anne Bonny and Mary Read both used this plea to delay their executions, although it is likely neither were actually pregnant. Read subsequently died in prison, while Bonny was likely let go.

It appears that women were often fraudulently or erroneously found to be quick with child. Daniel Defoe's Moll Flanders includes a character who successfully pleaded her belly despite being "no more with child than the judge that tried [her]".

As a check against this abuse of the system, the law held that no woman could be granted a second reprieve from the original sentence on the ground of subsequent pregnancy, even if the foetus had quickened. In the event that a prisoner became pregnant, her gaoler or the local sheriff was subject to a fine.

In addition, the Murder Act 1751 specified that murderers had to be hanged within 2 days of conviction, reducing the opportunity for female killers to get pregnant.
