= Jury of matrons =

Jury assessing pregnancy in English common law

The jury of matrons was a form of special jury at English common law, usually used to resolve legal disputes over whether or not a party to a legal action was pregnant. The practice also existed in Australia.

== Civil juries ==
The civil jury of matrons was used to determine whether a recently widowed woman was pregnant with what was presumed to be her late husband's child. Such a pregnancy could delay or prevent the late husband's property from passing to his father or brother, who would inherit if he died without male heirs. Civil matrons juries were composed of twelve knights and twelve matrons, summoned by a writ de ventre inspiciendo ("to inspect the belly"). Civil juries of matrons appear to have largely died out by the turn of the 19th century and became obsolete with the Married Women's Property Act 1882.

== Criminal juries ==
Women convicted of capital crimes were permitted to plead that they were "quick with child" (that is, the motions of the foetus could be felt), and to have this claim tested by a group of six women. If the woman was found to be quick with child then she was reprieved by default until the next hanging time, though this could result in further reprieve or commutation (lessening of sentence) depending on the nursing needs of the child and nature of the offence. Criminal juries of matrons were customarily drawn from the women observing the proceedings.

The use of matrons' juries in a criminal context was documented as early as 1387, in language which suggests that it was already a customary procedure. By the sixteenth century, women who successfully pleaded their belly, as the practice was colloquially known, were frequently either pardoned or granted a lesser sentence, such as penal transportation. With the decline of capital offences and the rise of a more sophisticated medical understanding of pregnancy, the practice was increasingly regarded as obsolete, and was generally regarded as archaic and ridiculed in the press on the rare occasions it was employed in the 19th century.

Sentence of Death (Expectant Mothers) Act 1931 (Note: Section 3(1).)
- Act of Parliament
- Parliament of the United Kingdom
- Long title: An Act to prohibit the passing of the sentence of death upon expectant mothers, and for other purposes connected therewith.
- Citation: 21 & 22 Geo. 5. c. 24
- Introduced by: Viscount Sankey; Lord High Chancellor of Great Britain (Lords)
- Territorial extent: England & Wales (Note: Section 3(2).)

Dates
- Royal assent: 8 July 1931
- Commencement: 8 July 1931 (Note: The Acts of Parliament (Commencement) Act 1793.)
- Repealed: 30 September 1998 (Note: The Crime and Disorder Act 1998 (Commencement No. 2 and Transitional Provisions) Order 1998 (SI 1998/2327).)

Other legislation
- Repealed by: Crime and Disorder Act 1998

Status: Repealed

Text of statute as originally enacted

Revised text of statute as amended

Text of the Sentence of Death (Expectant Mothers) Act 1931 as in force today (including any amendments) within the United Kingdom, from legislation.gov.uk.

The jury of matrons was used at least eleven times during the twentieth century, before its abolition in 1931. This amounts to over 10% of all criminal trials during this period in which a woman was sentenced to death. One well-known example was the trial of Ada Annie Williams, who was sentenced to death in December 1914 for the murder of her four-year-old son. She received a reprieve until delivery on account of pregnancy and subsequently had her sentence commuted. The common law was superseded by the abolitionary Sentence of Death (Expectant Mothers) Act 1931, which was rendered redundant (in the case of convictions for murder) in 1965 and in all other cases for all other remaining capital offences (none of which had in fact seen executions since 1965) by the Crime and Disorder Act 1998 which also formally repealed the 1931 Act as unnecessary due to its complete abolition of the death penalty.

== Abuse ==
The practice of drawing of jurors from the observers and lack of a process vetting the jurors' expertise and honesty opened the possibility of stacking the jury pool, leading one eighteenth century commentator to complain that female thieves would have "Matrons of [their] own Profession ready at hand, who, right or wrong, bring their wicked Companions quick with Child to the great Impediment of Justice."

John Gay’s The Beggar's Opera alludes to the idea that women awaiting trial or temporarily reprieved from hanging by virtue of an inaccurate diagnosis of pregnancy would sometimes attempt to conceive by their jailers in hopes of pardon. The context of the allusion suggests that Gay expected theatre-goers to be familiar with the notion.

In what was presumably an attempt to combat the practice, the law held that a woman was not entitled to a second reprieve, regardless of whether she has become pregnant a second time, even if the second fetus has quickened. In such an event, the jailer was subject to a fine for "keeping her so slackly". Scholarly review of the records of the Old Bailey and Assizes suggest that this provision was not strictly enforced.
