= Benerson Little =

American author

Benerson Little is an American author, primarily of non-fiction, focusing on naval history, in particular, piracy and privateering in the 17th to early 18th centuries, including the Golden Age of Piracy in the Caribbean. Little has also established himself as an expert, more broadly, on these and other various types of "sea rovers" over history, including through to the present, and has authored several books related to these subjects. He has also applied his expertise to a variety of artistic and commercial productions, including for the Black Sails (2014–2017) television series, and for the modern board game Blood & Plunder (Firelock Games), serving as a historical consultant for both.

== Early life and education ==
Benerson "Ben" Kile Little was born on July 30, 1959, in Naval Hospital Key West (on the site of the current Naval BHC Key West) in that Florida city, to Alabamians Margaret Little (née Tillery) and Benerson Vernon Little, his father being "a Navy man."

Little grew up "variously on all three US coasts," and studied and graduated from Tulane University.

== Career ==
=== Early career ===
Little joined the U.S. Navy, serving eight years as an officer, 1981–1989, including the six years beginning 1983 as a Navy SEAL (BUD/S Class 121; SEAL Team 3 and SEAL Delivery Vehicle Team 1). After 1989, Little worked in a strategy and tactics group for the related Naval Special Warfare Command, and in the private sector, doing intelligence collection and analysis relating to naval standard and special operations.

=== Published works ===
In the first decades of the new millennium, Little has been doing research and writing, in particular non-fiction, with a focus on naval history relating to piracy, in particularly on "sea rovers"—from early sea raiders, to privateers, letter-of-marque men, and cruisers, to commerce raiders, and pirates and pirate hunters—including during the Golden Age of Piracy in the Caribbean. Little has established himself as an expert on the history of piracy and related subjects, and has authored several books. As of January 2017, he is reported to be devoting time to writing contemporary and historical novels.

==== Books ====
The following are cataloged book-length publications of Little, as of January 2017:

===== Non-fiction =====
- Little, Benerson (2016). The Golden Age of Piracy: The Truth Behind Pirate Myths. New York: Skyhorse Publishing. ISBN 978-1510713048.
- —— (2011). The Sea Rover's Practice: Pirate Tactics and Techniques, 1630-1730. Washington, DC: Potomac Books. ISBN 978-1597973250.
- —— (2010). How History's Greatest Pirates Pillaged, Plundered, and Got Away With It: The Stories, Techniques, and Tactics of the Most Feared Sea Rovers from 1500-1800. Beverly, MA: Fair Winds Press. ISBN 978-1610595001.
- —— (2010). Pirate Hunting: The Fight Against Pirates, Privateers, and Sea Raiders from Antiquity to the Present. Washington, DC: Potomac Books. ISBN 978-1597972918. [Reviewed by U.S. Naval and Army War Colleges.]
- —— (2007). The Buccaneer's Realm: Pirate Life on the Spanish Main, 1674–1688. Washington, DC: Potomac Books. ISBN 978-1597971010.

===== Fiction =====
- Little, Benerson (2015). Fortune's Whelp. Vol. 1 of series by same name. Tucson, AZ: Penmore Press. ISBN 978-1942756606.

==== Selected articles ====
- Little, Benerson (2012). Eyewitness Images of Buccaneers and Their Vessels. Vol. 98. Glasgow: Society for Nautical Research/Taylor & Francis. pp. 312–326. doi:10.1080/00253359.2012.10709007. ISBN 978-1597971010. S2CID 163555946.

=== Consulting ===
Little consults on maritime and naval issues, including "maritime threat and security, and especially maritime history."

He has served as the historical consultant for the Black Sails television series (Starz/Anchor Bay, 2014-), for the first three seasons at least, appearing as well on the nine minute featurette, 'Black Sails': An Inside Look (2014) that was packaged with the Blu-ray disc of the programme's first season. About the Black Sails production, Little has said:

I've seen all the movies and TV series on pirates to date—and although my attitude is perhaps a little colored [biased], I think, frankly, that this is the absolute, most realistic pirate drama to date… [Danish: Jeg har set samtlige film og tv-serier om pirater tip dato—og selvom min holdning måske er lidt farvet, så mener jeg helt ærligt, at det her er det absolut mest realistiske pirat-drama tip dato…]

a statement about which Søren Dalager Ditlevsen of DR Kultur reported:

Morten Tinning, a Dane from the M/S Museet for Søfart [M/S Maritime Museum, of Denmark] in Helsingør, agrees. [Danish: Danske Morten Tinning fra M/S Museet for Søfart i Helsingør er enig.]

Little also served as consultant for the modern board game, Blood & Plunder from Firelock Games, "to ensure that all models, campaigns and strategies reflect the period."

== Appearances ==
Little has appeared in two television documentaries on piracy.

== Critical reception ==
Interest in Little's work has been both scholarly (in both academic and military circles) and popular; notably, Pirate Hunting (2010) was chosen for review by both the Naval and U.S. Army War Colleges.

Jack Gottschalk, a graduate of the Naval War College, an adjunct professor at Seton Hall University, and author of Jolly Roger with an Uzi (2000, with Brian P. Flanagan, on modern piracy), writing for the Naval War College Review with regard to Pirate Hunting, expressed the view that:

[Little] has done a superb job of recounting the violent history that surrounds pirates and raiders and the measures that have been taken to hunt and suppress them. Also, [he] has not forgotten privateers, who, depending on available opportunities, easily switched from being pirate hunters to pirates. Little opens by noting the differences between pirates… and raiders… Additionally, he provides detailed information about pirate and raider ships and about tactics and weapons…

Writing in the National Maritime Historical Society's Sea History, Louis Arthur Norton, professor emeritus at the University of Connecticut, recipient of two Gerald E. Morris Prizes for maritime historiography (2002, 2006), and author of Captains Contentious (2009, on the lives of five Continental Navy captains), describes Little's The Sea Rover’s Practice (2011) as a "scholarly, informative, thought-provoking work," and states, "Considering all the titles that have been published in the last decade on piracy, this book is an excellent resource on its true nature."

As noted, Little's work in providing historical expertise to artistic and commercial efforts on piracy has been seen as imparting high quality to the projects.

== Personal life ==
Little married Virgina Irene Buttram (née Sullivan) on March 8, 1986, at the Chapel at the Naval Air Station North Island, on the north end of the Coronado peninsula in San Diego Bay. The couple had two daughters, born 1991 and 1994.

As of February 2016, Benerson is reported to have been remarried, to Marry Crouch.

Little is described as devoting some of his spare time to research on "historical fencing," and is a fifteen-year teaching veteran of fencing, with thirty-five years in practice and earlier study under Hungarian masters Francis Zold and Eugene Hamori; as of January 2017, he is reported to be a Professional Member of the United States Fencing Association (especially épée, modern classical foil), and is a co-director of and fencing Instructor at the Huntsville Fencing Club.

As of 2010, Little resided in Huntsville, Alabama.
