= David Cordingly =

English naval historian

David Cordingly is an English naval historian with a special interest in pirates. He held the position of Keeper of Pictures and Head of Exhibitions at the National Maritime Museum in Greenwich, England for twelve years.

David Cordingly organised several exhibitions at the National Maritime Museum, including Captain James Cook, Navigator and The Mutiny on the Bounty. One of these exhibitions was Pirates: Fact and Fiction, which became a critical and popular success, followed by a book of the same title, authored by Cordingly and John Falconer. Cordingly explored the subject further in his book Under the Black Flag: The Romance and the Reality of Life Among the Pirates. This was followed by Heroines and Harlots: Women at Sea in the Great Age of Sail (published in the U.S. under the title Women Sailors and Sailors' Women: An Untold Maritime History), expanding on a subject Cordingly had touched upon in Under the Black Flag in a chapter entitled "Women Pirates and Pirates' Women".

In 2002, Cordingly wrote an introduction to the republication of Captain Charles Johnson's 1724 book A General History of the Pyrates.

The Billy Ruffian: His Majesty's Ship Bellerophon and the Downfall of Napoleon, published in 2003, was longlisted for the 2003 Wolfson History Prize. It tells the story of an English warship, HMS Bellerophon, which played an important part in many battles and held captive the defeated Napoleon following the Battle of Waterloo.

Cordingly appears on the Pirates of the Caribbean: The Curse of the Black Pearl DVD bonus features in a section called "Below Deck", a virtual tour of a pirate ship. This consists of several documentary shorts, hosted by Cordingly, comparing piracy fact and fiction along the same lines as Under the Black Flag.

Cordingly resides with his wife and family in Brighton, Sussex.

== Bibliography ==
- (with Falconer, John) Pirates: Fact & Fiction (Collins & Brown, 1992)
- Under the Black Flag: The Romance and Reality of Life Among the Pirates (Random House, 1995)
- Heroines and Harlots: Women at Sea in the Great Age of Sail (Macmillan, 2001)
- The Billy Ruffian: His Majesty's Ship Bellerophon and the Downfall of Napoleon (Bloomsbury, 2003)
- Cordingly, David (2007). Cochrane The Dauntless: The Life and Adventures of Thomas Cochrane, 1775-1860. London: Bloomsbury. ISBN 978-0-7475-8088-1.
- Spanish Gold: Captain Woodes Rogers & the Pirates of the Caribbean (Bloomsbury, 2011)
