= 1717 =

1717 in various calendars
- Gregorian calendar: 1717; MDCCXVII
- Ab urbe condita: 2470
- Armenian calendar: 1166; ԹՎ ՌՃԿԶ
- Assyrian calendar: 6467
- Balinese saka calendar: 1638–1639
- Bengali calendar: 1123–1124
- Berber calendar: 2667
- British Regnal year: 3 Geo. 1 – 4 Geo. 1
- Buddhist calendar: 2261
- Burmese calendar: 1079
- Byzantine calendar: 7225–7226
- Chinese calendar: 丙申年 (Fire Monkey); 4414 or 4207 — to — 丁酉年 (Fire Rooster); 4415 or 4208
- Coptic calendar: 1433–1434
- Discordian calendar: 2883
- Ethiopian calendar: 1709–1710
- Hebrew calendar: 5477–5478
- Hindu calendars
- Vikram Samvat: 1773–1774
- Shaka Samvat: 1638–1639
- Kali Yuga: 4817–4818
- Holocene calendar: 11717
- Igbo calendar: 717–718
- Iranian calendar: 1095–1096
- Islamic calendar: 1129–1130
- Japanese calendar: Kyōhō 2 (享保２年)
- Javanese calendar: 1640–1641
- Julian calendar: Gregorian minus 11 days
- Korean calendar: 4050
- Minguo calendar: 195 before ROC 民前195年
- Nanakshahi calendar: 249
- Thai solar calendar: 2259–2260
- Tibetan calendar: མེ་ཕོ་སྤྲེ་ལོ་ (male Fire-Monkey); 1843 or 1462 or 690 — to — མེ་མོ་བྱ་ལོ་ (female Fire-Bird); 1844 or 1463 or 691

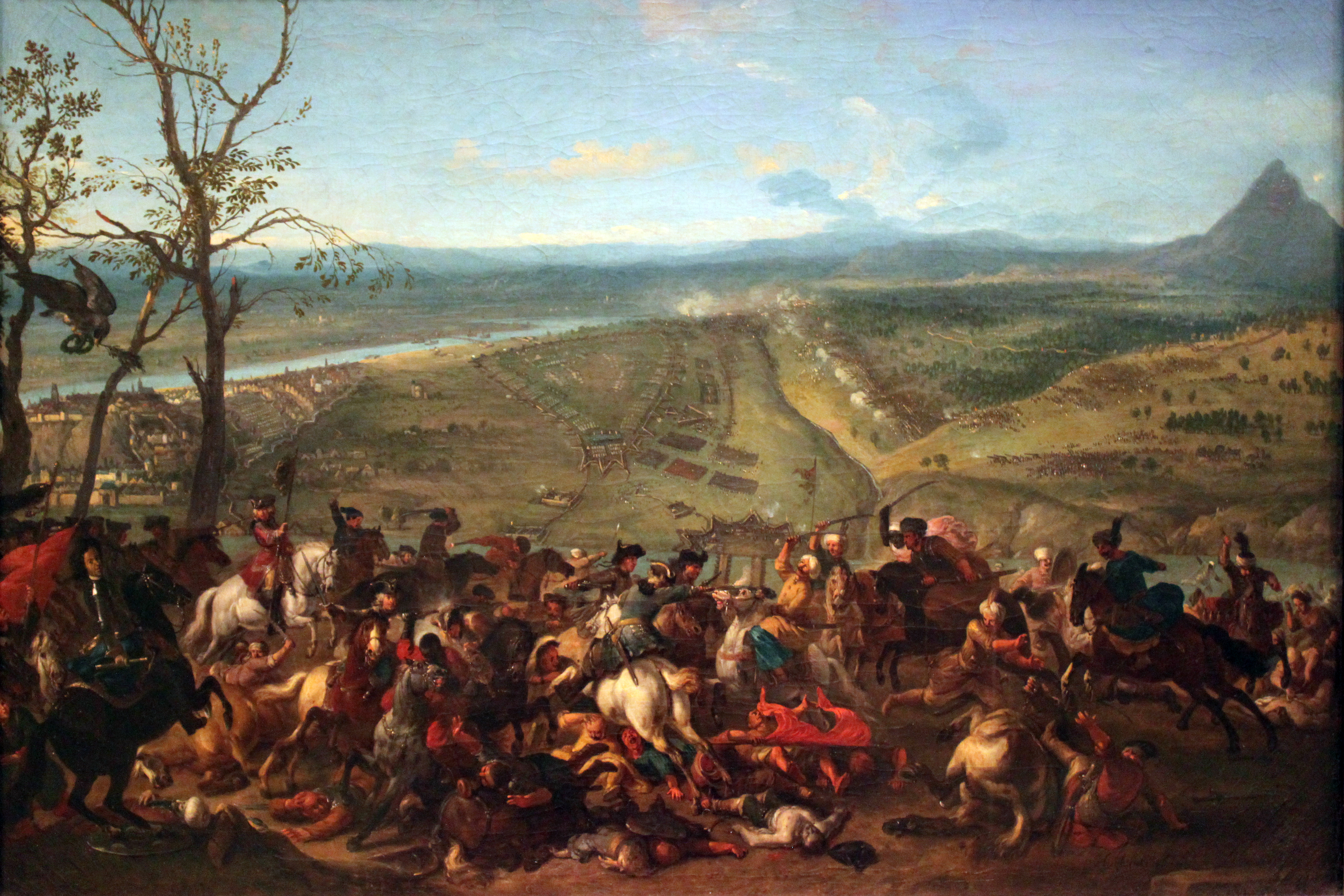
August 17: The Siege of Belgrade ends as Austrian troops capture the city from the Ottoman Empire. (1720 painting by Jan van Huchtenburgh

1717 (MDCCXVII) was a common year starting on Friday of the Gregorian calendar and a common year starting on Tuesday of the Julian calendar, the 1717th year of the Common Era (CE) and Anno Domini (AD) designations, the 717th year of the 2nd millennium, the 17th year of the 18th century, and the 8th year of the 1710s decade. As of the start of 1717, the Gregorian calendar was 11 days ahead of the Julian calendar, which remained in localized use until 1923.

== Events ==
=== January–March ===
- January 1 – Count Carl Gyllenborg, the Swedish ambassador to Great Britain, was arrested in London for a plot to assist the Pretender to the British throne, James Francis Edward Stuart.
- January 4 (December 24, 1716 Old Style) – The kingdoms of Great Britain, France and the Dutch Republic sign the Triple Alliance, in an attempt to maintain the Treaty of Utrecht (1713), Britain having signed a preliminary alliance with France on November 28 (November 17) 1716.
- February 1 – The Silent Sejm, in the Polish–Lithuanian Commonwealth, marks the beginning of the Russian Empire's increasing influence and control over the Commonwealth.
- February 6 – Following the treaty between France and Britain, the Pretender James Stuart leaves France, and seeks refuge with Pope Clement XI.
- February 26–March 6 – What becomes the northeastern United States is paralyzed by a series of blizzards that bury the region.
- March 2 – Dancer John Weaver performs in the first ballet in Britain, shown at the Theatre Royal, Drury Lane, The Loves of Mars and Venus.
- March 31 – Benjamin Hoadly, Bishop of Bangor, brings the Bangorian Controversy within the Church of England into the open by delivering a sermon to, and supposedly at the request of, King George I of Great Britain, on The Nature of the Kingdom of Christ with the text "My kingdom is not of this world" (John 18:36), concluding there is no Biblical justification for church government.

=== April–June ===
- April 26 – The Whydah Gally, flagship of English pirate Samuel Bellamy, is wrecked in a storm off Wellfleet, Massachusetts. The Whydah sinks with a reputed 4 1/2 tons of treasure on board, and all but two of her crew are lost, including Bellamy.
- May 27 – Spain creates the Viceroyalty of New Granada in South America from the northern section of the Viceroyalty of Peru. The viceroyalty, with a capital at Bogotá, later declares independence and splits up into what become the nations of Colombia, Ecuador and Venezuela.
- June 24 – The Premier Grand Lodge of England, the Modern and first Free-Masonic Grand Lodge (which merges with the Ancient Grand Lodge of England in 1813 to form the United Grand Lodge of England), is founded in London.

=== July–September ===
- July 17 – Water Music by George Frederick Handel is first performed, on a Thames barge in London.
- August 17 – The month-long Siege of Belgrade ends, with Prince Eugene of Savoy's Austrian troops capturing the city from the Ottoman Empire.
- August 22 – Spanish troops arrive on the island of Sardinia, at this time a part of the Holy Roman Empire, beginning the conquest of the island, completed by October 30.
- September 5 – King George I of Great Britain issues the "Proclamation for Suppressing of Pirates in the West Indies", an offer of amnesty to pirates, declaring that any pirates who surrender themselves to the government of Britain or one of its overseas territories, on or before September 5, 1718, "shall have Our Gracious Pardon of and for his or their Piracy or Piracies" committed before January 5, 1718. The amnesty is later extended to July 1, 1719.
- September 21 – The first known Druid revival ceremony is held by John Toland at Primrose Hill, in London, at the Autumnal Equinox, to found the Mother Grove, what will later become the Ancient Order of Druids.
- September 29 – Guatemala earthquake: A 7.4 magnitude earthquake strikes Antigua Guatemala, destroying much of the city, and making authorities consider moving the capital of Guatemala to a different location.

=== October–December ===
- October 9 – King Philip V of Spain orders the closure of all universities in Catalonia, including the historic Estudi General de Lleida.
- October 16 – Antonio Vivaldi's opera Tieteberga is performed for the first time, premiering at the Teatro San Moisè in Venice
- October 18 – Trial begins in Boston for six pirates who had survived the April 26 wreck of Samuel Bellamy's ships Whydah and the Mary Anne. Five of them (John Brown, Hendrick Quintor, Thomas Baker, Peter Cornelius Hoof and John Shuan) are convicted on October 22 of piracy and robbery and hanged on November 15.
- October 30 – The Spanish conquest of Sardinia, at this time part of the Holy Roman Empire, is finished two months after Spanish forces had landed on the island on August 22, as the last Sardinian outpost, Castelsardo, surrenders.
- November 28 – Pirates led by Edward "Blackbeard" Teach and Benjamin Hornigold capture the French slave transport Concorde near island of Saint Vincent the West Indies. Blackbeard renames the vessel Queen Anne's Revenge, adds to its armaments, and makes it his flagship. Hornigold soon accepts a British amnesty for all pirates, and Blackbeard teams up with Stede Bonnet and begins plundering ships approaching North American ports.
- December 9 (November 29, O.S.) - King George I of Great Britain banishes his son and daughter-in-law, George, Prince of Wales and Caroline of Ansbach, from the royal household after the Prince threatens the King's personal assistant, the Duke of Newcastle, the royal Lord Chamberlain. The altercation takes place at the baptismal ceremony for the Prince's newborn son, George William.
- December 24–25 – Christmas flood: A disastrous flood hits the North Sea coast, between the Netherlands and Denmark; thousands die or lose their houses.

=== Date unknown ===
- The 1717 Omani invasion of Bahrain removes the control of Persia over the Arabian kingdom of Bahrain.
- François-Marie Arouet is sentenced to imprisonment in the Bastille for eleven months, because of a satirical verse against the Régent of France and his infamous daughter Marie Louise Élisabeth d'Orléans, who is hiding an illegitimate pregnancy and soon to give birth; Arouet will emerge with the pseudonym Voltaire and the completed text of his first play, Œdipe.
- The Tatar invasions in Transylvania devastate many towns, including Cavnic, Sighet and Dej.
- Lady Mary Wortley Montagu, wife of the British ambassador to Istanbul, has her son inoculated.
- The Casa de Contratación (House of Trade) is set up in Cádiz.
- Maharaja Pamheiba of Manipur is converted to Hinduism by Shantidas Goswami, and decrees it to be the official religion of his state.
- Most recent rupture of New Zealand's Alpine Fault, with an earthquake estimated to have had a magnitude between 7.8 and 8.1.
- The Charleville musket enters service in France.
- Thomas Fairchild, a nurseryman at Hoxton in the East End of London, becomes the first person to produce a successful scientific plant hybrid, Dianthus Caryophyllus barbatus, known as Fairchild's Mule.
- Murshid Quli Khan declares himself the first Nawab of the Bengal Subah. The Nawabs of Bengal will effectively function as near-sovereign rulers of Bengal while being nominally loyal to the Mughal Empire.

== Births ==
- January 2 – Edward Seymour, 9th Duke of Somerset, English nobleman, son of Edward Seymour, 8th Duke of Somerset and Mary Webb (d. 1792)
- January 5 – William Barrington, 2nd Viscount Barrington, English statesman (d. 1793)
- January 18 – Jean-François-Marie de Surville, French trader and navigator (d. 1770)
- January 21 – Antonio María de Bucareli y Ursúa, Spanish military officer (d. 1779)
- January 23 – Benjamin Beddome, English Baptist minister and hymnist (d. 1795)
- January 28 – Mustafa III, Ottoman Sultan (d. 1773)
- January 29 – Jeffery Amherst, 1st Baron Amherst, British soldier and conqueror of Quebec (d. 1797)
- February 2 – Ernst Gideon Freiherr von Laudon, Austrian field marshal (d. 1790)
- February 3 – Nicholas Cooke, first Governor of Rhode Island (d. 1782)
- c. February 11 – William Williams Pantycelyn, Welsh hymn-writer, a key leader of the 18th century Methodist revival (d. 1791)
- February 17 – Adam Friedrich Oeser, German etcher (d. 1799)
- February 19 – David Garrick, English actor (d. 1779)
- February 27 – Johann David Michaelis, German biblical scholar and teacher (d. 1791)
- April 6 – Luis de Unzaga, American-Spanish governor (d. 1793)
- April – Pieter Barbiers, Dutch artist (d. 1780)
- April 9 – Georg Matthias Monn, Austrian composer (d. 1750)
- April 10 – Isaac de Pinto, Dutch Jew of Portuguese origin, investor and scholar (d. 1787)
- May 8 – Charles Guillaume Le Normant d'Étiolles, French official, husband of Madame de Pompadour (d. 1799)

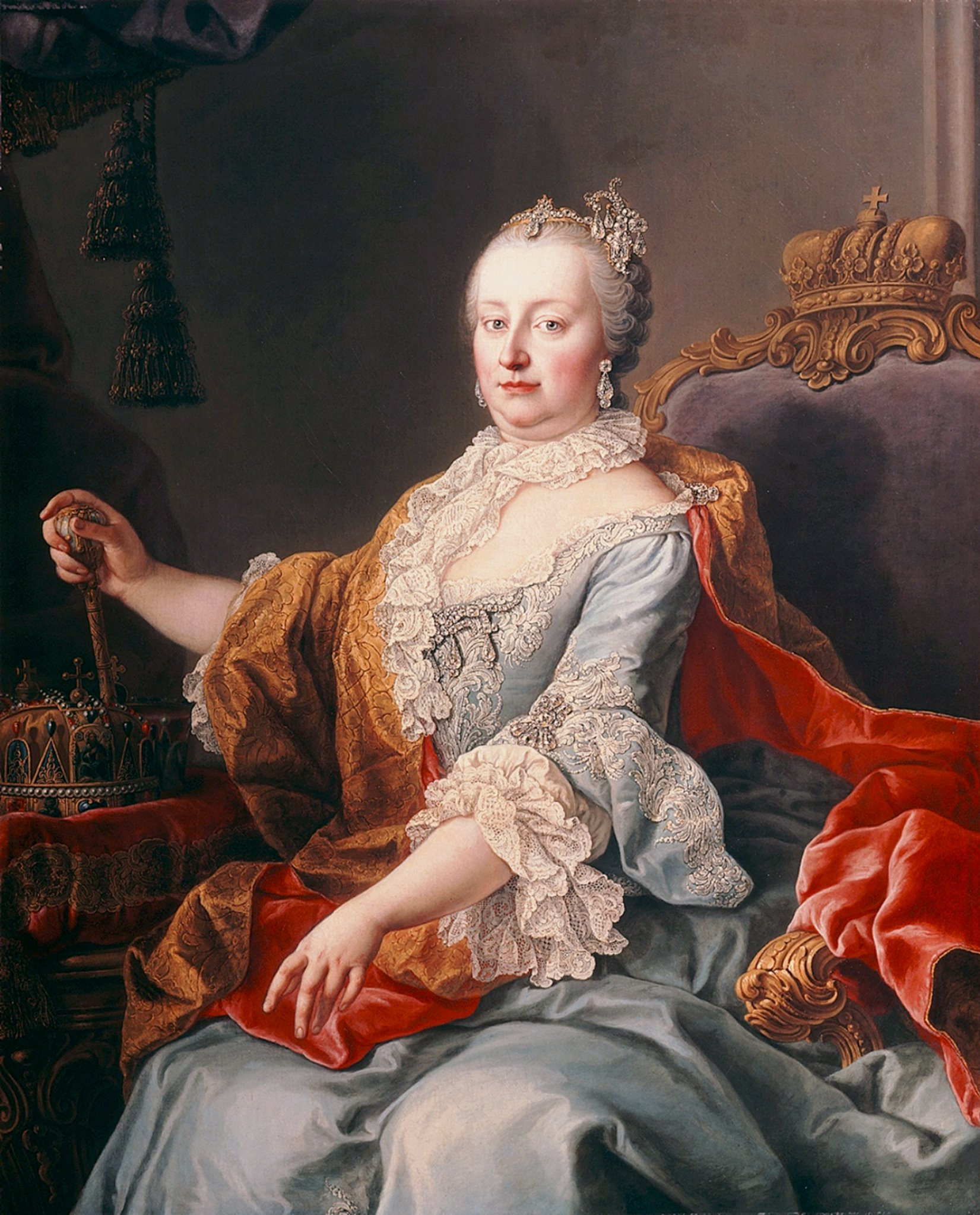
Maria Theresa

- May 13 – Maria Theresa, Archduchess of Austria and Queen of Hungary and Bohemia, consort of the Holy Roman Emperor (d. 1780)
- June 5 – Emanuel Mendes da Costa, English botanist (d. 1791)
- June 8 – John Collins, Continental Congressman, third Governor of Rhode Island (d. 1795)
- June 19 – Johann Stamitz, Czech-born composer (d. 1757)
- June 20 – Jacques Saly, French sculptor (d. 1776)
- June 27 – Louis Guillaume Lemonnier, French botanist (d. 1799)
- June 28 – Matthew Stewart, Scottish mathematician (d. 1785)
- July 5 – Peter III of Portugal, consort of Queen Maria I of Portugal (d. 1786)
- August – Sophie de Lafont, Russian educator (d. 1797)
- August 13 – Louis François, Prince of Conti, French nobleman, military leader (d. 1776)
- August 15
  - Louis Carrogis Carmontelle, French dramatist (d. 1806)
  - John Metcalf, "Blind Jack of Knaresborough", English roadbuilder (d. 1810)
- September 4 – Job Orton, English dissenting minister (d. 1783)
- September 7
  - Agui, Chinese nobleman, general for the Ch'ing dynasty (d. 1797)
  - Martin Dobrizhoffer, Austrian Jesuit missionary (d. 1791)
- September 22 – Pehr Wilhelm Wargentin, Swedish astronomer (d. 1783)
- September 24 – Horace Walpole, English art historian, man of letters, antiquarian and politician (d. 1797)
- September 28 – William Nassau de Zuylestein, 4th Earl of Rochford, British diplomat and statesman (d. 1781)
- October – James Paine, English architect (d. 1789)
- October 5 – Marie-Anne de Mailly-Nesle duchess de Châteauroux, French mistress of King Louis XV (d. 1744)
- October 13 – John Armstrong, American civil engineer, major general in the Revolutionary War (d. 1795)
- October 30 – Jonathan Hornblower, English pioneer of steam power (d. 1780)
- November 13 – Prince George William of Great Britain, member of the British Royal Family (d. 1718)
- November 16 – Jean le Rond d'Alembert, French mathematician and encyclopædist (d. 1783)
- November 17 – Caroline Townshend, 1st Baroness Greenwich, English peeress (d. 1794)
- November 23 – Antoine Guenée, French priest and Christian apologist (d. 1803)
- November 25 – Alexander Sumarokov, Russian poet and playwright (d. 1777)

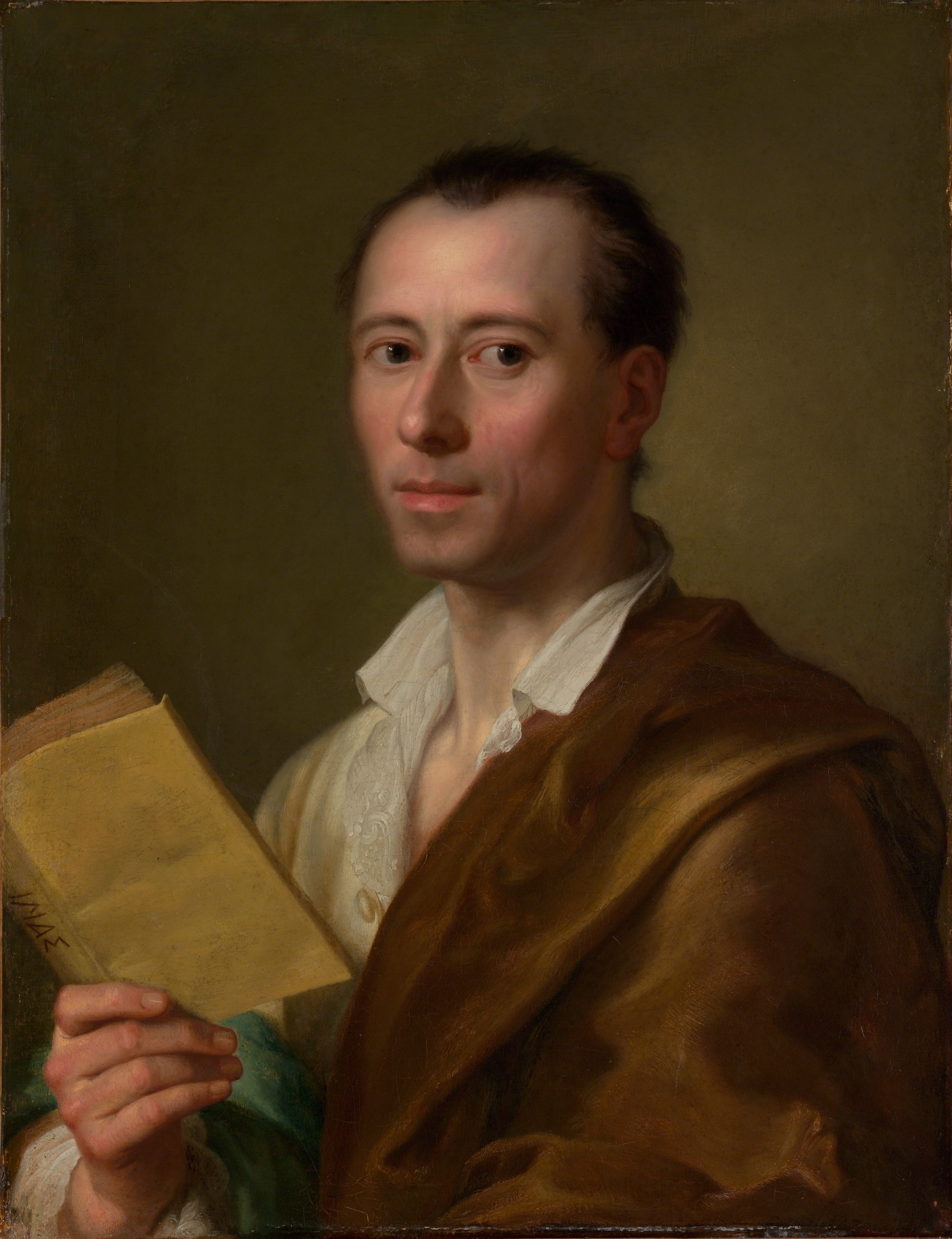
Johann Joachim Winckelmann

- December 9 – Johann Joachim Winckelmann, German classical scholar and archaeologist (d. 1768)
- December 16 – Elizabeth Carter, English writer (d. 1806)
- December 25 – George Augustus Eliott, 1st Baron Heathfield, British army officer (d. 1790)
- December 27 – Pope Pius VI, born Count Giovanni Angelo Braschi, Italian pontiff (d. 1799)
- December 28 – Johann Heinrich Gottlob Justi, leading German Kameralist in the 18th century (d. 1771)
- December 29 – Charles Gravier, comte de Vergennes, French statesman and diplomat (d. 1787)
- date unknown
  - Giambattista Almici, Italian jurist (d. 1793)
  - Claude Humbert Piarron de Chamousset, French philanthropist (d. 1773)
  - Gottlieb Sigmund Gruner, Swiss cartographer and geologist (d. 1778)
  - Elimelech of Lizhensk, Polish Orthodox Jewish rabbi, one of the great founding rebbes of Hasidic Judaism (d. 1787)
  - Henry Middleton, South Carolina plantation owner, second President of the Continental Congress (d. 1784)
  - Lewis Nicola, Irish-born officer in the American army during the American Revolutionary War (d. 1807)
  - Anne Steele ("Theodosia"), English Baptist hymn-writer (d. 1778)
  - Molla Panah Vagif, Azerbaijani poet (d. 1797)

== Deaths ==
- January 6 – Lambert Bos, Dutch scholar and critic (b. 1670)
- January 7 – Empress Xiaohuizhang, second consort of the Qing dynasty Shunzhi Emperor of China (b. 1641)
- January 13 – Maria Sibylla Merian, German-born Swiss naturalist and scientific illustrator, who studied plants and insects and made detailed paintings of them (b. 1647)
- January 30 – John Hartstonge, Irish bishop (b. 1654)

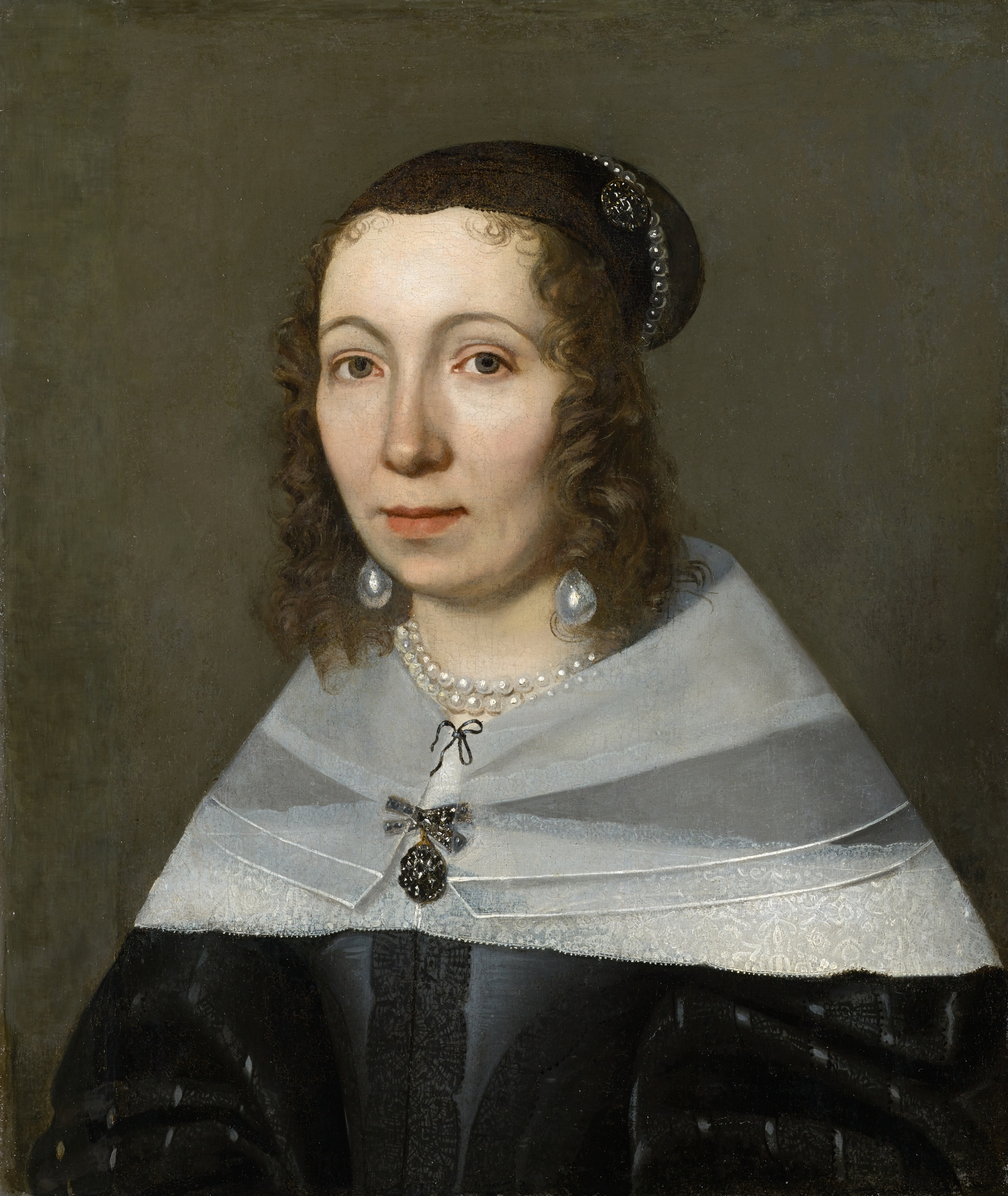
Maria Sibylla Merian

- February 18 – Giovanni Maria Morandi, Italian painter (b. 1622)
- February 21 – Jan Dobrogost Krasiński, Polish nobleman (szlachcic) (b. 1639)
- February 23 – Magnus Stenbock, Swedish military officer (b. 1664)
- March 3 – Pierre Allix, French Protestant clergyman (b. 1641)
- March 5 – François de Callières, French diplomat, member of the Académie française (b. 1645)
- March 8 – Abraham Darby I, English ironmaster, first of that name of three generations of a Quaker family that was key to the development of the Industrial Revolution (b. 1678)
- March 19 – John Campbell, 1st Earl of Breadalbane and Holland, Scottish royalist (b. 1636)
- April 3 – Jacques Ozanam, French mathematician (b. 1640)
- April 5 – Jean Jouvenet, French painter (b. 1647)
- April 11 – Abraham ben Saul Broda, Bohemian Talmudist (b. c. 1640)
- April 26
  - Samuel Bellamy English-born pirate (b. 1689)
  - Christian II, Count Palatine of Zweibrücken-Birkenfeld (b. 1637)
  - John King, pirate (b. c. 1706/9)
- May 10 – John Hathorne, American magistrate (b. 1641)
- May 17 – Bon Boullogne, French painter (b. 1649)
- May 20 – John Trevor, Welsh lawyer and politician, Speaker of the House of Commons of England (b. 1637)
- June 3 – Fernando de Alencastre, 1st Duke of Linares, Spanish nobleman and military officer (b. c. 1641)

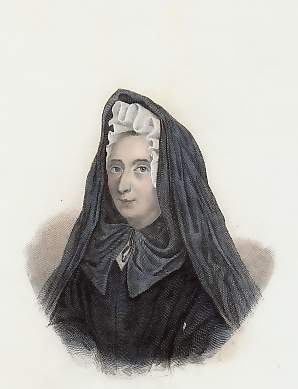
Jeanne Guyon

- June 9 – Jeanne Guyon, French mystic (b. 1648)
- June 11 – Louis de Carrières, French priest and Bible commentator (b. 1662)
- June 15 – Fabrizio Spada, Italian Catholic cardinal (b. 1643)
- June 23 – John Verney, 1st Viscount Fermanagh, British politician (b. 1640)
- July 1 – Princess Anna Sophie of Denmark, daughter of King Frederick III of Denmark (b. 1647)
- July 17 – Juan María de Salvatierra, Milanese Jesuit missionary to the Americas (b. 1648)
- August – William Cochrane, Scottish MP in the Parliament of Great Britain
- August 10 – Nicolaes Witsen, Mayor of Amsterdam, Netherlands (b. 1641)
- August 16 – William Blathwayt, English civil servant and politician (b. 1649)
- August 30 – William Lloyd, English bishop (b. 1627)
- September 17 – Robert Cotton, English politician (born 1644)
- October – Philippe Pastour de Costebelle, French naval officer and Governor of Newfoundland (b. 1661)
- October 22 – Henry Luttrell, Irish army officer, Jacobite commander (b. c. 1655; shot and mortally wounded in his sedan chair in Dublin)
- October 26 – Catherine Sedley, Countess of Dorchester, English mistress of James II of England (b. 1657)
- November 16 – Hester Davenport, English stage actress (b. 1642)
- November 21 – Jean-Baptiste Santerre, French painter (b. 1650)
- November 26 – Daniel Purcell, English composer (b. 1664)
- December 4 – William Hamilton, surgeon in the British East India Company
- December 5 – Richard Onslow, 1st Baron Onslow, English politician (b. 1654)
- December 13 – Nicholas Noyes, Massachusetts colonial minister, during the time of the Salem witch trials (b. 1647)
- December 25 – Robert Shirley, 1st Earl Ferrers, English peer and courtier (b. 1650)
- date unknown
  - William Diaper, English poet of the Augustan era (b. 1685)
  - William Boyd, 3rd Earl of Kilmarnock, Scottish nobleman
  - Niccolao Manucci, Italian writer and traveller in India (b. 1639)
  - Osei Kofi Tutu I, founder of the Ashanti Confederacy (b. c. 1660; killed in action)
  - Wang Hui, Chinese landscape painter (b. 1632)
  - Jane Wiseman, English actress, poet and playwright (b. c. 1682)
