= ZooQuarium =

- Interactive map of ZooQuarium
- 41°39′0.47″N 70°13′29.99″W
- Date opened: 1969; 57 years ago
- Date closed: 2013; 13 years ago
- Location: Yarmouth, Massachusetts, United States
- Land area: 7 acres (2.8 ha)

The ZooQuarium was a small 7-acre (2.8 ha) zoo and aquarium that opened in 1969 on Cape Cod in Yarmouth, Massachusetts, United States. During its operation, it hosted sea lions, seals and other forms of aquatic and land animals. The ZooQuarium formally closed its doors in December 2013.

The property was purchased in 2016 by underwater explorer Barry Clifford for the new Whydah Pirate Museum II which now houses the exhibit previously presented in National Geographic's REAL PIRATES traveling exhibition featuring artifacts and treasures of the Whydah Gally, the only fully authenticated Golden Age pirate ship wreck on earth. It is the sister museum to Clifford's Whydah Pirate Museum already established 40 miles (64 km) north, in Provincetown.
