= Almici =

Almici is an Italian surname. Notable people with the surname include:

- Camillo Almici (1714–1779), priest of the Congregation of the Oratory
- Giambattista Almici (1717–1793), Italian jurist
- Alberto Almici (born 1993), Italian footballer
