= Charles Bellamy =

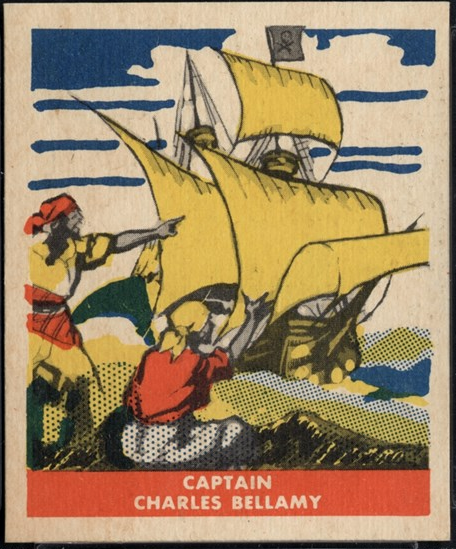
- Charles Bellamy card from the 1948 Leaf Pirate Trading Card set
- Occupation: Pirate
- Years active: 1717-20
- Piratical career
- Base of operations: New England

Charles Bellamy (fl. 1717–1720) was possibly an English pirate who raided colonial American shipping in New England and later off the coast of Canada. He is often confused with (and may actually be) the more well-known Samuel Bellamy.

== History ==
Purportedly, Charles Bellamy raided with a fleet of three ships off the New England and Canadian east coasts in summer 1717, ranging as far north as the Bay of Fundy. Using slave labor he set up an encampment and a small fort (possibly at St. Andrew's), from which he attacked the fishing fleets off Newfoundland and Fortune Bay. Thinking he'd found a large merchant vessel in the Gulf of St. Lawrence, he accidentally engaged a French 36-gun warship which heavily damaged his ship and forced him to flee after a three-hour battle. Escaping at night under cover of a storm, he left to set up a new camp, either at Placentia or Oderin. After some years ashore he disappeared with his remaining loot.

== Confusion with Samuel Bellamy ==
It is possible that Charles Bellamy never existed. There are no contemporary records of him. The mention of a pirate named Charles Bellamy occurs first in Philip Gosse's book The Pirate's Who's Who, which was printed over 200 years after the Golden Age of Piracy. Gosse describes Charles Bellamy but he does not mention the more known Samuel Bellamy. He does mention Charles Bellamy's ship "Whidaw", which was also Samuel Bellamy's famous ship, the Whydah Gally. Samuel Bellamy's ship sunk off the coast of Cape Cod in April 1717, and the wreck has been discovered. Gosse mentions the Mary Anne as a ship in Charles Bellamy's fleet, which happened to be also a ship in the fleet of Samuel Bellamy.

"At the time he was in command of the Whidaw and a small fleet of other pirate craft, which was laying at anchor in the bay of Placentia in Newfoundland. Sailing from Newfoundland for Nantucket, he seized the a whaling-vessel, the Mary Anne."

It seems plausible that Gosse confused Charles Bellamy with Samuel Bellamy, and later sources simply kept citing Gosse. It is commonly believed that Samuel Bellamy died in the wreck of the Whydah Gally in 1717.

Samuel Bellamy was active from 1716 to 1717 and engaged in piracy in the Caribbean and as far north as Cape Cod. Captain Charles Johnson's 1724 “General History of the Pyrates” contains a lengthy section on “Capt. Bellamy” including several speeches supposedly delivered to captured merchant captains. The speeches and monologues - extolling pirate freedoms and haranguing the captains for serving greedy masters - are generally thought to be Johnson's literary inventions. They were attributed by later writers to Charles Bellamy, along with the shipwreck which claimed Samuel Bellamy's life, and caused Philip Gosse to describe Charles Bellamy as “BELLAMY, Captain Charles. Pirate, Socialist, and orator. A famous West Indian filibuster.” An example of the speeches attributed by Johnson to “Bellamy,” and by others to Charles Bellamy:

"I am sorry," he said, "that you can't have your sloop again, for I scorn to do anyone any mischief—when it is not to my advantage—though you are a sneaking puppy, and so are all those who will submit to be governed by laws which rich men have made for their own security, for the cowardly whelps have not the courage otherwise to defend what they get by their knavery. But damn ye altogether for a pack of crafty rascals, and you, who serve them, for a parcel of hen-hearted numbskulls! They vilify us, the scoundrels do, when there is the only difference that they rob the poor under cover of the law, forsooth, and we plunder the rich under the protection of our own courage. Had you not better make one of us than sneak after these villains for employment?"

== See also ==
- Stede Bonnet – another pirate captain whose deeds were conflated with Bellamy's by “Captain Charles Johnson”.
