= Guenée =

Guenée is a French surname. Notable people with the surname include:

- Achille Guenée (1809–1880), French lawyer and entomologist
- Antoine Guenée (1717–1803), French priest and Christian apologist
