= John King (pirate) =

Pirate (c.1706/09–1717)

- Born: ca. 1706/09
- Died: April 26, 1717; Cape Cod, Massachusetts
- Piratical career
- Type: Pirate
- Years active: November 9, 1716 - April 26, 1717
- Base of operations: Caribbean Sea

John King (c. 1706/09 – April 26, 1717) was an 18th-century pirate. He joined the crew of Samuel Bellamy while still a juvenile, and may have been the youngest known pirate on record.

On November 9, 1716, Bellamy and his crew, sailing the sloop Mary Anne (or Marianne), attacked and captured the Antiguan sloop Bonetta, which was then en route from Jamaica to Antigua." John King, then aged between eight and eleven, was a passenger on the Bonetta. According to Abijah Savage, the Bonetta's commander, the pirates looted the ship for 15 days, during which time King demanded to join Bellamy's crew. "(F)ar from being forced or compelled (to join)," Savage wrote in his report, "he declared he would kill himself if he was restrained, and even threatened his mother, who was also on board as a passenger."

While teenage pirates were common in the 18th century, and though the Royal Navy employed young boys as "powder monkeys" to carry gunpowder from ship's magazine to their cannons, boys of King's age were unknown as pirates. However, after an initial show of defiance, Bellamy allowed King to join him. In the subsequent months, Bellamy and his crew would capture and loot many ships, including the Whydah in February 1717, a heavily armed slave galley which Bellamy claimed for his flagship. On April 26, 1717, the Whydah was wrecked in a storm off the coast of Cape Cod, killing Bellamy and most of his crew, including King.

King's remains were tentatively identified in 2006, when Barry Clifford, principal of Expedition Whydah Sea Lab & Learning Center in Provincetown, Massachusetts, and Project Historian Ken Kinkor had partial human remains recovered from the wreck analyzed by researchers at the Smithsonian Institution and Center for Historical Archaeology in Florida. The remains, consisting of an 11-inch fibula encased in a shoe and silk stocking, were determined not to belong to a small man, as originally thought, but to a young boy of King's approximate age.

== See also ==
- Nicolas Brigaut - French buccaneer executed by the Spanish in 1686 in Florida. He was captured with a black sailor named Diego and a nine-year-old boy, who may have been younger than King.

== Sources ==
- Michael Levinson, "Remains are identified as boy pirate" Boston Globe, June 2, 2006
- Thomas H. Maugh II, "Whydah's littlest pirate found" Baltimore Sun, June 1, 2006
- The Strange and Brief Life of a Young Pirate National Public Radio
- Nelson, Laura "John King - The Boy Pirate" in Pirates and Privateers Pirates & Privateers: John King -- The Boy Pirate
