= Old Jail (Barnstable, Massachusetts) =

- U.S. National Register of Historic Places
- U.S. Historic district – Contributing property
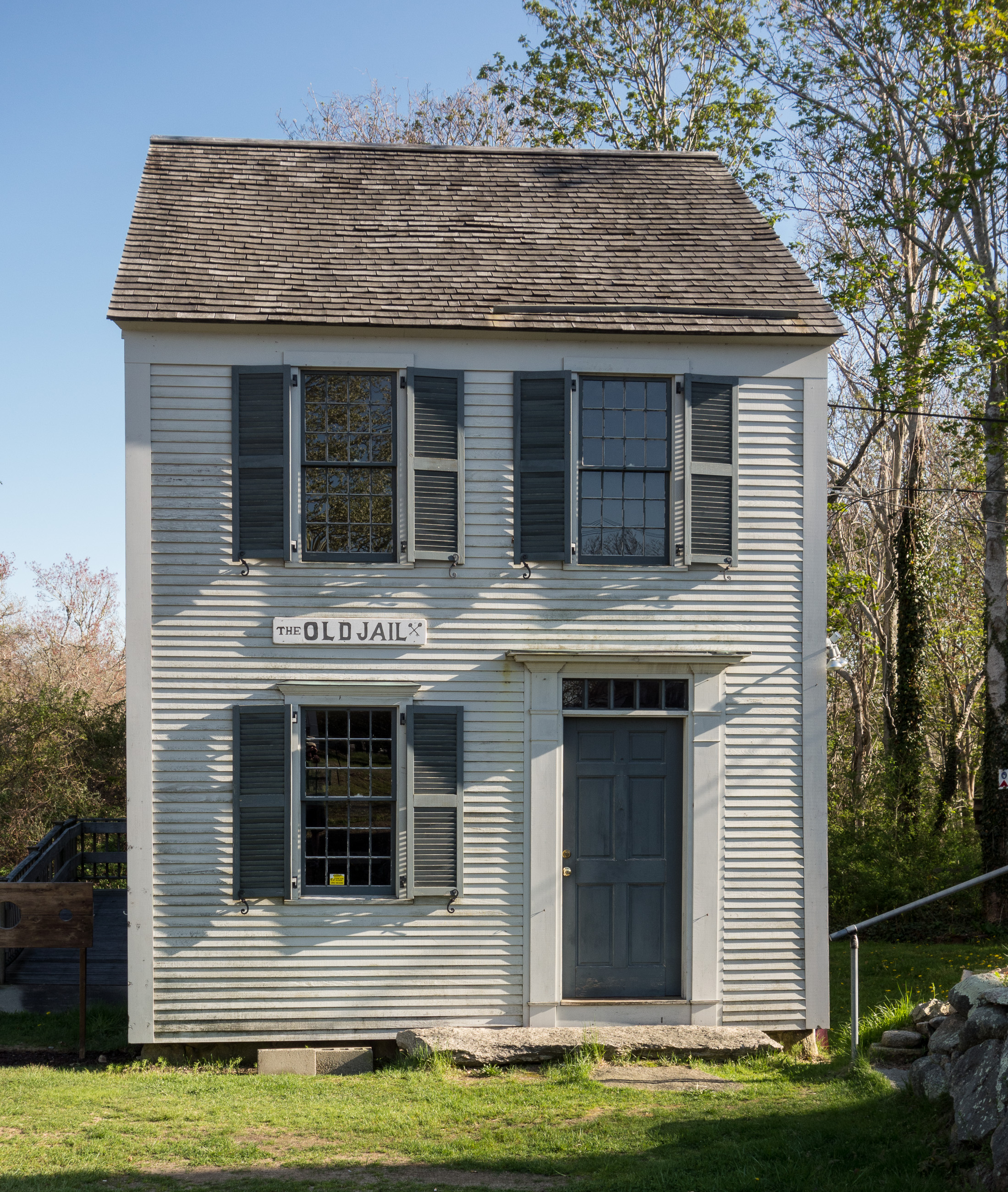
- Old Jail in 2014

- Location within Cape Cod Location within Massachusetts Location within the United States
- Location: 3365 Main Street, Barnstable, Massachusetts
- Coordinates: 41°42′0″N 70°17′56″W
- Built: 1690
- Architectural style: Colonial
- Part of: Old King's Highway Historic District (ID87000314)
- NRHP reference No.: 71000078

Significant dates
- Added to NRHP: July 2, 1971
- Designated CP: March 12, 1987

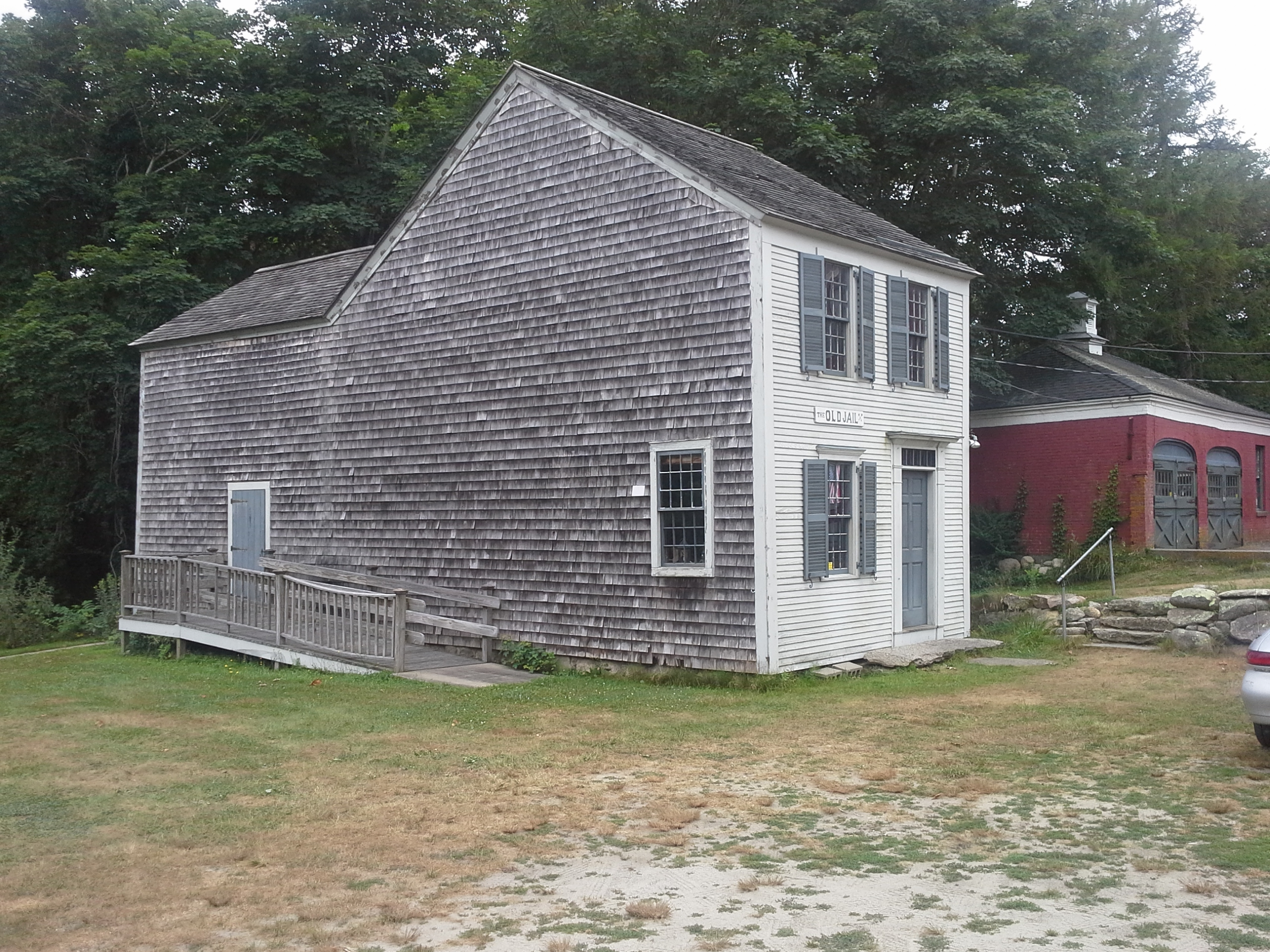
Oldest wooden jail in America in Barnstable

Barnstable's Old Gaol is a historic colonial jail in Barnstable, Massachusetts. Built c.1690, it is the oldest wooden jail in the United States of America.

The jail was built by order of the Plymouth and Massachusetts Bay Colony courts. It served as the Barnstable County jail until c.1820, when a new stone jail was built. The structure, which held about six prisoners, was eventually attached to a barn. In 1968 it was rediscovered, separated from the barn, and moved 100 feet (30 m) onto the grounds of the Coast Guard Heritage Museum (located in the old Customshouse building) in Barnstable Village.

The building was listed on the National Register of Historic Places in 1971, and included in the Old King's Highway Historic District in 1987.

In 1716, the jail imprisoned Goody Hallett, the lover of pirate Samuel Bellamy, later known as the Witch of Wellfleet, as well as the two survivors of Sam Bellamy's flagship Whydah Gally which wrecked at Wellfleet, and the seven survivors of his consort ship Mary Anne which wrecked ten miles (16 km) south at Pochet Island. The jail house is considered one of the most haunted in America and is open to ghost tours at certain times of the year. It is believed to be haunted by Goody Hallett, who is said to also haunt the Expedition Whydah in Provincetown (now in West Yarmouth), as well as Lucifer Land (also called Goody Hallett's Meadow) which is a reference to the area of land at the top of the Wellfleet cliffs.

== See also ==
- National Register of Historic Places listings in Barnstable County, Massachusetts
