= John Julian =

American Indian pirate

- Born: c.1701 likely Mosquitia
- Died: March 22, 1733 (aged 31–32); Boston, Massachusetts
- Piratical career
- Type: Pirate
- Allegiance: Samuel Bellamy
- Years active: 1716 – April 26, 1717
- Rank: pilot of the Whydah Gally

John Julian (c. 1701—March 26, 1733) was a pirate of multi-racial descent who operated in the Americas, as the pilot of the ship Whydah.

Julian joined pirate Samuel Bellamy, and became the pilot of Bellamy's Whydah when he was probably only 16 years of age.

In 1717, the Whydah shipwrecked, with Julian and a carpenter called Thomas Davis being the only known survivors. He was captured, but not indicted, so he was probably sold as a slave. He may have been the "Julian the Indian" bought by John Quincy, great-grandfather of president John Quincy Adams.

"Julian the Indian" reportedly made multiple attempts to flee and once killed a bounty hunter who was after him. He was executed in March 1733.

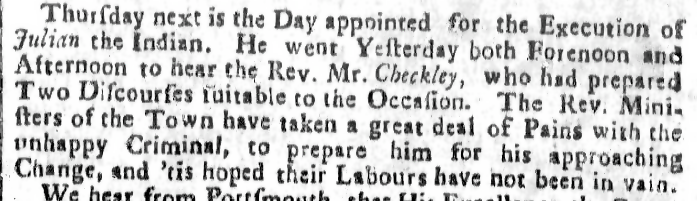
Newspaper item about execution of "Julian the Indian" (The Weekly Rehearsal, Boston, March 1733)
