= Lawrence Prince =

Dutch pirate

- Born: c. 1630; Amsterdam, Netherlands
- Died: 1680s
- Piratical career
- Type: Buccaneer, privateer, slave trader
- Allegiance: England
- Years active: c. 1659–1671
- Rank: Lieutenant-Colonel
- Base of operations: Caribbean
- Battles: Raid on Granada (1670); Sack of Panama (1671)

Laurens Prins, anglicized as Lawrence Prince, (c. 1630s, Amsterdam – before 1688) was a 17th-century Dutch buccaneer, privateer and an officer under Captain Sir Henry Morgan. He and Major John Morris led one of the columns that raided Panama in 1671.

== Biography ==
According to Spanish accounts, Lawrence Prince was a Dutchman from Amsterdam who arrived in the Caribbean in the late 1650s. In 1659, he was one of four men, including John Morris and Robert Searle, who bought a captured Spanish prize from Commodore Christopher Myngs following his ten-week voyage. Prior to joining Morgan's forces at Port Royal in November 1670, he had previously sailed up to Rio Magdalena intending to raid the town of Mompos located 240 kilometres (150 mi) inland. Prince was forced to retreat, however, when they were surprised by cannon fire from a recently built island fort protecting the settlement. Prince and his men, determined to "make voyage", sailed north to Nicaragua in August. As in Colombia, Prince sailed up the San Juan River, captured a Spanish fort and paddled by canoe to Lake Nicaragua where they successfully raided Granada. This was almost identical to Morgan's raid in 1664. Official Spanish reports of the incident claimed that Prince "made havoc and a thousand destructions, sending the head of a priest in a basket and demanding 70,000 pesos in ransom."

Arriving in Port Royal weeks later, he and two other captains were reproved by Governor Thomas Modyford for attacking the Spanish without a commission or letter of marque. Modyford thought it prudent not "to press the matter too far in this juncture" and ordered them to join Morgan on his raid against Panama, "which they were very ready to do". Impressed by his raid at Granada, Morgan appointed Prince third in command under himself and Captain Edward Collier. He and Major John Morris later led the vanguard, numbering 300 buccaneers, against the Spanish fortress on the morning of January 28, 1671. Prince supported the main force, around 600 men, with Morgan and Collier leading the right and left wings, while the rearguard was commanded by Colonel Bledry Morgan.

In the final advance, he and Morris commanded the left flank. Advancing in a wide sweep around the Spanish right flank, they captured a hill overlooking the Spanish lines. This not only forced the Spanish defenders into committing to an attack, it also disrupted plans by their commander, Juan Perez de Guzman, to stampede a herd of cattle and other livestock towards the advancing buccaneers. He had kept them behind his infantry line, intending to allow the buccaneers to pass through his lines, and setting them against the attackers to presumably disrupt and disorganize them just before the Spanish foot made contact with the buccaneering force. Instead, the Spanish cattle drovers were scared away by Prince's attack, allowing the cattle to wander among the Spanish lines. A simultaneous assault on the hill and against Morgan's advancing buccaneers ended in disaster as concentrated volley fire decimated Spanish forces, which suffered 100 casualties in the first volley alone. The wandering cattle and concentrated fire, left between 400 and 500 dead and wounded before the Spanish finally retreated from the field.

He was later appointed a lieutenant by Modyford's successor, Sir Thomas Lynch, who replaced Captain John Wilgress, commander of HMS Assistance, with Major William Beeston. Lynch may have intended to initiate the restructuring of colonial administration, surrounding himself with known associates rather than appointed officials of the British crown. By 1672, using his share from the Panama raid, Prince became a wealthy landowner on the Liguanea plain on his Lawrencefield Estate as it was opened up for cultivation and farming. He died in the mid 1680s, shortly before Henry Morgan purchased the Estate.

Prince is commonly mistaken for the English slave trader Lawrence Prince, who captained ships for independent slave traders during the decline of the Royal African Company in the early 18th century. That Lawrence Prince gained notoriety as the ill-fated captain of the Whydah, which was captured by the pirate Samuel Bellamy in 1717.

== In popular culture ==
Laurens Prins is featured as a minor antagonist and assassination target in the video game Assassin's Creed IV: Black Flag, in which he is portrayed as a Dutch slave trader residing in Kingston. He is targeted by the protagonist Edward Kenway because he employed Bartholomew Roberts, who possesses information that both Kenway and the Templars seek. After learning about this, Prins attempts to sell Roberts to the Templars, but is killed by Kenway in his mansion's garden house before he can do so. Before dying, Prins compares himself with Kenway because they both sought wealth and neither believe in a greater cause than freedom, but Prins uses his belief to justify his status as a slave trader.
