= Camillo Almici =

Italian Catholic priest

Camillo Almici (2 November 1714 – 30 December 1779) was a Catholic priest and academic of the Congregation of the Oratory.

== Biography ==
Almici was born at Brescia, of a noble family. He became a member of the Congregation of the Oratory at a very early age, and devoted himself to the study of theology, Greek, and Hebrew, the Bible, chronology, religious and secular history, antiquities, criticism, diplomacy, and liturgy. He gained a strong reputation among his contemporaries for his scholarship.

He has left critical reflections on the work of Febronius's De Statu Ecclesiae (1763), together with some treatises, part of which are still in manuscript. His Méditations sur la vie et les écrits du P. Sarpi is a critical examination of Paolo Sarpi's partisan history of the Council of Trent.

He wrote under multiple pseudonyms, including Callimaco Limi, Callimaco Mili, and N. N.

His brother Giambattista Almici was a celebrated Italian jurist.

== Works ==
Of the many works he wrote, the principal are the following:

- Riflessioni sù di un libro di G. Febronio (1766)
- Critica contro le opere del pericoloso Voltaire (1770)
- Dissertazione spora i Martiri della Chiesa cattolica (1765, 2 vols.)
- Méditations sur la vie et les écrits du P. Sarpi (1765)
