= Isaac de Pinto =

Dutch merchant and banker (1717–1787)

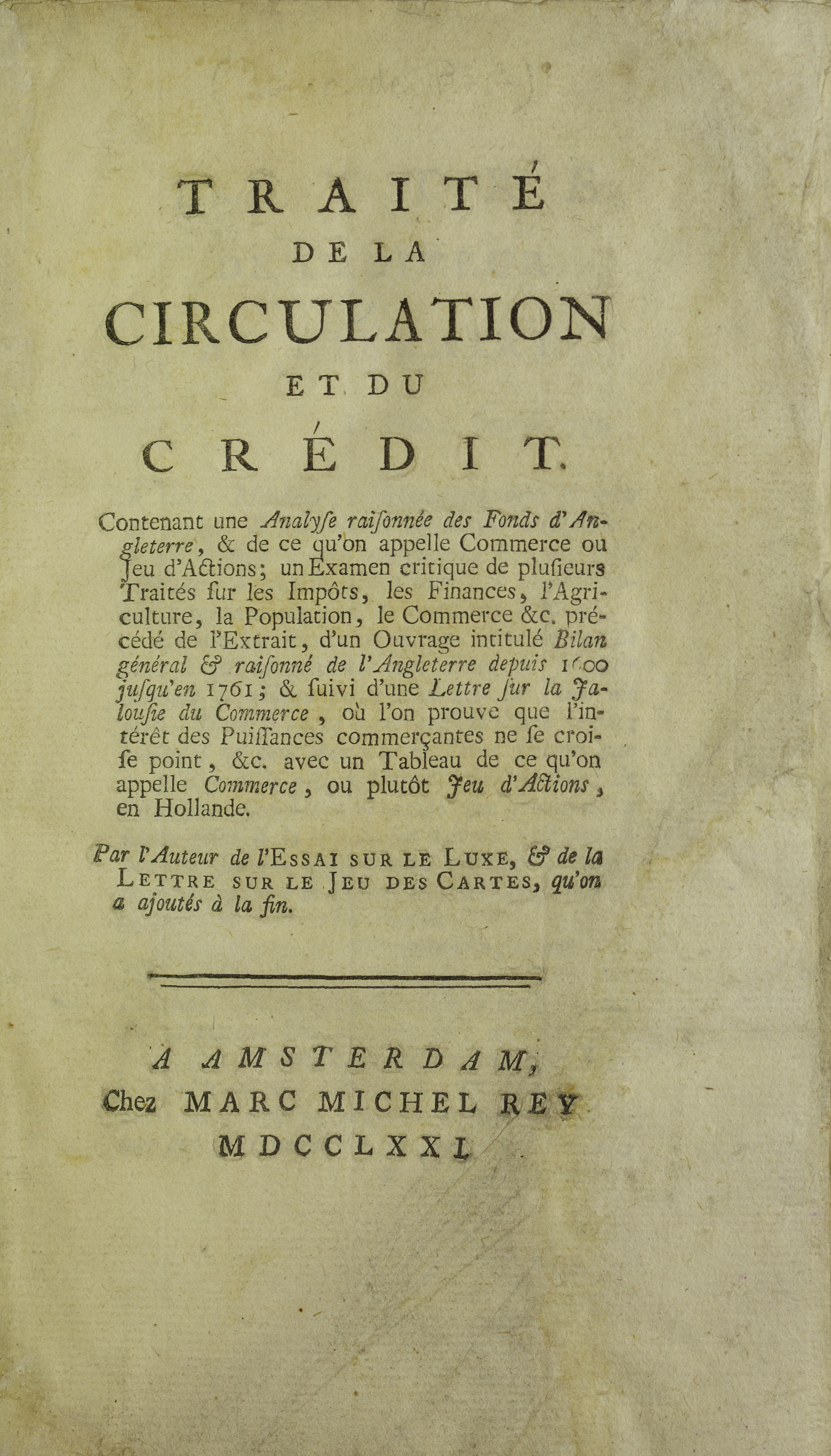
Traité de la circulation et du crédit, published by Marc-Michel Rey in 1771

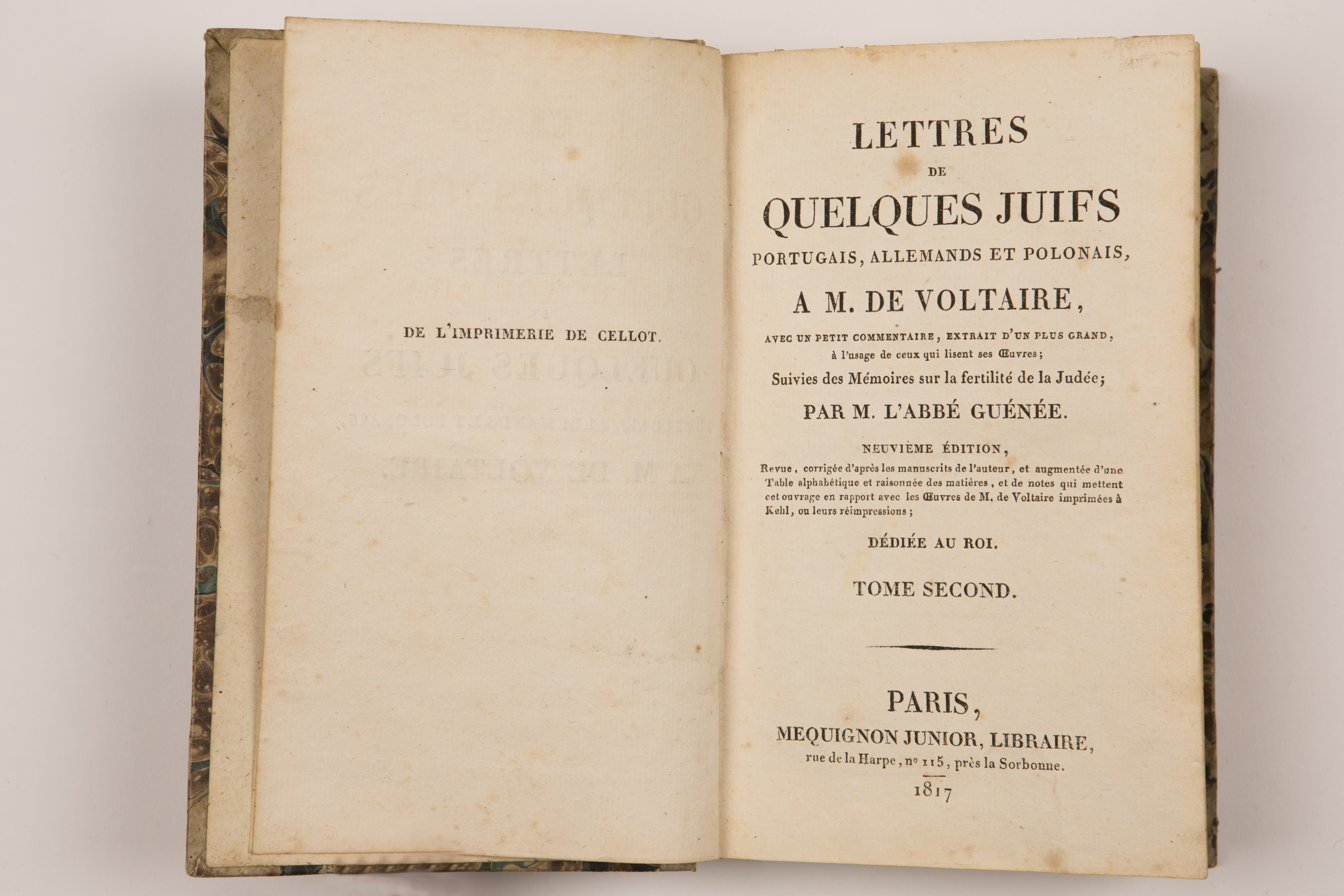
Letters from some Portuguese, German and Polish Jews to Voltaire, 1817 (9th edition), Paris. In the collection of the Jewish Museum of Switzerland.

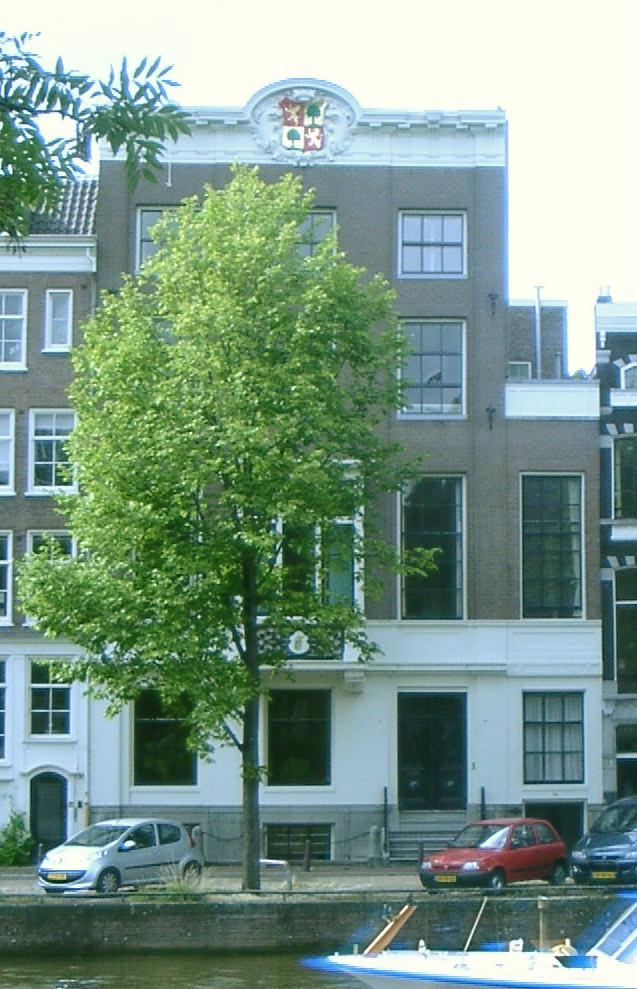
Nieuwe Herengracht 99

Isaac de Pinto (10 April 1717 – 13 August 1787) was a Dutch merchant and banker of Portuguese Sephardic Jewish origin who was one of the main investors in the Dutch East India Company, as well as a scholar and philosophe who concentrated on Jewish emancipation and national debt. Pinto published mainly in French and once in Portuguese. According to historian Richard Popkin, Pinto "was one of the very few Jews of the eighteenth century, before Moses Mendelssohn, able to operate and express himself in the mainstreams of European culture."

== Life ==
Pinto had his brit milah on 18 April 1717; this likely means he was born on 10 April and received his Bar Mitzvah in 1730. On 29 December 1734, the 17-year-old Pinto was married to Rachel Nuñes Henriques; the couple never had any children. In 1748, Pinto helped William IV of Orange, sending or lending him money to defeat the French at Bergen op Zoom. In return he asked for the removal of measures against Jewish merchants forbidding them to sell clothes, gherkins or fish on the street. He proposed opening the guilds to Jews, and sending the poorest to Surinam. In 1750, he was appointed president of the Dutch East India Company by the stadtholder. In 1755 he was visited by Frederick the Great, travelling incognito through the Netherlands; together they visited Gerrit Braamcamp.

Pinto was a man of broad learning, but he did not begin to write until nearly forty-five, when he acquired a reputation by defending his co-religionists against Voltaire. His first known published work is the Patriotic Tribute from 1747 to 1748, which consists of three essays in which De Pinto reflects on the public finances of the eighteenth century Dutch Republic. In 1762, he published his Essai sur le Luxe at Amsterdam. In the same year, Pinto published Apologie pour la Nation Juive, ou Réflexions Critiques and sent a manuscript copy of this work directly to Voltaire. Antoine Guenée reproduced the Apologie at the head of his Lettres de Quelques Juifs Portugais, Allemands et Polonais, à M. de Voltaire.

In 1761, Isaac and his brother Aron went bankrupt, potentially as a result of raising loans of around 6 million guilders for the British government in either 1759 or 1761; his brother sold his house on Nieuwe Herengracht. Pinto moved to Paris, where he met with James Cockburn, Lord Hertford, Mattheus Lestevenon, David Hume John Russell, 4th Duke of Bedford and Denis Diderot. Then he moved to The Hague and lived in a mansion at Lange Voorhout; he and his family were invited to the palace when the young Wolfgang Amadeus Mozart and his sister Nannerl performed. In 1767, he went to London, meeting with Lord Bute and receiving a pension for his advice on the Treaty of Paris (1763), as the British had gained influence over the French in India through his suggestion. In 1768, Pinto sent a letter to Diderot on Du Jeu de Cartes. His Traité de la Circulation et du Crédit, in which he convinced many people that England was not on the verge of bankruptcy, was published in Amsterdam in 1771.

Pinto opposed Raynal after the publication of Raynal's book on global colonization L'Histoire philosophique et politique des établissements et du commerce des Européens dans les deux Indes (The Philosophical and Political History of the Two Indies). He disagreed with Hume, Vivant de Mezague and Mirabeau. His treatise was twice reprinted, besides being translated into English by Philip Francis (politician) and into German by Carl August von Struensee, the Prussian minister of finance. His Précis des Arguments Contre les Matérialistes was published at The Hague in 1774. The work may have attracted the attention of Jean-Paul Marat, who met De Pinto during his stay in the Dutch Republic. On 25 February 1775, De Pinto provided Marat with a letter of introduction to the Utrecht scholar Rijklof Michael van Goens.

In 1776, he published pamphlets denouncing the American Revolution, which he asserted subverted order in both the New World and the Old. Around 1780, he wrote against an alliance of the Dutch Republic with France, although this alliance was later realized in the Treaty of Fontainebleau (1785).

== Legacy ==
Various authors, both contemporary and later, commented on Pinto's writings. One of them, Karl Marx, derisively referred to Pinto - whom he regarded as a major exponent of the free-market liberalism he criticized - as the "Pindar of the Amsterdam stock exchange" for his glorification of the Dutch financial system.

== Sources ==
- Didot, Nouvelle Biographie Générale, p. 282;
- Barbier, Dictionnaire des Anonymes;
- Dictionnaire d'Economie Politicale, ii.;
- Hay, M.E. (ed.) (2025), Isaac de Pinto's Patriotic Tribute. Three Essays on Dutch Public Finances (ISBN 979-8-3064-8757-1)
- Quérard, La France Littéraire, in Allgemeine Litteraturzeitung, 1787, No. 273.
- Nijenhuis, I.J.A.(1992) Een joodse "philosophe". Isaac de Pinto (1717–1787) en de ontwikkeling van de politieke economie in de Europese Verlichting.
