= Barry Clifford =

Underwater archaeologist, discovered pirate ship Whydah

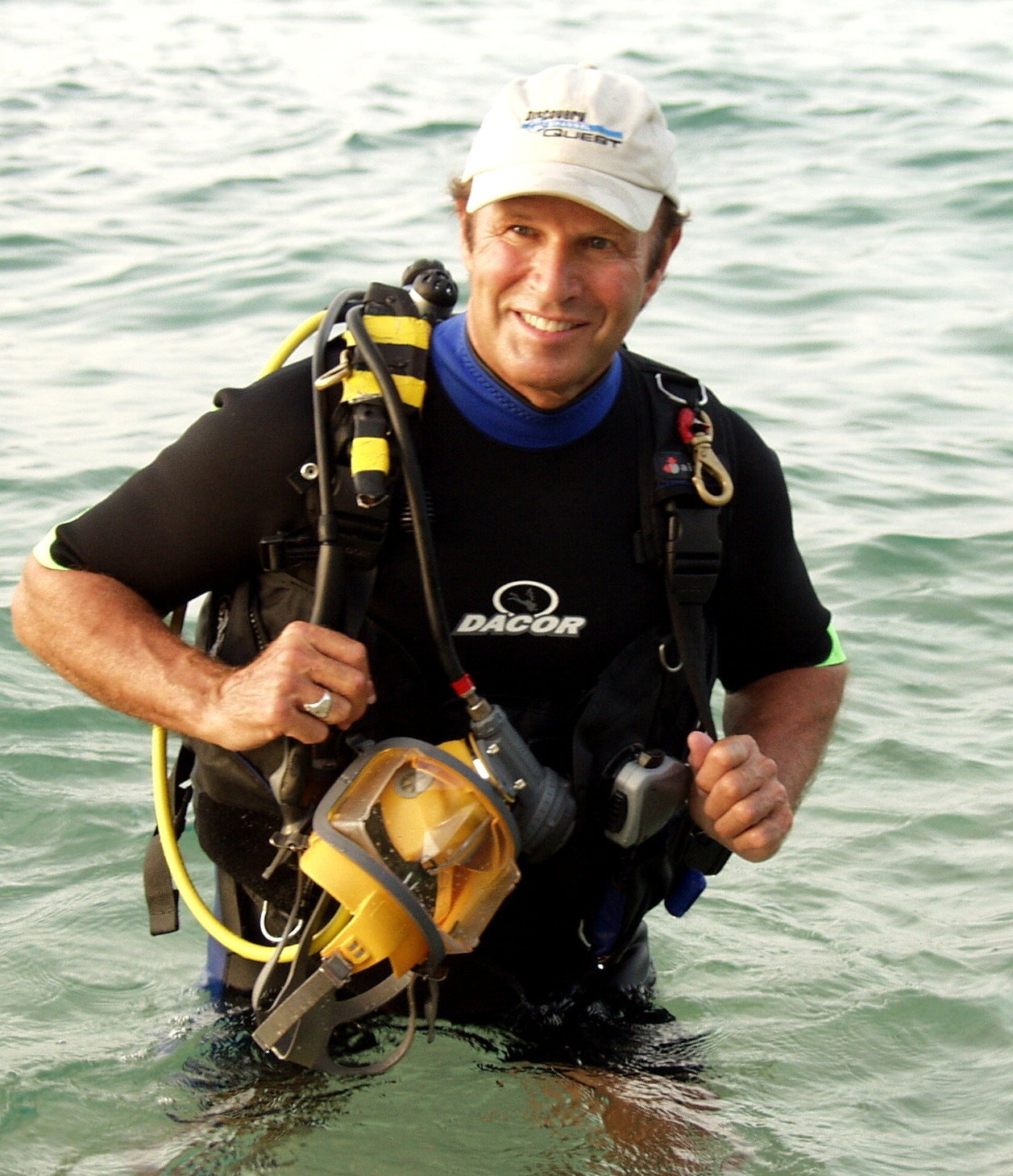
- Clifford c. 2009
- Born: Hyannis, Massachusetts, U.S.
- Occupation: Maritime archaeologist

Barry Clifford is an American underwater archaeological explorer.

Around 1982, Clifford began discovering the remains of the Whydah Gally, a former slave ship captured by pirate Samuel Bellamy which sunk in 1717, during the Golden Age of Piracy. In 1988, the Massachusetts Supreme Court ruled that 100% of the Whydah rightfully belonged to Clifford who has opened his own Whydah Pirate Museum in West Yarmouth, Massachusetts. A smaller selection of artifacts was previously on an international touring exhibition through a National Geographic/Premier Exhibitions joint venture, called Real Pirates. In 2022, a permanent museum named Real Pirates was opened in Salem, Massachusetts displaying more artifacts from the shipwreck.

== Biography ==
=== Early life ===
Born in 1945 on Cape Cod, Barry Clifford graduated from Maine Central Institute in Pittsfield, Maine before earning a bachelor's degree in History and Sociology from Western Colorado University in Gunnison, Colorado, and received graduate training at Bridgewater State College in Bridgewater, Massachusetts.

=== Career ===
In 1999 and 2000, Clifford and his project team completed three expeditions to Île Sainte-Marie off the coast of Madagascar, as a Discovery Channel Expedition Adventure initiative and tentatively identified the pirate ship Adventure Galley (flagship of William Kidd) and another pirate ship which could be the Fiery Dragon (commanded by the pirate Christopher Condent, also known as William Condon).

On 13 May 2014, it was reported by The Independent that a team led by Clifford believed they had found the wreck of the Santa María, flagship of Christopher Columbus. In May 2015, Clifford found what he claimed was a 50-kilogram (110 lb) silver ingot in a wreck off the coast of Île Sainte-Marie in Madagascar that he believes was part of Captain Kidd's treasure. He stated, "People have been looking for it for 300 years. To literally have it hit me on the head - I thought what the heck just happened to me. I really didn't expect this."

In 2024, Clifford had continued his work with Expedition Whydah. Clifford returned to the wreck site of the pirate ship Whydah Gally off of the coast of Cape Cod. This expedition was featured on the Discovery Channel series Expedition Unknown. Host Josh gates joins Clifford and underwater field archaeologist Brandon Clifford in an investigation of the wreck to find artifacts from the sunken ship. This episode highlights the ongoing archaeological search of the site more that three centuries after it had sank in 1717.

== Works ==
Clifford has authored articles and books on his explorations; including The Pirate Prince (Prentice Hall/Simon & Schuster, New York, 1993), Expedition Whydah (HarperCollins, New York, 1999), The Lost Fleet (HarperCollins, New York, 2000), Return to Treasure Island (HarperCollins, New York, 2003), They Lived to Tell the Tale (The Explorers’ Club 2007) Real Pirates: The Untold Story... (The National Geographic Society, 2007), and a 2007 National Geographic children's book of the same name.

His work has been the subject of television documentaries and features as well; including Black Bellamy's Treasure (PBS), Search for Pirate Gold (Nova), Sea-Raiders (Turner Broadcasting), The Hunt for Amazing Treasures (NBC) concerning his discovery of a treasure-filled cannon from the Whydah, Lost Treasure of King Charles I (Discovery Channel), Sea Tales (A&E), Pirates of The Whydah (National Geographic), The Lost Fleet (Discovery Channel/BBC-One), Quest for Captain Kidd (Discovery Channel), Quest for Columbus (Discovery Channel), and The Pirate Code (National Geographic). In 2008 the National Geographic Channel aired a two-hour documentary about the ongoing excavation of the wreck of the Whydah Gally, featuring in-depth interviews with Clifford. It was subsequently released on DVD.

A 2002–03 action-adventure television series entitled Adventure Inc. produced by Gale Anne Hurd was "inspired by the real life exploits of explorer Barry Clifford." Clifford is also credited as a consultant for that show.

He is a Fellow of the Explorers Club, a 2005 recipient of the Lowell Thomas Award for underwater archaeology, and an Honorary Member of the Boston Marine Society. In 2006, he was named "Explorer-in-Residence" by the American Museum of Natural History in New York.

== See also ==
- Whydah Gally
- Samuel Bellamy
- Archaeology of shipwrecks
- Maritime archeology
- Underwater archeology
- Wreck diving
