= Antoine Guenée =

French Catholic priest and apologist (1717–1803)

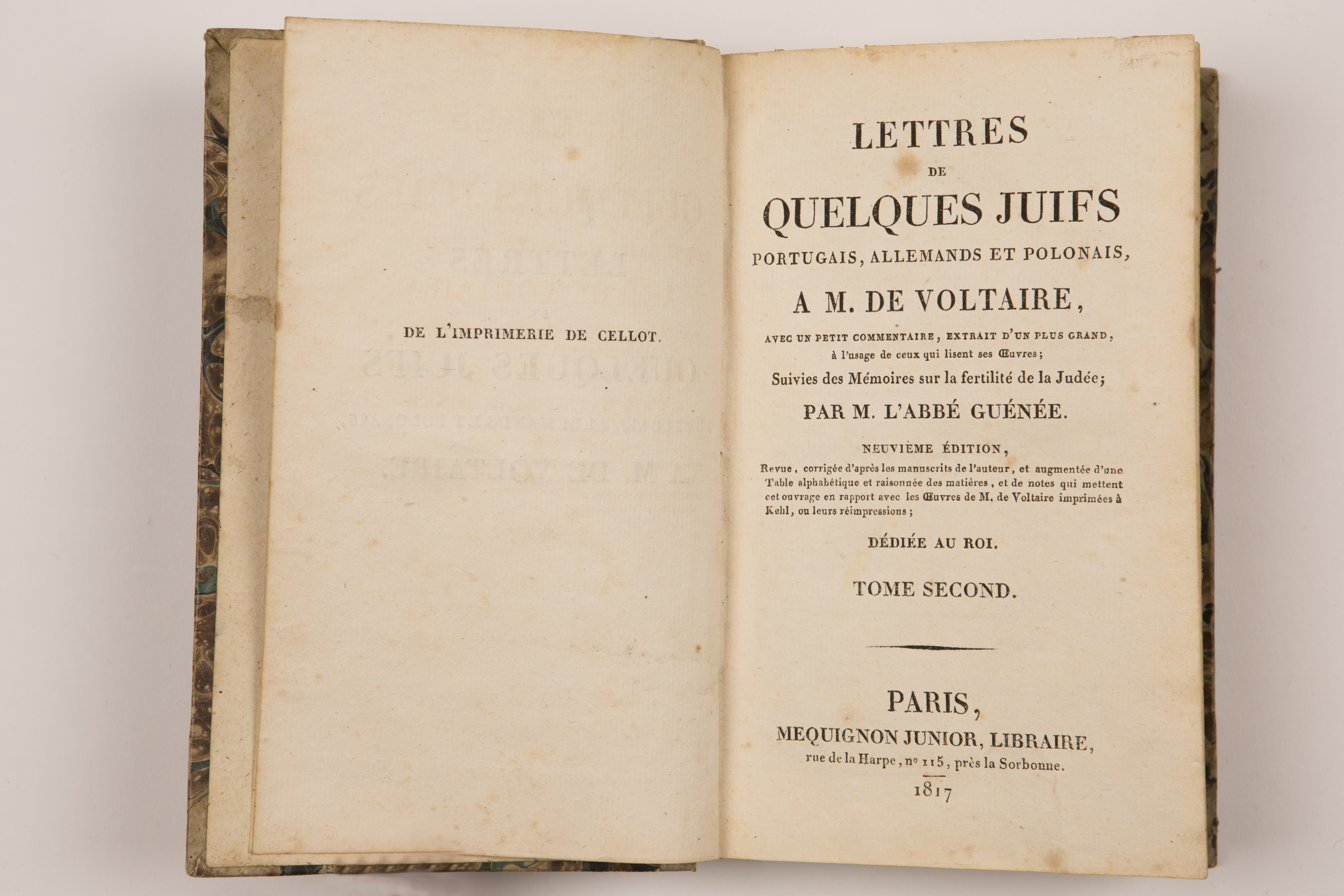
Antoine Guénée, Letters from some Portuguese, German and Polish Jews to Voltaire, 1817 (9th edition), Paris. In the collection of the Jewish Museum of Switzerland.

Antoine Guenée (23 November 1717 – 27 November 1803) was a French Catholic priest and apologist, born at Étampes.

He wrote, besides various apologetic works, Lettres de Quelques Juifs Portugais, Allemands et Polonais, à M. de Voltaire, Paris, 1769, often reprinted and translated into English and other languages. Along with the prominent Sephardic Jew, Isaac De Pinto, Guenée defends the Jews against Voltaire's criticisms of their religion and way of life.
