= Giambattista Almici =

Italian jurist

Giambattista Almici (Latin: Joannes Baptista Almici) (17 January 1717 – 14 July 1793) was an Italian jurist.

== Biography ==
Giambattista Almici was born near Brescia, educated under the Jesuits, and at the University of Padua in the Republic of Venice. He finally gave himself up to legal studies. After some official employments in which he gained great popularity, he traveled over Italy and Sicily. His marriage in 1771, and his family, seem have induced him to live in a more retired manner, and devote himself more to study. His published work includes the Essay on Reason, or Natural Law Against the Disappointment of Search a Study, (Note: De Tipaldo 1834, p. 478. The name of the first book by Giambattista Almici is based on a translation from Latin. Its original title reads as follows: Saggio sopra la ragione, ossia Legge naturale contro disapprovatori di un tal studio.) a dissertation printed in Brescia in 1748; which was premiered by the author as a preliminary speech to the translation of Pufendorf, his second work is The law of nature and of the people, or is the general system of the most important principles of moral jurisprudence and politics, of Samuele, baron of Pufendorf, (Note: Roux 1759, p. 189. The name of the second book by Giambattista Almici is also based on a translation from Latin. Its original title reads as follows: Il Diritto Della Natura E Delle Genti O Sia Sistema Generale De' Principii Li Piu Importanti Di Morale, Giurisprudenza e Politica.) which was rectified, enlarged and illustrated by Giambattista Almici of Bresciano, a work related to Pufendorf that was later examined by other authors, such as Maurizio Bazzoli's Giambattista Almici e la diffusione di Pufendorf nel settecento italiano (1979). The third of his works is the book Organizations, law of nature, and nations, according to Catholic Principles, (Note: Bustamante y Urrutia 1956, p. 148 The name of the third book by Giambattista Almici is also based on a translation from Latin. The original title reads as follows: Institutiones Juris Naturae, et Gentium Secundum Catholica Principa.) on the cover of this book is a quote, which has probably legal reference, it is said that "Nothing remarkable well suited to man, is to train to justice.", (Note: Almicus, Joannes Baptista (1768). Institutiones juris naturae, et gentium secundum catholica principia (in Latin). excudebat Joannes Baptista Bossini. The original phrasing in latin on the cover reads as follows: Nihil tam praeclarum, hominique conveniens est, quam erudire homines ad justitiam.) which was published in 1768. His fourth of his works is the book Remarks on the book of Mr. Elvezio entitled The Spirit of Giambatista Almici, (Note: Almici, Giovanni Battista (1766). Osservazioni sopra il libro del signor Elvezio intitolato Lo Spirito di Giambatista Almici (in Italian). per Giambatista Bossini. p. 114. The name of his fourth book also based on a translation from Latin. The original title reads as follows: Osservazioni sopra il libro del signor Elvezio intitolato Lo Spirito.) that was published in 1766, a dedication to Angelo Contarini, Venetian procurator and reformer of the University of Padova. His brother Camillo Almici was an Italian priest and Oratorian.
