= Samuel Bellamy =

English pirate (1689–1717)

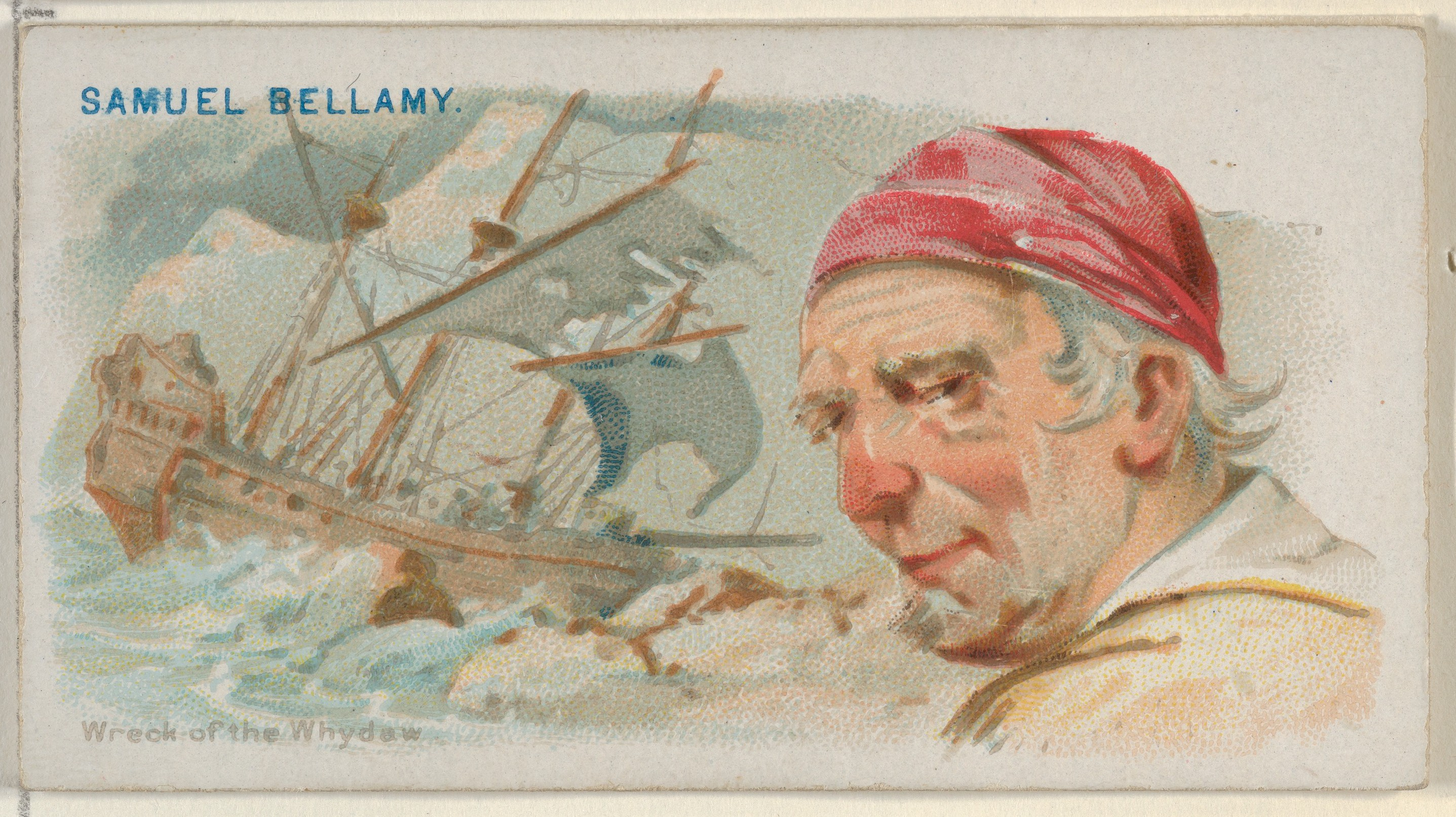
- Samuel Bellamy, Wreck of the Whydah, from the Pirates of the Spanish Main series (N19) for Allen & Ginter Cigarettes MET DP835027
- Born: c. 23 February 1689; Hittisleigh, Devon, Kingdom of England, or London
- Died: 26 April 1717 (aged 28); Wellfleet, Province of Massachusetts Bay, Thirteen Colonies
- Piratical career
- Nickname: "Black Sam" Bellamy, "Prince of Pirates", "Black Bellamy", "Robin Hood of the Sea" (Note: None of these nicknames can be traced to period sources, and all likely were likely attached to Bellamy at a later date.)
- Type: Golden Age of Piracy
- Years active: 1716 – 26 April 1717
- Rank: Elected Commodore of pirate fleet
- Base of operations: Blanco Islet, Tortola B.V.I. (later re-named Bellamy Cay), Caribbean Sea
- Commands: Postillion, Sloop Marianne, Pinque Mary Anne, Sultana Galley, Whydah Gally, Anne, Fisher
- Wealth: Equiv. US$179.4 million in 2025; #1 Forbes top-earning pirates (Note: Often cited, the Forbes article on "Wealthiest Pirates" did not list several notable pirates likely to have exceeded Bellamy, such as Dirk Chivers, Richard Taylor, or others.)

Captain Samuel Bellamy (c. 23 February 1689 – 26 April 1717), erroneously known as "Black Sam" Bellamy, was an English sailor turned pirate during the early 18th century. He is best known as one of the wealthiest pirates in the Golden Age of Piracy. Though his known career as a pirate captain lasted little more than a year, he and his crew captured at least 53 ships.

Bellamy was born in England in 1689, and began sailing for the British Royal Navy as a teenager. After traveling to Cape Cod around 1715, he then went south to the Florida coast in an effort to locate a sunken treasure fleet. From there he made his way to the Bahamas, sailing under Benjamin Hornigold and his second-in-command, Edward "Blackbeard" Teach. After Hornigold and Teach were voted out of command, Bellamy took a captured vessel as his own, before capturing a state-of-the-art slave trade ship, the Whydah Gally, in the early spring of 1717. Two months later, the vessel was caught in a nor'easter storm off the coast of Massachusetts and sank, taking Bellamy and most of his crew down with it. The remains of the Whydah Gally were discovered in 1984, making it the first fully authenticated Golden Age pirate ship discovered in North America.

== Early life ==
Bellamy may have been born in 1689 in the parish of Hittisleigh on Dartmoor in Devon, Kingdom of England, the youngest of six known children of Stephen and Elizabeth Bellamy. Alternately, a sailor captured by Bellamy testified in 1716 that Bellamy "declared himself to be an Englishman born in London." Elizabeth died soon after, and was buried on 23 February 1689, three weeks before Samuel's baptism on 18 March. The future pirate became a sailor at a young age; in his late teens, he joined the Royal Navy and fought in several battles. Though it has been speculated that he may have had a wife and child, there is no definite historical proof of this.

Bellamy traveled to Cape Cod around 1715, allegedly to seek some of his relatives there. According to an abundance of local lore on the subject, it is believed that he took up an affair with a local beauty, Goody Hallett — the "Witch of Wellfleet". Professor Elizabeth Reynard, in her 1934 book The Narrow Land, gave her the name "Maria", and though there is no evidence of her bearing that name, it has nevertheless become a popular name for her. Other modern authors have called her "Mariah" and "Mary". Her age and marital status remain subjects of much debate. Some stories depict her as a young lady between 16 and 25, while others depict her as a very old woman. In some stories, her parents liked Bellamy, but did not think a poor self-confident sailor was husband material; circumstantial evidence indicates that she may have already been married, confirming some stories that it was Bellamy's intent to seek his fortune and then return, not to marry her, but to take her away.

He left Cape Cod in early 1716 with a group of men to seek the vast treasures of the 1715 Spanish Treasure Fleet, which had wrecked the previous summer in a hurricane off the east coast of Florida. Wealthy jeweler Palgraves Williams, son of Rhode Island Attorney General John Williams, joined Bellamy and funded their expedition. After Bellamy left the Cape, Hallett was found to be pregnant by Bellamy. It is said that she gave birth to a son and hid the child in a barn for warmth while she foraged for food, and when she returned she found that the child had choked to death on the straw. Some legends say that it was the barn of the notable Knowles family; others claim it was that of Justice Joseph Doane, who had banished Hallett. In either case, she was arrested for the child's murder and imprisoned in the Old Jail of Barnstable, Massachusetts (the oldest wooden jail house in the United States; said to be haunted by her). Her sentence was relatively short, but she was exiled from the town. Afterwards, she waited for Bellamy in Eastham.

== Career ==
The treasure hunters apparently met with little success, as they soon turned to piracy in the crew of pirate captain Benjamin Hornigold, who commanded the Marianne with his first mate, Edward Teach, who would soon gain fame as the pirate "Blackbeard".

In the summer of 1716, the crew became irritated by Hornigold's unwillingness to attack ships of England, his home country. By a majority vote of the crew, Hornigold was deposed as captain of the Marianne and left the vessel with his loyal followers, including Teach. The remaining 90-man crew then elected Bellamy as captain.

Upon capturing a second ship, the Sultana, it was made into a galley, and with approval of the crew, Bellamy took it as his own and assigned his friend Palsgrave Williams as commander of the Marianne. They sailed briefly alongside Olivier Levasseur, who left early in 1717 to raid South America after meeting former pirate John Ham to sell off some of their loot.

"...they spread a large black flag, with a Death's Head and Bones across, and gave chase to Cap't. Prince under the same colours." – Thomas Baker (Bellamy's crew)

Bellamy's greatest capture came in the spring of 1717, when he spotted the Whydah Gally (pronounced WHID-uh) sailing through the Windward Passage between Hispaniola and Cuba. Built in England in 1715 as a state-of-the-art, 300-ton, 102-foot-long (31 m) English slave ship with 18 guns, and with speeds of up to 13 knots (24 km/h; 15 mph), the Whydah was on its maiden voyage in 1716 and had just finished the second (Africa to Caribbean) leg of the Atlantic slave trade, loaded with a fortune in gold, indigo, Jesuit's bark, ivory and other precious trade goods from the sale of 312 slaves. Bellamy chased the Whydah for three days before getting close enough to fire. After a single shot, Captain Lawrence Prince surrendered the Whydah by lowering its flag. True to his reputation for generosity, Bellamy rewarded Prince's lack of resistance by trading the Sultana for the Whydah. Removing the captain's quarters and upgrading the ship to 28 guns, Bellamy turned his new flagship northwards along the eastern coast of the Carolinas and on to New England.

Captain Charles Johnson (a pseudonym) in A General History of the Robberies and Murders of the Most Notorious Pyrates relates the story of the Whydah overtaking a sloop commanded by Captain Beer. Bellamy wanted to let the captain keep his ship, but his crew voted to burn it, and the captain of the merchant vessel declined an invitation to join the pirates. Bellamy is attributed with making this now-famous speech:

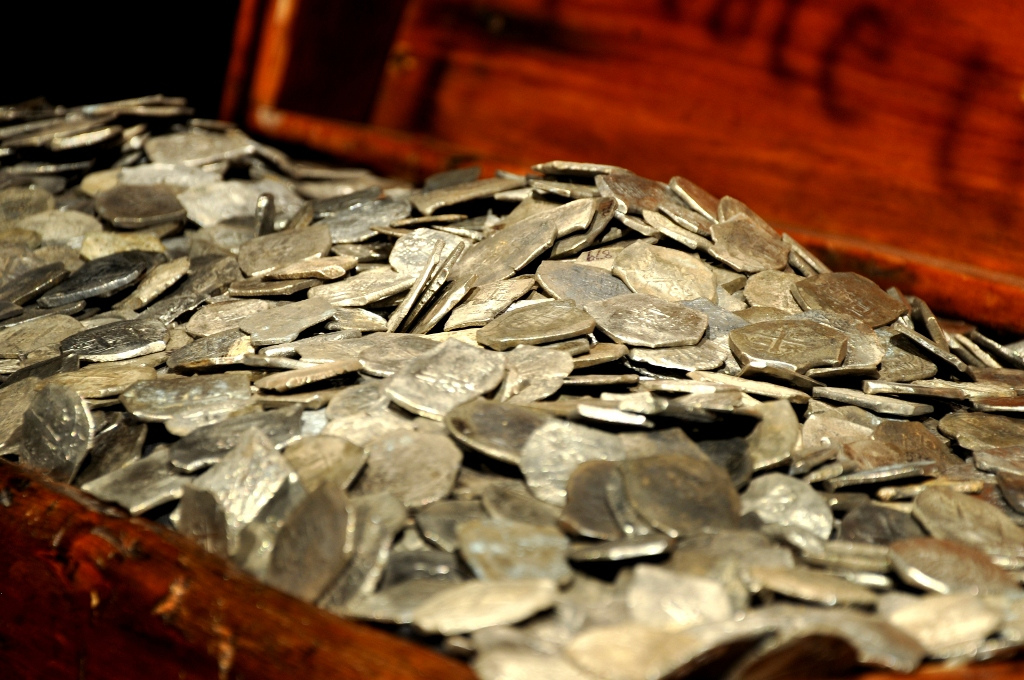
Silver recovered from the wreck of the Whydah. Forbes Magazine ranked Bellamy #1 in its list of "Top-Earning Pirates".

I am sorry they won't let you have your sloop again, for I scorn to do any one a mischief, when it is not to my advantage; damn the sloop, we must sink her, and she might be of use to you. Though you are a sneaking puppy, and so are all those who will submit to be governed by laws which rich men have made for their own security; for the cowardly whelps have not the courage otherwise to defend what they get by knavery; but damn ye altogether: damn them for a pack of crafty rascals, and you, who serve them, for a parcel of hen-hearted numbskulls. They vilify us, the scoundrels do, when there is only this difference, they rob the poor under the cover of law, forsooth, and we plunder the rich under the protection of our own courage. Had you not better make then one of us, than sneak after these villains for employment?

[Beer replied that his conscience would not let him break the laws of God and man, and Bellamy continued]

You are a devilish conscience rascal! I am a free prince, and I have as much authority to make war on the whole world as he who has a hundred sail of ships at sea and an army of 100,000 men in the field; and this my conscience tells me! But there is no arguing with such snivelling puppies, who allow superiors to kick them about deck at pleasure.

— Captain Bellamy, quoted by Captain Charles Johnson (1724), A General History of the Robberies and Murders of the Most Notorious Pyrates

Johnson attributes these speeches to "Captain Bellamy" without naming Samuel Bellamy specifically; other writers like Philip Gosse attribute the speeches to Charles Bellamy, a separate pirate unrelated to Samuel Bellamy. They operated at the same time in the same areas and their exploits are often conflated.

== Death ==
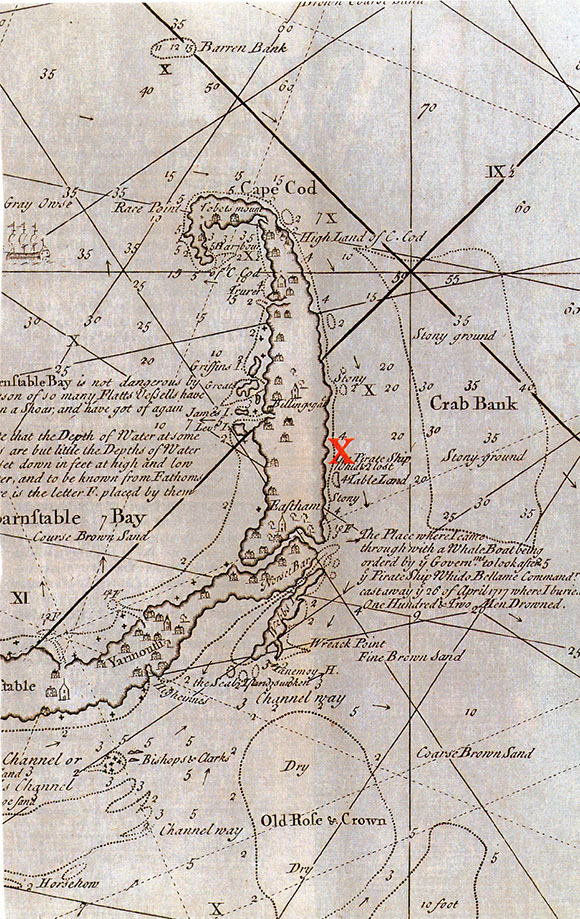
The location of the wrecked Whydah Gally in Cape Cod

Just two months after acquiring the Whydah, as she and the Marianne approached Cape Cod, Williams told Bellamy that he wished to visit his family in Rhode Island, and the two agreed to meet up again near Maine. Bellamy and the Whydah captured several other small vessels in the area, including the Anne Galley, to which he appointed his quartermaster Richard Noland as captain.

If Bellamy intended to revisit his lover Maria Hallett, he failed. The Whydah was swept up in a violent nor'easter storm off Cape Cod at midnight, on 26 April 1717, and was driven onto the sand bar shoals in 16 feet (4.9 m) of water some 500 feet (150 m) from the coast of what is now Wellfleet, Massachusetts. At 15 minutes past midnight, the masts snapped and drew the heavily loaded ship into 30 feet (9.1 m) of water, where she capsized and quickly sank, taking Bellamy and all but two of the Whydah's 146-man crew with her.

104 bodies were known to have washed ashore and were buried by the town coroner, leaving 42 bodies unaccounted for. The Mary Anne was also wrecked that night several miles south of the Whydah, leaving seven more survivors. All nine survivors from the two ships were captured and prosecuted for piracy in Boston, and six were convicted on 22 October 1717 and hanged on 15 November 1717. (King George's pardon of all pirates, issued on 5 September, supposedly arrived in Boston three weeks too late). Two were set free, the court believing their testimony that they had been forced into piracy. The last, a 16-year-old Miskito from Mosquitia, John Julian, was believed to have been sold into slavery to John Quincy, the great-grandfather of U.S. President John Quincy Adams.

Williams waited for Bellamy to rendezvous; when Bellamy never appeared, Williams realized what had happened, and sailed south to Nassau in the Marianne. Noland also searched for Bellamy off Maine; failing to find him, he took the Anne Galley south, raiding ships along the way before accepting a pardon in the Bahamas.

== Reputation ==
A flag used by Bellamy, described as “A black Ensign, with Death holding an Hour-Glass in one Hand and a [speaking] Trumpet in the other”.

Captain Samuel Bellamy was well known to his contemporaries and chroniclers as a distinctive figure, a tall, strong, well-mannered and very tidy man. He liked expensive clothes, especially black coats, and his favorite weapons were four duelling pistols that he always carried in his sash:

He made a dashing figure in his long deep-cuffed velvet coat, knee breeches, silk stockings, and silver-buckled shoes; with a sword slung on his left hip and four pistols on his sash. Unlike some of his fellows, Bellamy never wore the fashionable powdered wig, but grew his dark hair long and tied it back with a black satin bow.

As captain, he led in the democratic style typical of Golden Age pirates. His crew was very fond of him, sometimes even referring to him as "Robin Hood of the Sea" and themselves as "Robin Hood's Men". Captain Bellamy was also a good tactician. Usually, he had two ships under his control. His flagship was powerful with many cannons and the second one was light but fast, which made a good balance. With coordinated attacks, they managed to capture ships easily without harming them.

== Legacy ==
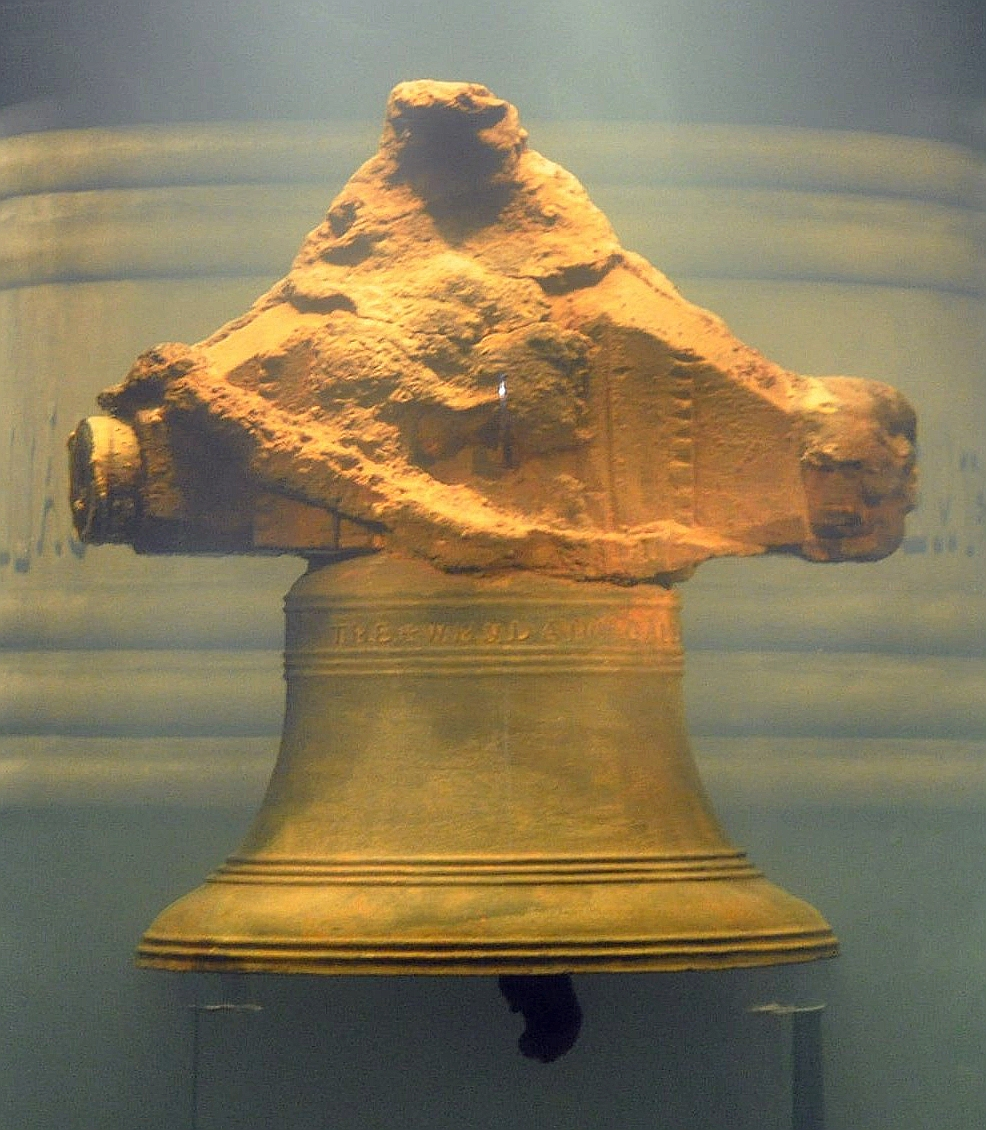
The bell, inscribed, "THE WHYDAH GALLY 1716".

In July 1984, Bellamy became famous again when the discovery of the wreckage of his flagship Whydah was announced, and would soon become the first authenticated pirate shipwreck ever discovered in North America. At the time of its sinking, the Whydah was the largest pirate prize ever captured, and the treasure in its hold amassed roughly 4.5 to 5 tons, including huge quantities of indigo, ivory, gold, and 20,000 to 30,000 pounds sterling, divided into 180 sacks of 50-pound (23 kg) each. The discovery of the wreck was made in 1982 by a diving crew led and funded by underwater explorer Barry Clifford.

The vessel was under just 14 feet (4.3 m) of water and 5 feet (1.5 m) of sand.

In 1985, Clifford recovered the ship's bell, upon which were the words "THE WHYDAH GALLY 1716", the first incontrovertible evidence of his find. He subsequently founded The Whydah Pirate Museum on MacMillan Wharf in Provincetown, Massachusetts, which was later moved to West Yarmouth, Massachusetts, dedicated to Bellamy and the Whydah. It houses many artifacts which were brought from the wreck, including a cannon found to be stuffed with precious stones, gold and artifacts. A portion of the some 200,000 artifacts so far recovered went on a six-year tour around the United States under the sponsorship of the National Geographic Society. From May 2017 through 30 July 2017, it was at the Portland Science Center in Portland, Maine. In 2022, Real Pirates opened in Salem, Massachusetts, also displaying information about Bellamy, the Whydah, and artifacts from the wreck.

Suspected remains of Bellamy were found near the wreck of his ship, in February 2018. The bones were near a pistol thought to be his, and DNA tests were carried out with a living relative to confirm. In May 2018, tests confirmed that the bones were of an Eastern European man, though not Bellamy.

In February 2021, Clifford announced six more pirates' bones were discovered in concretements of debris, and will be tested for DNA matches once they are extracted.

== In popular culture ==
- In the manga One Piece, the pirate character Bellamy the Hyena is named after Samuel Bellamy.
- He appears in Assassin's Creed: Pirates as one of the most notorious and colorful pirates of the era.
- The Netflix docudrama series The Lost Pirate Kingdom features his pirate career prominently, though with some historical inaccuracies.
- De Chastelaine, Alexander (2022), Black Sam - The Pirate Tale of Sam Bellamy and Mehitable Brown ISBN 9798322095491
- The historical novel If The Tide Turns by Rachel Rueckert explores the relationship between Sam Bellamy and Goody Hallett.
- The musical The Royal Pyrate by Jason Landon Marcus and Chas Libretto, based loosely on the exploits of Sam Bellamy and his relationship with Goody Hallet, premiered in August 2025 at the Waterfront Barge Museum in Red Hook, Brooklyn.
