= Whydah Gally =

Pirate ship of Samuel Bellamy

Coordinates: 41.892°N 69.9594°W

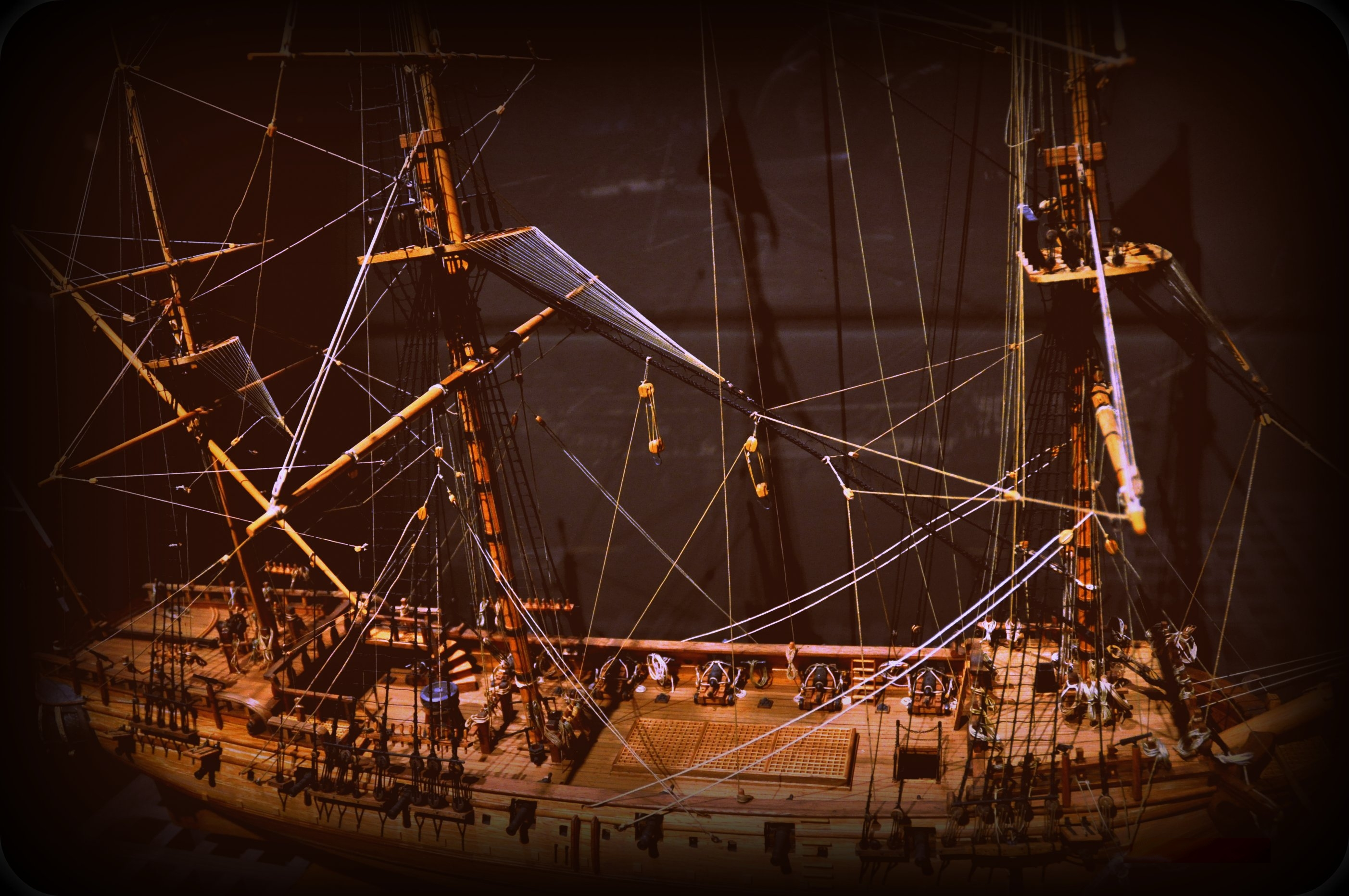
- Model of Whydah Gally

History

Great Britain
- Name: Whydah Gally
- Namesake: The African slave port Ouidah
- Owner: Sir Humphry Morice
- Operator: Private vessel
- Laid down: 1715, London
- Launched: 1716, London
- Home port: London
- Fate: Captured by pirates
- Commander: Captain Lawrence Prince
- Chased by pirates: Late Feb, 1717; Windward Passage
- Surrendered / Captured: three days later, near the lower Bahamas

History

Pirate
- Name: Whydah Gally
- Owner: Crew of Captain/Commodore Samuel Bellamy
- Acquired: late February, 1717
- Home port: Blanco Islet, B.V.I. (later re-named Bellamy Cay) Caribbean Sea
- Fate: ran aground, capsized
- Status: Ruins under perpetual recovery and conservation; private ownership and exclusive dive rights
- Commander: Samuel Bellamy
- Wrecked: late night of 26 April 1717, Billingsgate, Cape Cod, Massachusetts Bay Colony
- Discovered: 1984, by Barry Clifford
- Authenticated: 1985, by discovery of the ship's inscribed bell and a brass placard, both inscribed with ship's name

General characteristics
- Type: Galley
- Tons burthen: 300 tons BM
- Length: 110 ft (34 m)
- Propulsion: Sail & oar
- Sail plan: fully rigged, 3 masts
- Speed: 13 knots (24 km/h; 15 mph)
- Complement: 150 men at launch; went down with 145 men & 1 boy (incl. 6 prisoners)
- Armament: At launch: 18 active guns Pirate upgrade: 28 active guns Recovered: More than 65, recovery ongoing
- Notes: Whydah was the flagship of a 5-ship fleet which included the Marianne, Mary Anne, Anne, and Fisher

Whydah Gally /ˈhwɪdə ˈɡæli, ˈhwɪdˌɔː/ (commonly known simply as the Whydah) was a fully rigged ship that was originally built as a passenger, cargo, and slave ship. On the return leg of her maiden voyage of the triangle trade, Whydah Gally was captured by the pirate Captain Samuel Bellamy, beginning a new role in the Golden Age of Piracy.

Bellamy sailed Whydah Gally up the coast of colonial America, capturing other ships as he went along. On 26 April 1717, Whydah Gally was caught in a violent storm and wrecked off the coast of Cape Cod, Massachusetts. Only two of Whydah Gally's crew survived, along with seven others who were on a sloop captured by Bellamy earlier that day. Six of the nine survivors were hanged, two who had been forced into piracy were freed, and one Indian crewman was sold into slavery.

Whydah Gally and her treasure of captured pirate gold eluded discovery for over 260 years until 1984, when the wreck was found off the coast of Cape Cod, buried under 10–50 ft (3–15 m) of sand, in depths ranging from 16–30 ft (5–9 m) deep, spread for four miles, parallel to the Cape's easternmost coast. With the discovery of the ship's bell in 1985 and a small brass placard in 2013, both inscribed with the ship's name and maiden voyage date, Whydah Gally is the only fully authenticated Golden Age pirate shipwreck ever discovered.

== Slave ship ==
Whydah Gally was commissioned in 1715 in London, England, by Sir Humphrey Morice, a member of parliament (MP), who was known as 'the foremost London slave merchant of his day'. A square-rigged three-masted galley ship, she measured 110 feet (34 m) in length, with a tonnage rating at 300 tuns burthen, and could travel at speeds up to 13 knots (24 km/h; 15 mph).

Christened Whydah Gally after the West African slave-trading Kingdom of Whydah, the vessel was configured as a heavily armed trading and transport ship (which included the Atlantic slave trade). She set out for her maiden voyage in early 1716, carrying a variety of goods from different businesses to exchange for delivery, trade, and slaves in West Africa. After traveling down the West African coast, through modern-day Gambia and Senegal to Nigeria and Benin, where its namesake port was located, she left Africa with an estimated 500 slaves, gold, including Akan jewelry, and ivory aboard. She traveled to the Caribbean, where she traded and sold the cargo and slaves for precious metals, sugar, indigo, rum, logwood, pimento, ginger, and medicinal ingredients, which were to then be transported back to England. She was fitted with a standard complement of 18 six-pound cannons, which could be increased to a total of 28 in time of war.

== Pirate ship ==
In late February 1717, Whydah Gally, under the command of Captain Lawrence Prince (not to be confused with the buccaneer who served under Sir Henry Morgan), was navigating the Windward Passage between Cuba and Hispaniola when she was attacked by pirates led by Samuel Bellamy. At the time of Whydah Gally's capture, Bellamy was in possession of two vessels, the 26-gun galleon Sultana and the converted 10-gun sloop Marianne, captained by Bellamy's friend and investor Paulsgrave Williams. After a three-day chase, Prince surrendered his ship near the Bahamas with only a desultory exchange of cannon fire.

Bellamy decided to take Whydah Gally as his new flagship; several of her crew remained with their ship and joined the pirate gang. Pirate recruitment was most effective among the unemployed, escaped bondsmen, and transported criminals, as the high seas made for an instant leveling of class distinctions. They were freed African slaves, displaced English seamen, Native Americans, and a scattering of social outcasts from Europe and elsewhere.

In a gesture of goodwill toward Captain Prince who had surrendered without a struggle—and who in any case may have been favorably known by reputation to the pirate crew—Bellamy gave Sultana to Prince, along with £20 in silver and gold (equivalent to £3,600 in 2025).

"...they spread a large black flag, with a Death's Head and Bones across, and gave chase to Cap't. Prince under the same colors." – Thomas Baker (Bellamy's crew) on Whydah pursuit

Whydah Gally was then fitted with 10 additional cannons by its new captain, and 150 members of Bellamy's crew were detailed to man the vessel. They razeed the ship by clearing the top deck of the pilot's cabin, removing the slave barricade, and getting rid of other features that made her top heavy.

Bellamy and his crew then sailed on to the Carolinas and headed north along the eastern coastline of the American colonies, aiming for the central coast of Maine, looting or capturing additional vessels on the way. Whydah Gally was caught up in a storm, which heavily damaged it and broke one of its masts. Patch-ups and repairs were effected until they reached the waters near Nantucket Sound, where greater repairs were effected, possibly at Block Island or Rhode Island. At some point during his possession of Whydah Gally, Bellamy added another 30+ cannon below decks, possibly as ballast. Two cannon recovered by underwater explorer Barry Clifford in August 2009 weighed 800 and 1,500 pounds (360 and 680 kg), respectively.

They could not wipe out the North-East gales
Nor what those gales set free —
The pirate ships with their close-reefed sails,
Leaping from sea to sea.

— —Rudyard Kipling, "The Pirates of England"

Accounts differ as to Whydah Gally's destination in her last few days. Some blame Whydah Gally's route on navigator error. In any case, on 26 April 1717, near Chatham, Massachusetts, Whydah Gally approached a thick, gray fog bank rolling across the water—signaling inclement weather ahead.

On 26 April the pirates captured the ship Mary Anne with a hold full of Madeira wine. The captain of Mary Anne refused Bellamy's request to pilot them up the coast, so Bellamy arrested the captain and five of his crew and brought them aboard Whydah Gally, leaving three of the original crew aboard Mary Anne. Then Bellamy sent 7 of his own men onboard of Mary Anne—one of whom was the carpenter Thomas South, who had been forced by Bellamy and his crew to make repairs; not wanting to join the pirate crew, he had been offered release by Bellamy after work was completed, but the surviving pirates later testified to the court that they had over-ruled Bellamy's decision and forced South to stay due to his whimpering and complaining. South testified that it was his choice to accompany the 6 pirates going aboard Mary Anne in hopes of escaping, possibly by jumping overboard and swimming ashore as they drew near to the Cape. Sometime around sunset that evening, the winds completely died, and a massive fog bank made visibility virtually nil. The four ships in Bellamy's fleet lost sight of one another. Bellamy's ships Anne (captained by his quartermaster Richard Noland) and Fisher moved out to sea (eventually making it to Damariscove Island with heavy damage). Williams had turned Marianne away earlier, putting into Block Island to visit relatives but agreeing to meet Bellamy later off Maine.

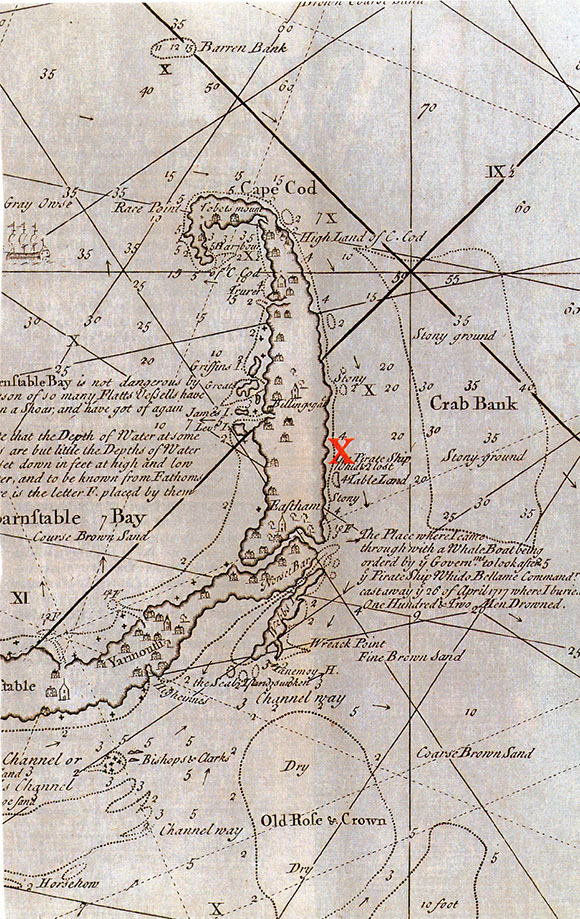
The location of the wrecked Whydah Gally in Wellfleet, Massachusetts, on Cape Cod

== Shipwreck ==
That weather turned into a violent nor'easter, a storm with gale force winds out of the east and northeast, which forced the vessel dangerously close to the breaking waves along the shoals of Cape Cod. The ship was eventually driven aground at what today is Marconi Beach at Wellfleet, Massachusetts. At midnight she hit a sandbar, bow first in 16 feet (5 m) of water about 500 feet (152 m) from shore. Pummeled by 70 mph (110 km/h) winds and 30-to-40 ft (9-to-12 m) waves, the main mast snapped, pulling the ship into about 30 ft (9 m) of water, where she violently capsized, sending over 4.5 short tons (4.1 tonnes) of silver and gold, more than 60 cannons and 144 people to the ocean floor. The 60+ cannon on board ripped through the overturned decks of the ship and quickly broke her apart, scattering parts of the ship, 102 human bodies, and thousands of objects over a 4-mile (6.4 km) length of coast. One of the two surviving members of Bellamy's crew, Thomas Davis, testified in his subsequent trial that "In a quarter of an hour after the ship struck, the Mainmast was carried by the board, and in the Morning she was beat to pieces."

By morning, hundreds of Cape Cod's notorious wreckers (locally known as "moon-cussers") were already plundering the remains. Hearing of the shipwreck, governor Samuel Shute dispatched Captain Cyprian Southack, a local salvager and cartographer, to recover "Money, Bullion, Treasure, Goods and Merchandizes taken out of the said Ship." When Southack reached the wreck on 3 May, he found that part of the ship was still visible breaching the water's surface, but that much of the ship's wreckage was scattered along more than 4 miles (6.4 km) of shoreline. On a map that he made of the wreck site, Southack reported that he had buried 102 of the 144 Whydah Gally crew and captives lost in the sinking (though technically they were buried by the town coroner, who surprised Southack by handing him the bill and demanding payment).

Mary Anne was also wrecked, ten miles south at Pochet Island. According to surviving members of the crew at the time of her sinking, Whydah Gally carried from four and a half to five tons of silver, gold, gold dust, and jewelry, which had been divided equally into 180 50-pound (23 kg) sacks and stored in-between the ship's decks. Though Southack did salvage some nearly worthless items from the ship, little of the massive treasure hoard was recovered. Southack wrote in his account of his findings, that, "The riches, with the guns, would be buried in the sand." With that, the exact location of the ship, its riches and its guns were lost, and came to be thought of as nothing more than legend.

== Survivors ==
Of the 146 souls aboard Whydah Gally, only two men—the ship's pilot, 16-year-old Miskito Indian John Julian, and Welsh carpenter Thomas Davis—are known to have made it to the beach alive. All seven of Bellamy's men on board Mary Anne survived, as did Mary Anne's three original crewmen. Including the seven men aboard Mary Anne, nine of Bellamy's crew survived the wrecking of the two ships. They were all quickly captured by Justice Joseph Doane and his posse and locked up in Barnstable Gaol. On 18 October 1717, six were tried in Boston for piracy and robbery. The following were found guilty and sentenced to death by hanging: John Brown of Jamaica, Thomas Baker and Hendrick Quintor of the Netherlands; Peter Cornelius Hoof of Sweden; John Shaun of France; and Simon van der Vorst of New York.

Carpenters Thomas South and Thomas Davis, who were tried separately, had been conscripted by Bellamy—forced to choose between a life of piracy or death. Therefore, they were acquitted of all charges and spared the gallows. John Julian was not tried, but instead was sold as a slave (to the great-grandfather of John Quincy Adams) after his capture and finally hanged 16 years later.

On 15 November 1717, the famous Puritan minister Cotton Mather accompanied the six condemned men as they were rowed across Boston Harbor to Charlestown. All six men confessed and repented in the presence of Mather, but they were still hanged.

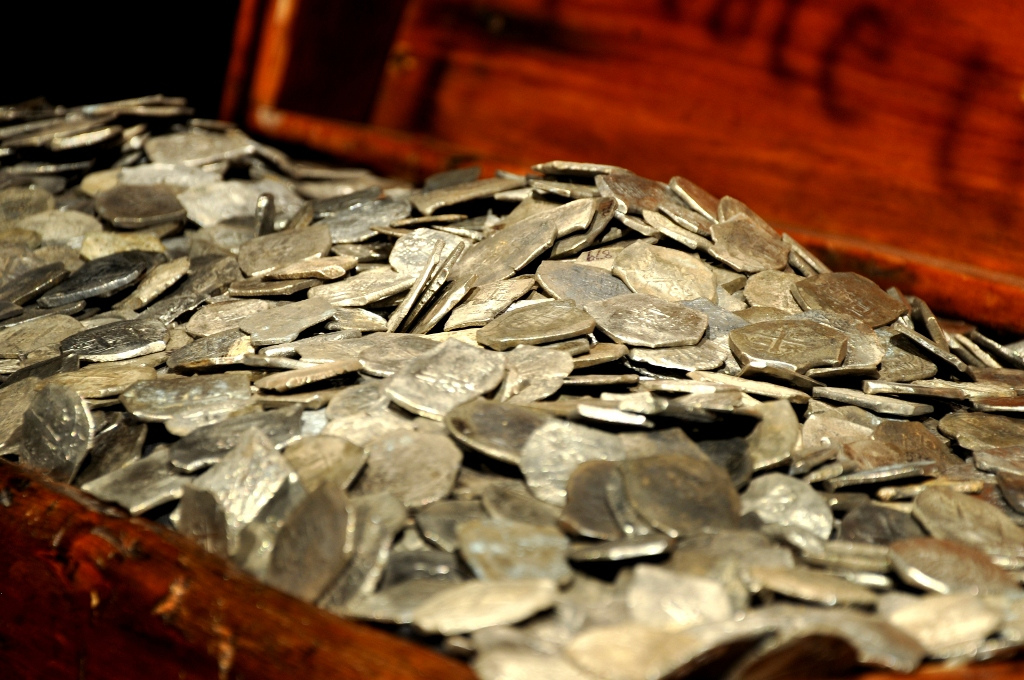
Silver from the pirate ship Whydah Gally. "The riches, with the guns, would be buried in the sand."

== Recovery ==
Barry Clifford found the Whydah Gally's wreck in 1984, relying heavily on Southack's 1717 map of the wreck site—a modern-day, true-to-life "pirate treasure map" leading to what was at that time a discovery of unprecedented proportions. That Whydah Gally had eluded discovery for over 260 years became even more surprising when the wreck was found under just 14 feet (4.3 m) of water and 5 feet (1.5 m) of sand.

The ship's location has been the site of extensive underwater archaeology, and more than 200,000 individual pieces have since been retrieved. One major find in the fall of 1985 was the ship's bell, inscribed with the words "THE WHYDAH GALLY 1716". With that, Whydah Gally became the first ever pirate shipwreck with its identity having been established and authenticated beyond doubt.

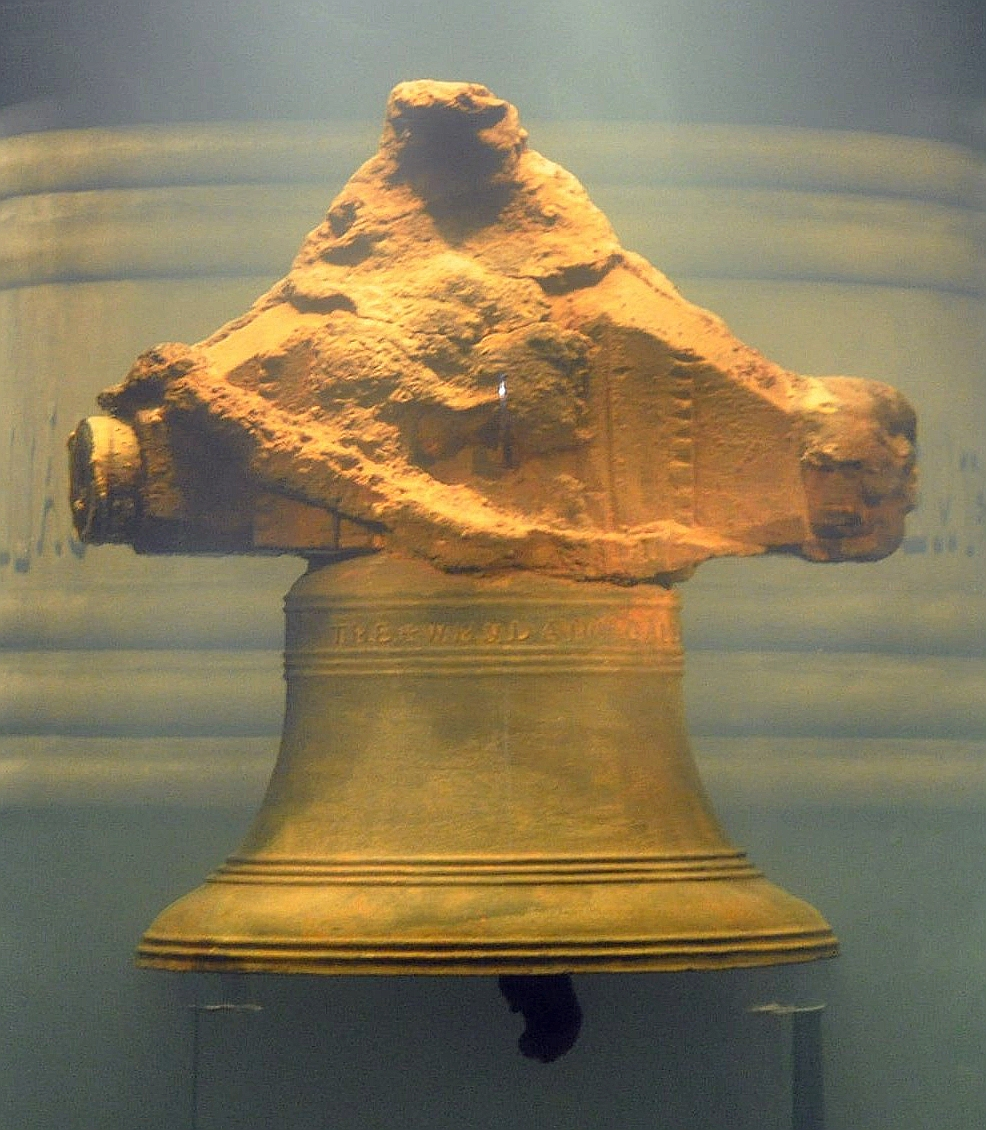
The bell, inscribed, "THE WHYDAH GALLY 1716"

Work on the site by Clifford's dive team continues on an annual basis out of Provincetown, Massachusetts. Clifford opened The Whydah Sea-Lab & Learning Center in Provincetown after discovering the wreck and the center operated on MacMillan Pier until its move in 2016. Selected artifacts from the wreck are now displayed at The Whydah Pirate Museum in West Yarmouth, Massachusetts and at Real Pirates in Salem, Massachusetts.

== Archaeological evidence ==
Famously, the youngest known member of Whydah Gally's crew was a boy by approximately 10 or 11 years old, named John King. Young John actually chose to join the crew on his own initiative the previous November, when Bellamy captured the ship on which he and his mother were passengers. He was reported to have been so insistent, that he threatened to hurt himself or his own mother if he wasn't allowed to join Bellamy. Among Whydah Gally's artifacts recovered by Clifford was a child-sized, black, leather shoe together with a silk stocking and fibula bone, later determined to be that of a child between 8 and 11 years old. His mother's account to local port authorities on what John's description was like, and especially of note, what he had been dressed in the day of his "kidnapping" by Bellamy's crew, included long silk stockings.

== Reaction ==
A museum exhibition called "Real Pirates: The Untold Story of The Whydah from Slave Ship to Pirate Ship" toured the United States from 2007 to 2014. Venues included: Cincinnati Museum Center, Cincinnati, OH; The Franklin Institute, Philadelphia, PA; The Field Museum, Chicago, IL; Nauticus, Norfolk, VA; St. Louis, MO; Houston, TX; the Science Museum of Minnesota, St. Paul, MN; and Union Station, Kansas City, MO. The venue includes videos, artifacts, educational live personal narrations to include supplementary audio programs, interactive activities, a 3/4 scale mock-up of the rear of the vessel and is supported by costumed actors portraying real-life historical pirates from the ship. A walking tour takes between 1–4 hours depending upon level of interest. The display/show is currently transitioning in preparation for exhibition in CA. In one instance Whydah Gally's brief participation in the Atlantic slave trade was a source of controversy. The Museum of Science and Industry in Tampa, Florida, announced the exhibit and linked it to the 2007 release of Pirates of the Caribbean: At World's End. After being criticized for trivializing the ship's role in slavery while glorifying its role in piracy, the museum canceled the exhibit.

On 27 May 2007, a UK documentary/reality show titled Pirate Ship ... Live! followed a team of divers, including comedian Vic Reeves, in live coverage of a dive at the Whydah Gally site.

On 7 January 2008, the National Geographic Channel aired a 2-hour documentary about the ongoing excavation of the wreck. It included detailed interviews with Clifford.

== Bibliography ==
- Cembrola, Bob. "The Whydah is for Real: An Archeological Assessment". atochagold.com. Archived from the original on 16 June 2006.
- Kinkor, Kenneth J. "The Legend of Black Sam and the Good Ship Whydah". s-t.com.
- "Pirates of the Whydah". nationalgeographic.com. National Geographic Society. Archived from the original on 22 March 2020.
