= Women in piracy =

List of women pirates

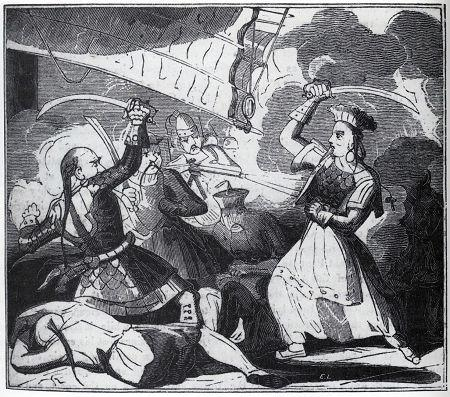
Zheng Yi Sao (1775–1844; right) as depicted in 1836

Although the majority of pirates in history have been men, there are around a hundred known examples of female pirates, (Note: The exact number differs depending on whether legendary figures are included and on how "pirate" is defined. Some scholars for instance include mythological figures such as Atalanta and privateers such as Louise Antonini (1771–1861) and Julienne David (1773–1843). Some figures once viewed as pirates, such as Charlotte Badger (1778–after 1843) have also been demonstrated to have been victims of highly fictionalized sensationalism.) about four of whom were active in the Golden Age of Piracy. Some women have been pirate captains and some have commanded entire pirate fleets. Among the most powerful pirate women were figures such as Zheng Yi Sao (1775–1844) and Huang Bamei (1906–1982), both of whom led tens of thousands of pirates.

In addition to the women that were pirates themselves, many have also historically been more heavily involved in piracy through secondary roles, interacting with pirates through being smugglers, lenders of money, purchasers of stolen goods, tavern keepers and prostitutes, and through having been family members of both pirates and victims. Some women also married pirates and turned their homes or establishments into piratical safe havens. Through women in these secondary roles, pirates were strongly supported by the agency of women. Some influential women, including monarchs such as Elizabeth I of England (r. 1558–1603), have also acted as powerful patrons of pirates. Although they have received little academic attention, women still occupy these important secondary roles in contemporary piracy. Piracy off the coast of Somalia is for instance supported to a large extent by on-shore women who participate in transportation, housing and recruitment.

Seafaring in general has historically been a highly masculine-gendered activity. On many ships in the Golden Age of Piracy, women were prohibited by the ship's contract (required to be signed by all crew members) due to being seen as bad luck and due to fears that the male crew members would fight over the women. Many famous female pirates, such as Anne Bonny (possibly died December 1733) and Mary Read (died April 1721), accordingly dressed and acted as men. Since the gender of many pirate women was only exposed after they were caught, it is possible that there were more women in piracy than is otherwise indicated by surviving sources.

In addition to historical female pirates, women in piracy have also frequently appeared in legends and folklore. The earliest legendary female pirate is perhaps Atalanta of Greek mythology, who according to legend joined the Argonauts in the years before the Trojan War. Scandinavian folklore and mythology, though the tales themselves are unverified, includes numerous female warriors (shield-maidens) who command ships and fleets. Female pirates have had varying roles in modern fiction, often reflecting cultural norms and traditions. Beginning in the 20th century, fictional pirate women have sometimes been romanticized as symbols of female liberty.

== List of named female pirates ==
Disputed historicity or legendary figure

=== Ancient pirates ===
Name	Lifespan	Active	Culture	Notes
Dido a.k.a. Elissa		~800 BC	Phoenician	The legendary founder of Carthage. Sometimes considered a pirate since her legend involves her leading a sea expedition, raids, and the kidnapping of a large group of women.
Tchiao Kuo-fu-ja a.k.a. Ch’iao K’uo Fü Jên		~600 BC	Chinese	Identified as a pirate in the cited western sources, but this appears to be a misidentification of the historical 6th-century military leader Lady of Qiaoguo. There is no record in Chinese historiography (e.g., Book of Sui) suggesting she was a pirate, nor any evidence of her activity around 600 BC.
Queen Artemisia I of Caria		480 BC	Greek	Queen of the city-state of Halicarnassus. The earliest historical female pirate, Artemisia captained a fighting ship and led the most famous pirate fleet in the Mediterranean. She participated in the second Persian invasion of Greece (480–479 BC), fighting alongside Xerxes I of the Achaemenid Empire.
Queen Teuta of the Ardiaei		231–228 BC	Illyrian	Queen regent of the Ardiaei tribe, active in the Adriatic Sea. Sanctioned a number of pirate attacks against the Roman Republic and fought against the Romans in the First Illyrian War (229–228 BC).

=== Vendel and Viking Age ===
Name	Lifespan	Active	Culture	Notes
Princess Sela		c. 420	Norwegian	Appears in the Gesta Danorum. (Note: Although there were Viking warrior women, attested both by military equipment found in the graves of women and texts describing women as among the Viking invaders, the women named in the Gesta Danorum are considered legendary and unverified on account of the unreliability of the work itself. The Gesta Danorum was written in the 12th/13th century partially as a work of royal propaganda and is not considered a reliable historical account for the centuries before its own time, though portions of it may be distorted retellings of earlier sources.) Sister of the Norwegian king Koller, with whom she quarreled, and led her own raids both in sea and land. Killed by the Jutish king-turned-pirate Aurvandill after she attempted to avenge her brother.
Alf and Alfhild a.k.a. Alvid; Altilda; Atwilda; Alvilda		c. 550	Geatish	Appears in the Gesta Danorum. Her story is akin to a fairy tale and she consequently appears to be a mythical figure. Daughter of the Geatish king Synardus. Turned to piracy to escape an enforced marriage and led an all-female pirate crew. Eventually tracked down and defeated by her intended spouse, whereafter she married him on account of his prowess in battle.
Groe		c. 550	Geatish	Appears in the Gesta Danorum. One of the women accompanying Afhild.
Stikla		8th century?	Norwegian	Appears in the Gesta Danorum. Shield-maiden and pirate who alongside her sister Rusila fought against the Norwegian ruler Olov for control of his kingdom. Defeated and killed by Olov's forces who were aided by the Danish king Harald Wartooth.
Rusila		8th century?	Norwegian	Appears in the Gesta Danorum. Sister of Stikla, fought with her against Olov and Harald.
Veborg		c. 770	Danish	Briefly mentioned in the Gesta Danorum. Longship captain who was killed in battle. Participated in the legendary Battle of Brávellir.
Hetha		c. 770	Danish	Briefly mentioned in the Gesta Danorum. Longship captain who became the ruler of Zealand. Participated in the legendary Battle of Brávellir.
Wisna		c. 770	Danish	Briefly mentioned in the Gesta Danorum. Longship captain who became a standard-bearer and lost her right hand in battle. Participated in the legendary Battle of Brávellir.
Rusla, "Red Daughter"		8th/9th century?	Norwegian	Appears in the Gesta Danorum. Sometimes conflated with Rusila but appears to be a distinct figure. Sister of the Norwegian ruler Tesondus, who had been deposed by the Danish king Omundus. Angered at the Danish conquest and her brother being content with it, she fought against both but was ultimately defeated.
Lagertha		9th century	Norwegian	Appears in the Gesta Danorum. Viking shield-maiden who accompanied and later married the legendary hero and king Ragnar Lodbrok.

=== Medieval and Renaissance pirates ===
Name	Lifespan	Active	Culture	Notes
Æthelflæd, Lady of the Mercians	c. 870–918	911	Anglo-Saxon	Ruler of Mercia. Became a military leader after her husband's death in battle against the Danes in 911. Took command of the fleets to rid the seas of the Viking raiders. Sometimes referred to as a pirate.
Joanna of Flanders, "the Flame" a.k.a. Joanna of Montfort	c. 1295–1374	1341–1347	French / Breton	Duchess of Brittany by marriage to John of Montfort. Famous and admired in Brittany for her skills as a warrior and military leader. Fought alongside her troops against the French in the War of the Breton Succession (1341–1365), at points commanding great fleets in naval battles. Sometimes referred to as a pirate.
Jeanne de Clisson, "Lioness of Brittany" a.k.a. Jeanne de Belleville	1300–1359	1343–1350s	French / Breton	French/Breton noblewoman. Turned to piracy to avenge her husband Olivier IV de Clisson. who was executed as a traitor during the War of the Breton Succession. Purchased three ships, which she commanded, and attacked French ships off the coast of Normandy. Ended her pirate career after she remarried to the English knight Walter Bentley in the 1350s.
Elise Eskilsdotter	d. 1483	1455–1470s	Norwegian	Norwegian noblewoman who turned to piracy to avenge her husband Olav Nilsson. Attacked ships in the seas near Bergen.
Grace O'Malley a.k.a. Gráinne Ní Mháille, Granuaile	c. 1530–1603	16th century	Irish	Daughter of a local chieftain in Connacht. Her family ran both a legitimate shipping business and a piracy business. Inherited her father's lands (Umhaill), becoming a powerful Irish ruler. With her three ships and two hundred men, O'Malley plundered ships both from England and from other parts of Ireland. She became so prolific that Queen Elizabeth I put a bounty on her head and considered sending the royal fleet against her. Captured by the English in 1577 but released in a hostage exchange and continued to engage in piracy. Entered into English service as a privateer in 1593.
Sayyida al Hurra	1485–1561	1515–1542	Moroccan	Ruler of the western coasts of Morocco for over thirty years and a powerful Barbary corsair, operating out of Tétouan. Allied with the Ottoman corsair Oruç Reis, who operated out of Algiers. Raided Christian ships from Spain, regaining wealth her family had lost during the expulsions of Muslims from Spain. Much of the wealth was used to revive Tétouan. Earned the title al-Hurra (the free woman) and later married Ahmed el Outassi, Sultan of Morocco. Wishing to retain her political influence, she forced Outassi to travel to Tétouan for the wedding, the only time in Moroccan history a royal wedding was not held in the capital.
Mary Wolverston, Lady Killigrew a.k.a. Elizabeth Killigrew; Old Lady Killigrew	fl. 1525–1587	16th century	English	Daughter of the pirate Philip Wolverston, who educated her in piracy in her youth. Married into the Cornish Killigrew family, owners of Arwenack. Among other businesses, the Killigrews ran a criminal enterprise of seizing ships, hiding stolen goods, and bribing officials to look the other way. Wolverston was actively involved in the family's piracy. In 1582, she led crews on her own pirate attacks against a Spanish and then a German ship. Wolverston was thereafter imprisoned and sentenced to death by Queen Elizabeth I but was ultimately pardoned.
Dorothy Monk, Lady Killigrew		16th century	English	Daughter-in-law of Mary Wolverston. Also charged with having engaged in piracy.
Elizabetha Patrickson	fl. 1634	17th century	English	Raided English ships alongside her husband William. Indicted on piracy, robbery, and murder charges on 10 March 1634 in an English court. She was tortured into a confession and later hanged.

=== Golden Age of Piracy ===
Name	Lifespan	Active	Culture	Notes
Charlotte de Berry	1636–?	17th century	English	Reportedly kidnapped and forced to go to sea, whereafter she organized a mutiny, took control of the ship and began a pirate career of her own. She is likely fictional since her earliest known mention in a literary work dates to 1836.
Jacquotte Delahaye	fl. 1656	Mid-17th century	Haitian or Spanish	Legendary pirate whose story differs between accounts, sometimes said to have been motivated by revenge and other times said to have wished to earn wealth to support her family. Supposedly rose to command a hundred pirates. Depending on the account said to have either continuously dressed as a man or to have taken a male alias after faking her death. Likely fictional as she first appears only in accounts written significantly later than her purported lifespan.
Christina Anna Skytte	1643–1677	1657–1668	Swedish	A baroness who is said to in 1657 have joined her brother Gustav Skytte, who secretly owned a pirate ship. Together they assaulted ships in the Baltic Sea. Fled the country to escape the authorities in 1663 but returned and retired from piracy in 1668. Her role in the piracy is somewhat disputed since the relevant court documents (which confirm the piracy of her brother and fiancé) do not explicitly mention her.
Neel Cuyper a.k.a. Cornelia; Nellie Cowper; Santa Rubia	c. 1655–1695	Late 17th century	Dutch	Served on Dutch merchant ships masquerading as a man. Captured by pirates who recruited her on account of her experience. After some time with the pirates, Cuyper was discovered to be a woman, whereafter she was disembarked together with her share of the loot at Tortuga. Later founded a resort for pirates at Labadee in Haiti, eventually becoming known as the "Queen of Labadee Bay". Killed during a 1695 raid by English and Spanish forces.
Mrs. Beare	fl. 1684–1689	Late 17th century	English or Jamaican	Full name unknown. Wife of the pirate John Phillip Beare, Mrs. Beare, originally from Jamaica. She joined him on pirate voyages, frequently donning men's clothing. She is described as a woman with a promiscuous reputation.
Anne Dieu-le-Veut	1661–1710	Late 17th century	French	According to legends the wife of the Dutch pirate Laurens de Graaf, whom she is said to have accompanied on pirate raids. Her legend conflicts with known historical information on Laurens de Graaf's life; although documentary evidence confirms her as a real person, she only married de Graaf after he is believed to have left his pirate life behind him.
Ingela Gathenhielm	1692–1729	1711–1721	Swedish	Married the shipowner and privateer Lars Gathenhielm, who also operated a pirate business. Ingela was deeply involved in her husband's business and took charge of it after Lars died in 1718.
Maria Lindsey		1740s–1760s	English	Prostitute who married the pirate Eric Cobham. Thought to have been insane, she joined Cobham and they assembled a pirate crew together. They conducted pirate attacks together in New England and Newfoundland; Cobham's memoirs portray Lindsey as ruthless in how she dealt with captives.
Anne Bonny a.k.a. Ann Fulford	d. 1733	1720	English	Primarily known through Captain Charles Johnson's 1724 book A General History of the Pyrates; though much of her story is of uncertain veracity, contemporary records confirm her existence and that she was convicted for piracy. According to limited documentation, Bonny joined the pirate John Rackham in 1720. Also part of Rackham's crew was another female pirate, Mary Read. Captured and convicted in late 1720 but escaped execution through claiming to be pregnant. She likely died in Jamaica in 1733.
Mary Read	d. 1721	1720	English	Primarily known through Captain Charles Johnson's 1724 book A General History of the Pyrates; though much of her story is of uncertain veracity, contemporary records confirm her existence and that she was convicted for piracy. According to Johnson's story, she turned to piracy after a ship she was on was captured by pirates. Joined the crew of John Rackham in 1720, of which Anne Bonny was also part. Captured and convicted in late 1720 but escaped execution through claiming to be pregnant. Died in prison around April 1721, perhaps related to childbirth complications.
Martha Farley a.k.a. Mary Farley; Mary Harvey; Mary Farlee	fl. 1726	Early 18th century	English?	Tried for piracy in Virginia alongside three men in 1726; whereas all men were executed, Farley was spared by the court. Though Farley does not appear to have taken an active militant role alongside the men, she was present during at least one capture of a ship and is thought to have aided in eavesdropping on the conversations of the prisoners.
Mary Critchett a.k.a. Mary Crickett; Mary Crichett	fl. 1729	Early 18th century	English	Tried for piracy in Virginia alongside a crew of five men in 1729 and executed. Critchett and the others had been felons who escaped and stole a ship in the Rappahannock River before making their way into the Chesapeake Bay, where they captured another ship.
Martha Herring	fl. 1714–1735	1714–1715	English?	Daughter of a captain killed in 1714 a mutiny by her lover Sandy Gordon, who turned to piracy. Herring continued to follow Gordon aboard the Flying Scot. Gordon was killed in 1715 and Herring then stayed behind on the island on which the two were married.
Flora Burn	fl. 1741	18th century	American	She served as one of the 35 sailors aboard the American privateer ship, HMS Revenge, during the year 1741. The ship was operating on the eastern coast of North America. She held a one-and-three-quarter share of the bounty within the crew.

=== 18th–19th centuries ===
Name	Lifespan	Active	Culture	Notes
Sarah Bishop	c. 1759 - c. 1809	1778–1780	American	Bishop was captured by a British privateer ship during a raiding party in 1778 and became a crew member. Her duties included standing watch, handling the ship's wheel, and performing sexual services. She became the captain's wife, and after two years in captivity, managed to escape by going overboard. Later, she became a hermit in Ridgefield, Connecticut.
Rachel Wall	c. 1760–1789	1781–1782/1789	American	One of the most notorious American pirates and perhaps the earliest female pirate to be born in America itself. Partook in the capture and plunder of several ships in 1781–1782 through luring them with false distress. Sole survivor after her ship came under attack and thereafter ostensibly retired from piracy. Alleged to have continued to rob ships during the night. Imprisoned and then hanged in 1789 after she assaulted a woman and stole her bonnet.
Zheng Yi Sao a.k.a. Ching Shih; Cheng I Sao	1775–1844	1801–1810	Chinese	Wife of the pirate Zheng Yi. Participated in his piracy from the time of their marriage in 1801 onwards. After her husband's death in 1807, she took command of his powerful Red Flag Fleet and dominated the South China Sea both militarily and politically. Enforced various pirate codes, including making the rape of female captives punishable by death. At the height of her power in 1805 she commanded 400 junks and between 40,000 and 60,000 pirates. After facing significant opposition from government authorities as well as major powers such as the East India Company and the Portuguese Empire she surrendered in 1810 and was allowed to retire in peace.
Jossabee	fl. 1804	Early 19th century	Algerian	Mentioned by the French author H. Mesnik in his book Les femmes pirates (1804), wherein he claimed to have lived with her for a time.
Margaret Jordan a.k.a. Margaret Croke	fl. 1809	Early 19th century	Irish	Wife of the pirate Edward Jordan. Tried for piracy and murder following a violent dispute with investors over the schooner The Three Sisters. Found innocent and released by the court so that she could care for her children. Despite this it is almost certain that she assisted her husband in his piracy, and thus was a pirate herself.
Lucia Allen a.k.a. Lucie; Lucille; Señora del Norte	fl. 1821	Early 19th century	American	Friend and perhaps mistress of the pirate captain Pierre Lafitte. Recorded to have accompanied Lafitte on a pirate voyage and raid in the summer of 1821. May have died in childbirth in November that year.
Johanna Hård a.k.a. Johanna Jungberg	1789–1851	1823	Swedish	In popular remembrance considered the last Swedish pirate. Lived on Vrångö Island and was the widow of a bookkeeper. Lived by smuggling and running a speakeasy. Accused of piracy in 1823, Hård was found not guilty and the veracity of the accusation remains unknown.
Ng Akew a.k.a. Aku	fl. 1849	19th century	Chinese	Part of the crew of an American gunpowder and opium-trader ship Ruparell, having been purchased as a slave by its captain James Bridges Endicott. Known for a series of events in 1849 when she personally smuggled opium and acted as the representative of a pirate fleet to negotiate with Captain Lockyer of the British navy ship HMS Medea.
Eliza Welsh	1806–after 1871	Middle 19th century	Spanish	Lived with a Captain Graham aboard HMS Devonshire who became a pirate. Welsh accompanied him and partook in his piracies. Captured by the British navy, whereafter Graham was hanged in London and Welsh was placed in a prison camp in Tasmania, where she spent twenty years.
Sadie Farrell, "Sadie the Goat"	fl. 1869	1850s–1869s	Irish American	River pirate who led the Charlton Street Gang in the rivers surrounding New York City, raiding ships, villages and small towns and flying a Jolly Roger flag. She earned her nickname before becoming a pirate; it derived from her strategy to headbutt people in the stomach, whereafter one of her male companions would rob the now grounded victim.

=== 20th century ===
Name	Lifespan	Active	Culture	Notes
Lo Hon-cho a.k.a. Lo Honcho		1921–1922	Chinese	Took charge of a pirate fleet after her husband's death in 1921, probably in her mid-20s. Earned a ruthless reputation through her attacks in the region surrounding Beihai. Commanded 64 junks at the height of her power. Captured by the Chinese military in October 1922.
Lai Choi San a.k.a. Lai Sho Sz’en	fl. 1931–1939	1920s–1930s	Chinese	Active in the South China Sea and the East China Sea, commanded 12 junks. Her historicity, or at least the historicity of her exploits, are disputed since she is mainly known from the report I Sailed with Pirates (1931) by Aleko Lilius, a journalist of dubious repute. She appears to have been a real figure since she is also mentioned in a later report by a war journalist during the Sino-Japanese War.
Tan Chin Chiao, "Golden Grace" a.k.a. T'ang Ch'ên Ch'iao	fl. 1935	Early 20th century	Chinese	Also called the "Queen of the Pirates". Commanded several pirate ships, arrested in Daya Bay in 1935. Recorded as having proclaimed herself the "mortal enemy of the West".
P’en Ch’ih Ch’iko	fl. 1936	Early 20th century	Chinese	Commanded over a hundred pirates in 1936.
Ki Ming a.k.a. King Mi; Ching Mi		Early 20th century	Chinese	Attacked and tried to seize the RMS Empress of Canada in Manila, aided by a gang of her crewmembers hidden among the steerage passengers.
Huang Bamei, "Two Guns" a.k.a. Huang P’ei-mei; Huang P'emei	1906–1982	1931–1951	Chinese	Active along the coasts of the Zhejiang and Jiangsu provinces in the 1930s. Her gang, among other local criminal gangs, was recruited by the National Revolutionary Army of the Republic of China at the outbreak of the Second Sino-Japanese War in 1937, although she was of dubious allegiance. Huang's fleet grew considerably during the war; at her height she commanded 50,000 pirates and 70 ships. After the war she returned to piracy, raiding around Lake Tai. Recruited by the military again in 1949 to fight in the Chinese Civil War. Largely retired from maritime activities in 1951.
Sister Ping	1949–2014	1970s–1990s	Chinese	Operated out of Guangzhou as an owner and financer of pirate ships in the South China Sea. Also known for smuggling Chinese immigrants into the United States and Europe. Was convicted in the United States and sentenced to 35 years in prison.
Linda		20th century	Filipino	Full name unknown. Pirate responsible for several raids along the Philippine coasts, encountered by the French sailor Frances Guillain.
Susan Frani		1990s	Filipino	Member of the pirate crew of Emilio Changco, with whom she had an intimate relationship. Perhaps the sole female member of the crew. The Changco crew operated in the 1980s and 1990s and hijacked numerous ships in Philippine waters.

== Pirate women in fiction ==
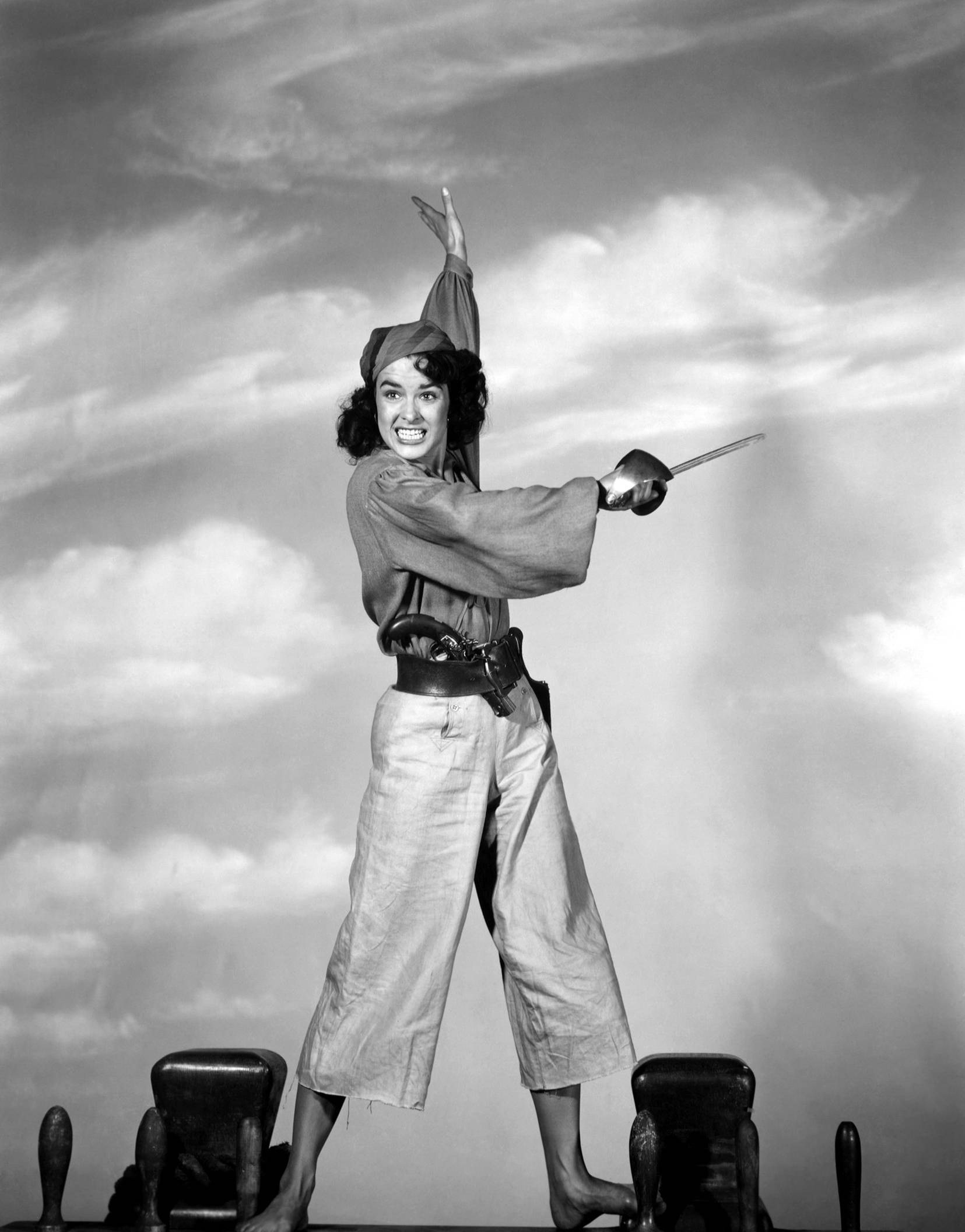
Jean Peters as the fictional pirate Anne Providence in Anne of the Indies (1951)

Historical fictional depictions of pirate women have often reflected stereotypes of their times concerning not only women but also women in power. Depictions of female pirates in A General History of the Pyrates (1724) for instance showcase a degree of unease. Illustrations in a Dutch 1725 edition of the book depict female pirates as unpleasant and bare-chested, trampling on figures representing justice and commerce. Pirate fiction grew increasingly popular in the mid-18th century and among the many tales written were novels starring female pirates. Several such narratives with women pirates and warriors were often highly formulaic, with the women going to sea or war in order to either win or regain the affection of a man. Some tales saw female pirates exceeding their male counterparts in courage, skill and virtue. Some works, such as Fanny Campbell, the Female Pirate Captain (1844), include great adventures but also ended with the central woman finding a man and settling down, perhaps an attempt to not conflict too much with traditional notions of femininity.

In the 20th century, fictional pirate women sometimes became symbols of feminism and female liberty; whereas male pirates were often used to tell stories of escape from wage slavery, female pirates illustrated escape from gender subordination. Such romanticization of pirates, whether male or female, is not grounded in history since pirates were typically violent criminals, thieves and murderers. An early work in this tradition is F. Tennyson Jesse's Moonraker (1927), wherein the pirate captain Lovel is revealed to be a woman with strong ideals on female liberty. Still, there also continued to be stories wherein women were seduced by pirates, such as the 1944 film Frenchman's Creek, and films wherein female pirates seduced men, such as Anne of the Indies (1951). Anne Providence, the main character of Anne of the Indies, was the first famous female pirate in film.

The female pirate is sometimes cast as a feminist, or even an anarchist, icon. Ulrike Ottinger's 1978 film Madame X: An Absolute Ruler is about several women from different career backgrounds joining the pirate crew of "Madame X" above the Chinese ship Orlando and was inspired by the Chinese pirate women of the early 20th century. Among the various messages of the film were a critique of patriarchal and hierarchical power structures. Disney's Pirates of the Caribbean film series includes several female pirates, most notably Elizabeth Swann. Although Swann is included in some stereotypical scenes and begins as the Governor's daughter and a damsel in distress, she is turned into a courageous pirate and heroine over the course of the film series. Swann and Anamaria are depicted in Pirates of the Caribbean as cross-dressing, recalling real historical pirate women who did the same. The fourth film introduced Angelica, a former love interest of Jack Sparrow and the daughter of Edward Teach / Blackbeard, who grows up at a Spanish convent until she learned the art of the con from Sparrow, and corrupted her as she grows up to be an accomplished sailor and a dangerous pirate.

The 2026 swashbuckler action thriller film The Bluff features a retired Caribbean pirate battling her former crewmates to protect her family.

== See also ==
- Feminist school of criminology
- Gender and crime
- List of pirates
- Piracy
- Pirate code
