= Red Legs Greaves =

Scottish–Barbadian pirate in the 1670s

- Born: 1649; Barbados
- Died: Unknown
- Occupation: Buccaneer
- Years active: 1670s
- Known for: Escape from prison during an earthquake
- Piratical career
- Base of operations: Caribbean and the West Indies

"Red Legs" Greaves was allegedly a Scottish-Barbadian buccaneer active in the Caribbean and the West Indies during the 1670s. His nickname came from the term Redlegs used to refer to the class of poor whites who lived on colonial Barbados.

Although considered a successful pirate during his alleged career, most notably his raid of Margarita Island in the mid-1670s, he is best known for his escape from prison during an earthquake.

His story does not appear in historical records of the era and he may have been fictional.

== Authenticity ==
Greaves’ story does not appear in period accounts of Margarita, pirate trials, or other documents. It first appears in A. Hyatt Verrill's 1923 In the Wake of the Buccaneers, but no sources are cited. Verrill included Greaves in several of his later books, and Philip Gosse repeated the story in his Pirates' Who's Who (1924). Verrill travelled widely in the West Indies, and conceivably came across this story, perhaps as a folk tale traveledor local legend, but he also has a reputation for fictionalizing and inventing material. Verrill's and Gosse's works appeared only two years after Rafael Sabatini’s popular novel Captain Blood, and Gosse’s description of Greaves parallels Sabatini's Captain Blood closely.

== The early life of Greaves ==
Greaves' parents had been tried for treason for their participation during the Wars of the Three Kingdoms and were sent into servitude, as were many Royalists and Covenanters. He is thought to have been born in 1649 in Barbados.

Born a short time after his parents' arrival in Barbados, Greaves became the servant of a kindly master. However, his parents and master died a short time after another, and the orphaned boy was sold to another man who was claimed to have been violent and to have often beaten Greaves as a teenager.

== Piratical career ==
During this time, concerned for his survival, he attempted to escape his servitude and successfully managed to swim across Carlisle Bay, stowing away on a ship preparing to leave Barbados. Although he assumed the vessel was a merchant ship on its way to a far-off port, the ship was actually a pirate ship commanded by a Captain Hawkins. Hawkins was known throughout the Caribbean as an unusually cruel pirate, often torturing captives, especially women, and rarely showing mercy to the crews of ships he attacked. Although feared by his crew, he was respected and very successful in capturing rich prizes.

After being discovered on board, Greaves was given the option of signing with the crew "offering the articles on a platter along with a pistol". Although reluctant to join the crew under force, Greaves showed promise and quickly gained a reputation as a capable and efficient sailor.

However, he soon grew to resent and hate Captain Hawkins, both for being forced into his crew as for his distaste for brutality towards captured prisoners. The two eventually fought a duel, often claimed to be over the torture of a prisoner, although it is more likely Hawkins attacked Greaves for failing to obey his orders. During the fight, Greaves killed Hawkins and was elected by the crew to succeed Hawkins as captain.

== Captain Greaves ==
Accepting their request, Greaves rewrote the Ship's Articles, specifically prohibiting the mistreatment of prisoners and allowing the surrender of merchant captains during battle. Throughout the decade, Greaves found great success as well as gaining a reputation as an honorable captain widely known for his humane treatment of prisoners and never participating in the raiding of poor coastal villages.

Around 1675, he captured Margarita Island off the coast of Venezuela. After capturing the local Spanish fleet, he turned their guns against the island's coastal defenses and successfully stormed the town. After taking a large number of pearls and gold, he soon left without further looting the town or harming the inhabitants.

== Capture and escape ==
After the raid, Greaves was able to retire from piracy and settled down to the life of a gentleman farmer in Nevis. However, after being recognized by one of his former victims, he was turned into authorities to collect the reward offered for his capture.

Greaves was found guilty of piracy, and despite his reputation, no leniency was shown towards him. He was sentenced to be hanged in chains. While imprisoned in the prison dungeon to await his execution, the town was submerged by an earthquake. Greaves was one of the few survivors and was eventually picked up by a whaling ship. Some stories of Greaves describe his escape from prison in Port Royal, Jamaica, which was damaged by an earthquake and tidal wave in 1692. Other accounts claim he had been imprisoned on Nevis, which is alternately describes as suffering its own earthquake and tidal wave in either 1680 or 1690.

In gratitude, he joined the crew of the whaling ship and later became a pirate hunter, eventually earning a royal pardon for his efforts in the capture of a pirate ship which had been raiding local whaling fleets. After his pardon, he again retired to a plantation and became known as a philanthropist in his later years, donating much of his wealth to various island charities and public works before his death of natural causes.

== See also ==
- William Lewis, John Cornelius, Alexandre Bras-de-Fer, Charlotte de Berry, Maria Lindsey, and Louis Le Golif - other likely fictional pirates.
- Henry Avery
