= Golif =

Golif may refer to:

- Golif 21, a French sailboat design
- Louis Le Golif, a fictional French pirate
