= Redlegs (disambiguation) =

Redlegs are the class of poor whites who lived on the colonial Barbados, St. Vincent, Grenada, and other Caribbean islands.

Redlegs may also refer to:

- The Cincinnati Reds baseball team from 1953 to 1958
- Members of the Field Artillery in the United States Army, from the red trouser stripe formerly part of the Artillery uniform
- Unionist guerrillas who were headquartered at Lawrence, Kansas, during the American Civil War - see Jayhawker
- The Norwood Football Club, an Australian rules football club in the South Australian National Football League
- The Dandenong Football Netball Club, an Australian rules football club in the Southern Football Netball League
- The Perth Football Club, an Australian rules football club in the West Australian Football League
- Red Legs Greaves, a pirate who is noted for his humane treatment of prisoners
- The Redshank (Persicaria maculosa), a perennial plant from the Knotweed family
- Common name for Wood turtles, a North America turtle
- Common name for Bothriochloa macra, a grass species
