= Flora Burn =

Flora Burn was an American female pirate, who engaged in piracy in the year 1741 and operated on the East Coast of North America.

== Life and piracy ==
On June 2, 1741, Governor Richard Ward of Rhode Island, grants Captain Benjamin Norton a privateering commission, empowering him to undertake aggressive actions against Spanish vessels and commodities. The vessels name is HMS Revenge. Flora Burns is listed among thirty-five sailors of the American privateer ship during its voyage off the American coast in 1741. Her role within the ship is listed as Sailor.

While a member of the privateer crew, she was granted a one-and-three-quarter share, consistent with the allocation for all other sailors. In contrast, the commander, Benjamin Norton, held a two-and-a-half share. The total shares of the ship is 55.
