= Cristobal's Gold =

- Directed by: Jean Stelli; Jacques Becker
- Written by: Albert t'Serstevens (novel); Carl Koch; Jean Renoir
- Starring: Charles Vanel; Conchita Montenegro; Albert Préjean
- Cinematography: Jean Bourgoin; Willy Faktorovitch; Nicolas Hayer
- Edited by: Marguerite Renoir
- Music by: Jean Wiener
- Production company: Les Films Béril
- Distributed by: Société Nouvelle des Films Dispa
- Release date: 22 April 1940
- Running time: 80 minutes
- Country: France
- Language: French

Cristobal's Gold (French: L'or du Cristobal) is a 1940 French drama film directed by Jean Stelli and Jacques Becker and starring Charles Vanel, Conchita Montenegro and Albert Préjean. Jean Renoir helped the original director, Jacques Becker, prepare the film and worked on the script, before Becker quit after three weeks and was replaced by Jean Stelli. The film is based on a novel by Albert t'Serstevens. It was shot at the Boulogne Studios in Paris and the Victorine Studios in Nice with location shooting taking place around Villefranche-sur-Mer. The film's sets were designed by the art director Eugène Lourié.

== Synopsis ==
Off the coast of South America, a gang of criminals led by a former police officer plans to seize the ship Cristobal carrying a cargo of gold bullion.

== Cast ==
- Charles Vanel as Le Coronel, le chef de la police
- Conchita Montenegro as La Rubia
- Albert Préjean as Dupuy
- Jim Gérald as Un pirate
- Dita Parlo as Lisbeth
- Guillaume de Sax as Le capitaine
- Georges Péclet as Philippe
- Roger Legris as Le râleur
- Jacques Tarride as Le médecin
- Jean Heuzé as Le lieutenant Saunier
- Léon Larive as Le cuistot
- Frédéric Mariotti as Un marin
- Tony Murcie as Kériadec
- Louis Robert as Un marin
- Paul Temps as L'ingénieur

== Bibliography ==
- Durgnat, Raymond. Jean Renoir. University of California Press, 1974.
