= Princess Sela =

Norwegian pirate

Princess Sela (active c. 400–420 A.D.) was a possibly fictional Norwegian pirate and one of the first known female pirates. Sela was said to be a princess of Norway (although her alleged lifetime far predates the effective forming of that land) and the sister of the King Koller of Norway. The Danish historian Saxo Grammaticus, living 600 or more years after her possible time, described Sela as a "skilled warrior and experienced in rowing."

Stories say that Sela and her brother hated each other and when Koller became King, Sela decided to become a pirate. She attacked many ships in the North Atlantic ocean, amassing a reputation and a substantial amount of treasure.

Princess Sela's brother King Koller decided that his rival, Horwendill, the former King of Jutland who turned to piracy, was receiving too much glory and had to be killed. Koller led his fleet into battle with Horwendil. Horwendil then killed Koller, and then later had to kill Sela to end the war.

== See also ==
- Rusla
- Women in piracy
