= Marie Hartig Kendall =

American photographer (1854–1943)

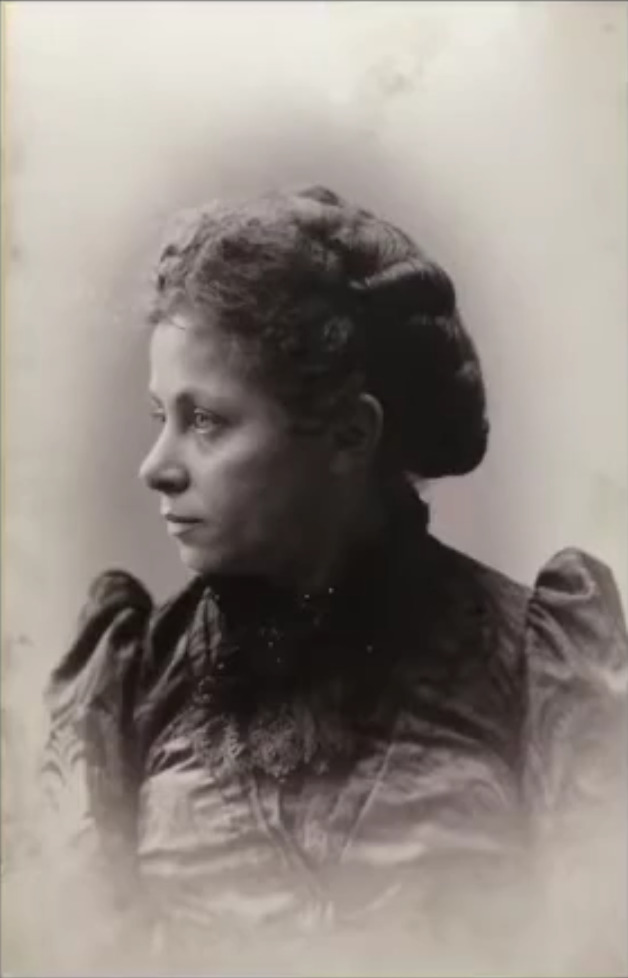
- Self-portrait of Marie Hartig Kendall
- Born: Marie Hartig; 1854; Mulhouse, Alsace, France
- Died: 1943 (aged 88–89); Norfolk, Connecticut, U.S.
- Known for: Photography
- Awards: World's Columbian Exposition medal (1893)

Marie Hartig Kendall (1854–1943) was an American photographer. Her portrait photography and landscapes documented the Norfolk, Connecticut, area in the late 19th and early 20th centuries. Born in the Alsace region of France, she immigrated to the United States with her family and trained as a nurse at Bellevue Hospital in New York. A self-taught photographer, during her lifetime Kendall made over 30,000 photographic negatives after first acquiring a view camera in the 1880s. She won an award for photography at the 1893 World's Columbian Exposition. She sold her photographs as postcards and to the New Haven Railroad for their publicity campaigns. Among her photographs were some depicting the Great Blizzard of 1888.

== Early life, education and family ==
Marie Hartig was born in 1854 in Mulhouse, France, where her family owned both shoe and cotton factories. Following the Franco-Prussian War, when their homeland was ceded to German rule, they immigrated to the United States, arriving in New York City in 1871. She requested of her family that she lead an independent life; alongside her sister, she enrolled in a training program for nurses at Bellevue Hospital.

At Bellevue she met an intern, John Calvin Kendall (1847-1921), a native of Ridgefield, Connecticut. The two were engaged, and possibly due to a rule against nurse-doctor relationships, Marie left Bellevue, completing her nursing training at Charity Hospital on Blackwell's Island (now Roosevelt Island). She married Kendall in a civil ceremony in 1877. According to family lore, she refused to have a wedding ring, deeming it a symbol of women's enslavement and suggested that a watch would "be more suitable". They moved to Norwalk, Connecticut, and started a family. Their first three children were Karolina (also Lena, born 1880), Helen (born 1881), and Cyrus (born 1882). Their eldest, Lena, was maimed in a scalding accident and died before her second birthday. Claude was born in 1884 and it was not until 1899 that their fifth child, Karolina (Kay) was born.

== Move to Norfolk and photography ==
The Kendalls moved to Norfolk, Connecticut, in 1884. John Kendall had been a colleague of physician William H. Welch, and was invited to join the medical practice of his father, William Wickham Welch. The family lived in one of the Welch homesteads. Unable to afford a trip to Hartford to arrange professional portraits of their children, Marie purchased a view camera with money she earned by sewing and knitting garments. She set up her own darkroom and taught herself to use the camera. She proceeded to create portraits of her children and was soon selling portraits to her friends and neighbors. She purchased a flash for $100 that allowed her to take photographs indoors.

In addition to her portraiture, Kendall took many outdoor photographs, depicting landscapes, blooming flowers, waterfalls, and country scenes of Litchfield County. Her photographs captured the townsfolk of Norfolk as well as the many events and the buildings of the area, including a tennis tournament, the Eldridge Gymnasium, and the Norfolk Library. Kendall only used platinum-coated paper for her prints. Among her photographs were depictions of extreme weather events. During the Great Blizzard of 1888, she hauled her camera, tripod and glass plates around Norfolk to document the historic snowfall. She also photographed the aftermath of the ice storm of 1898. During a trip to New York City, Kendall photographed the Bethesda Fountain.

Kendall entered camera club competitions and submitted three framed collections of her photography for the 1893 World's Columbian Exposition in Chicago. Her work was displayed in the Women's Pavilion and she was awarded a bronze medal for her photograph of a locomotive in motion. She was the only woman to receive an award for photography. The judges were also impressed by her photograph of trailing arbutus and a set of photographs where she triple exposed single glass-plate negatives depicting children or animals.

Inspired by a booklet from the Columbian Exposition, Kendall later produced the 1900 Glimpses of Norfolk that included photographs of summer homes as a souvenir for visitors. She also made a similar booklet for Ridgefield, Connecticut. To augment her family's income, she sold sets of postcards depicting pastoral scenes in Connecticut. The New Haven Railroad used her photographs in their publicity campaigns. Kendall's work was also exhibited at the Louisiana Purchase Exhibition in St. Louis in 1904.

Aside from her photography business, Kendall also ran a boarding house called Edgewood Lodge, a sewing school and taught nutrition to local families. Kendall was active in the temperance movement and the women's suffrage movement.

Sometime after World War I, Kendall destroyed some 30,000 of the glass-plate negatives she had accumulated, selling the glass for one cent a piece and only preserving around 500 of them. Kendall died in Norfolk in 1943.

== Gallery ==
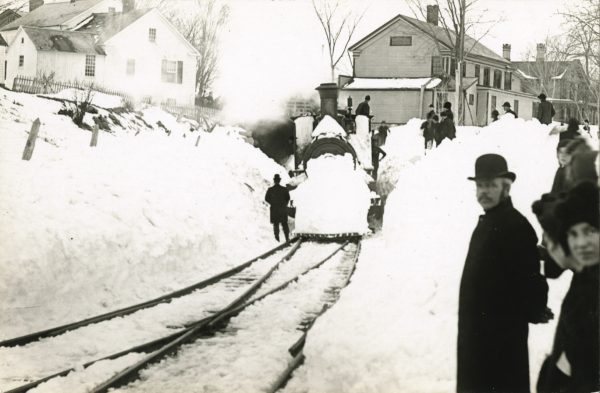
Great Blizzard of 1888

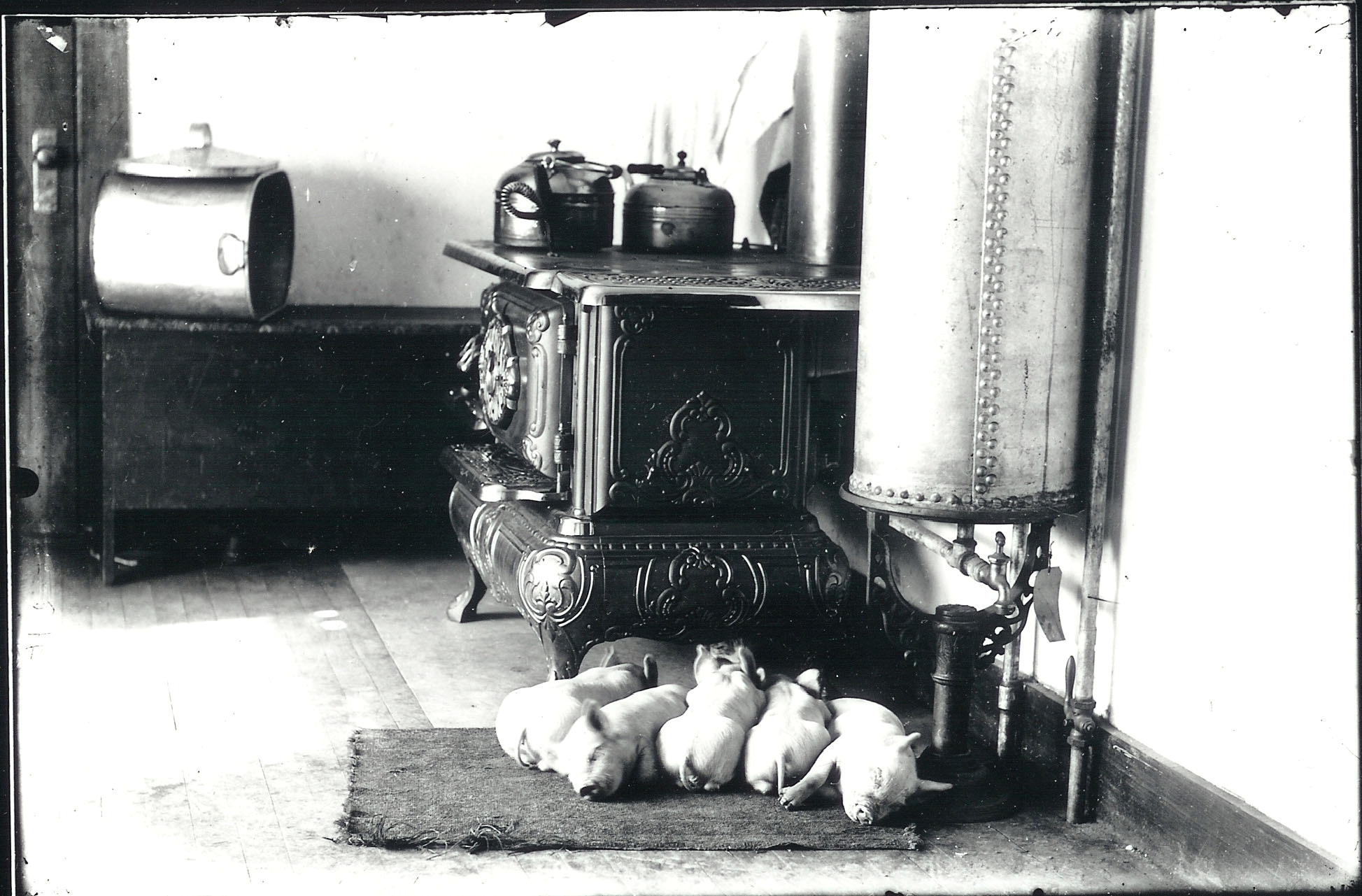
Orphaned piglets

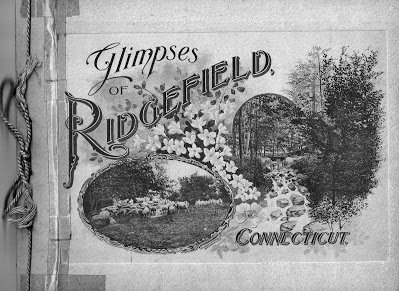
Glimpses of Ridgefield

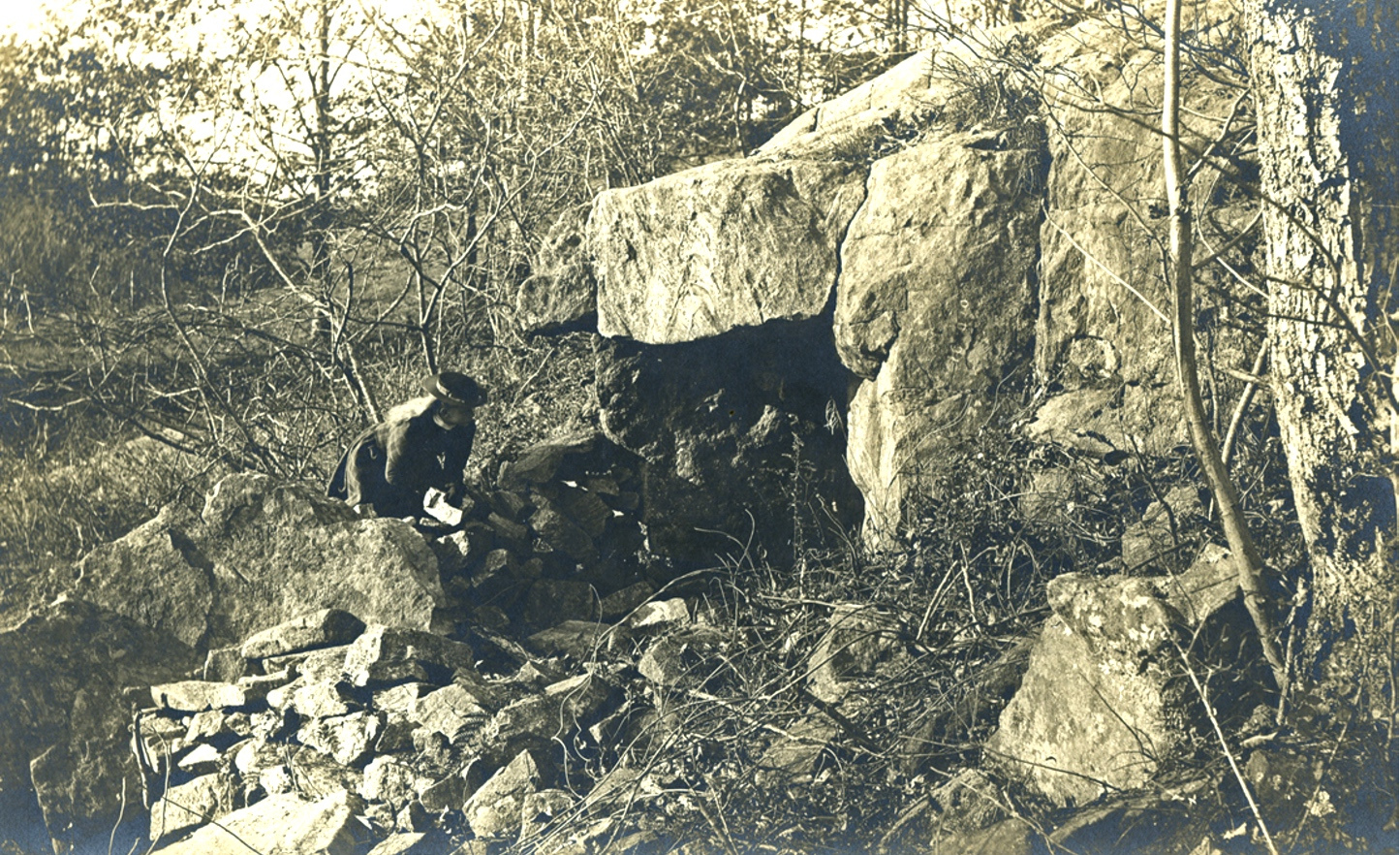
Sarah Bishop's cave

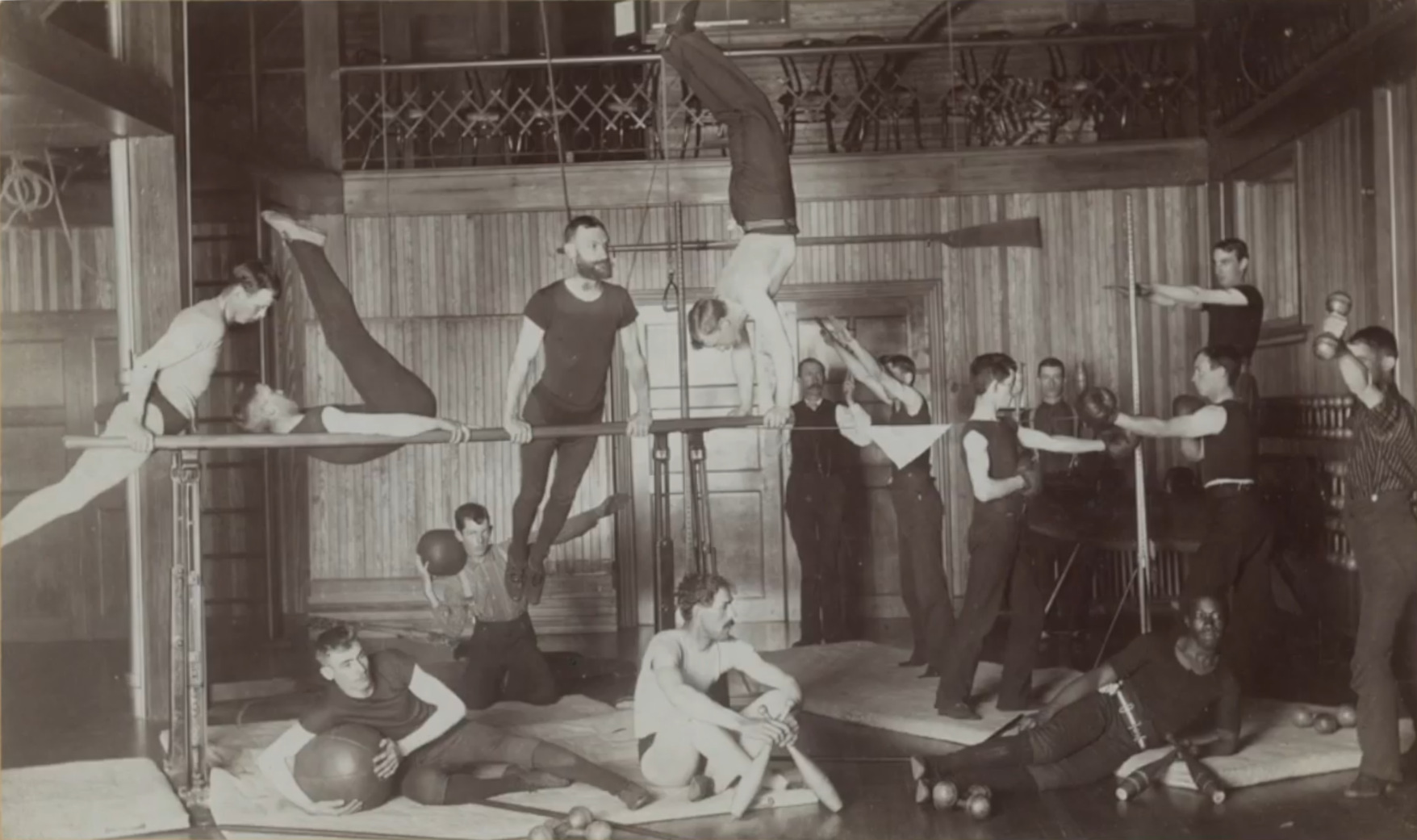
Men at the Eldridge Gymnasium

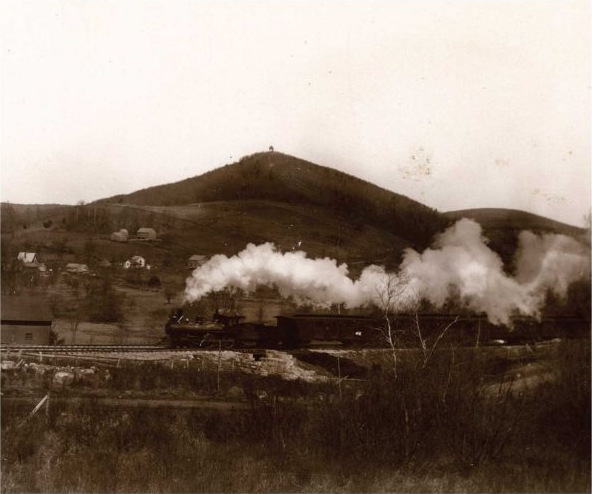
Locomotive near Norfolk

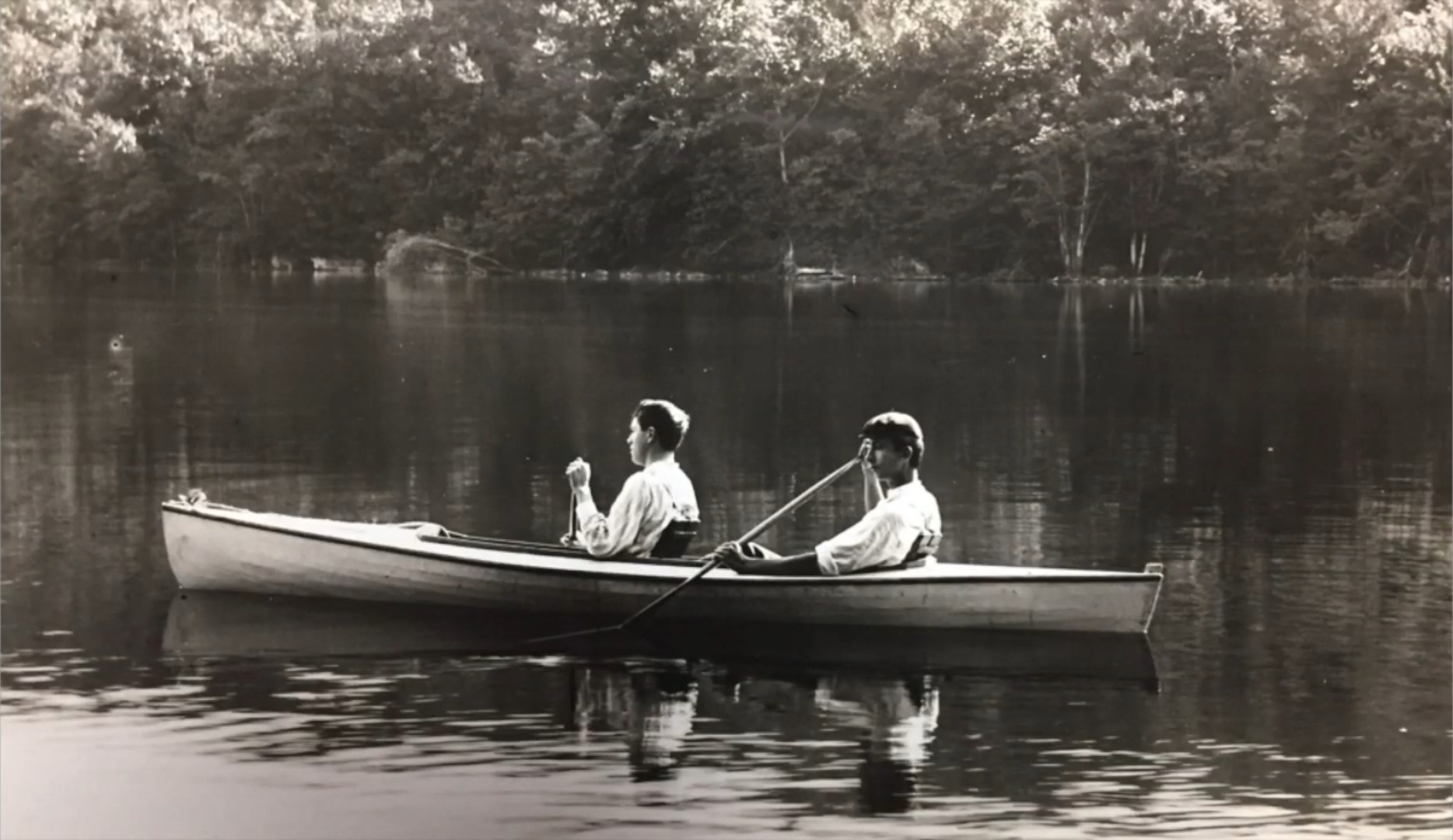
Canoeists

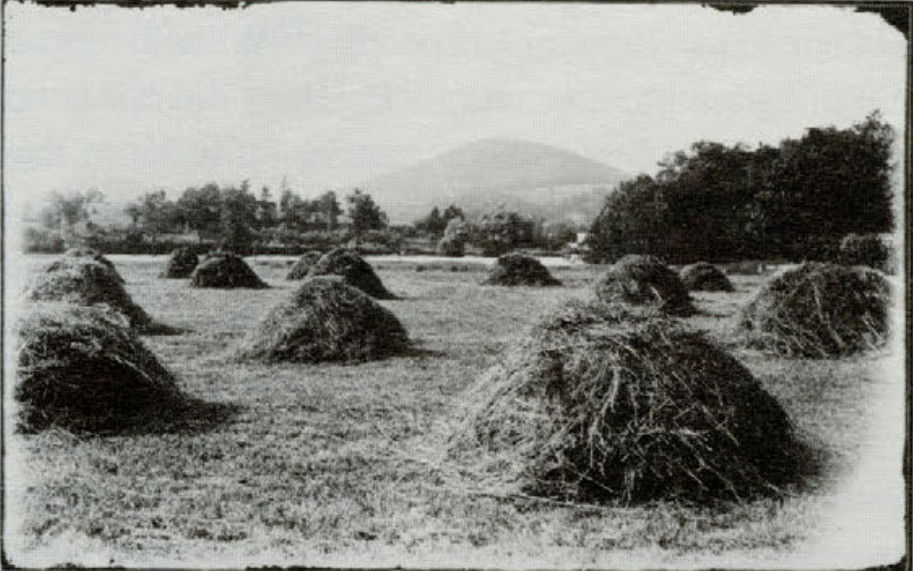
Haycocks with Haystack Mountain

== Legacy ==
Kendall's photographs were used extensively in Theron Wilmot Crissey's 1900 History of Norfolk.

The Norfolk Historical Society holds over 3000 of Kendall's prints, hundreds of glass-plate negatives, and photo albums she put together. Kendall's photography was featured in the 2013 Connecticut Historical Society exhibition Through a Different Lens: Three Connecticut Women Photographers. She was the subject of a 2018 exhibition by the Norfolk Historical Society, Artistic Taste and Marked Skill: The Photography of Marie H. Kendall, the same year that the historical society published the accompanying book A Remarkable Legacy: The Photographs of Marie Hartig Kendall.
