= Golif 21 =

Sailboat class

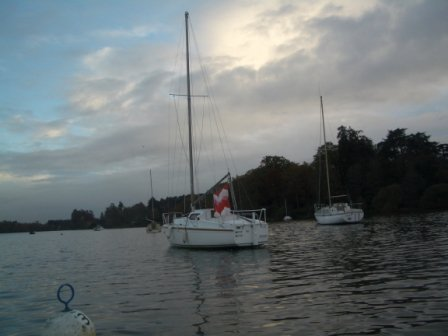

Development
- Designer: P. Jouët & Cie
- Location: France
- Year: 1961
- No. built: 997
- Builder: Jouët
- Role: Cruiser

Boat
- Displacement: 2,866 lb (1,300 kg)
- Draft: 3.67 ft (1.12 m)

Hull
- Type: monohull
- Construction: fiberglass
- LOA: 21.32 ft (6.50 m)
- LWL: 16.42 ft (5.00 m)
- Beam: 7.41 ft (2.26 m)
- Engine: outboard motor

Hull appendages
- Keel: fin keel
- Ballast: 1,058 lb (480 kg)
- Rudder: transom-mounted rudder

Rig
- Rig type: Bermuda rig
- I foretriangle height: 27.25 ft (8.31 m)
- J foretriangle base: 8.50 ft (2.59 m)
- P mainsail luff: 25.16 ft (7.67 m)
- E mainsail foot: 9.25 ft (2.82 m)

Sails
- Sailplan: fractional rigged sloop
- Mainsail area: 116.37 sq ft (10.811 m^{2})
- Jib/genoa area: 115.81 sq ft (10.759 m^{2})
- Total sail area: 232.18 sq ft (21.570 m^{2})

Racing
- PHRF: 264

The Golif 21, or just Golif, is a French trailerable sailboat that was designed by P. Jouët & Cie as a pocket cruiser. It was named for the fictional pirate, Louis Le Golif and first built in 1961.

== Production ==
The design was built by Jouët in France from 1961 to 1967, with 997 boats completed, but it is now out of production. It was also imported into the United States. At the time of the Golif 21 production Jouët was an independent company, although it was bought out and absorbed into Yachting France in 1970.

== Design ==
The Golif 21 is a recreational keelboat, built predominantly of fiberglass, with wood trim. It has a fractional sloop rig, a spooned raked stem, a slightly angled transom, a transom-hung rudder controlled by a tiller and a fixed fin keel. It displaces 2,886 lb (1,309 kg) and carries 1,058 lb (480 kg) of iron ballast.

The design incorporates a number of unusual innovations including an automotive-style, wrap-around front cabin windshield and a cabin ventilation system that includes a self-draining, air-water separator chamber in the bow.

The boat has a draft of 3.67 ft (1.12 m) with the standard keel.

The boat is normally fitted with a small 3 to 6 hp (2 to 4 kW) transom well-mounted outboard motor for docking and maneuvering.

The design has sleeping accommodation for four people, with a double "V"-berth in the bow cabin and two long straight settee berths in the main cabin. The galley is located on both sides just aft of the bow cabin. The galley is equipped with a slide-out stove and a sink. The head is located in the bow cabin under the "V"-berth. Cabin headroom is 60 in (150 cm).

For sailing downwind the design may be equipped with a symmetrical spinnaker.

The design has a PHRF racing average handicap of 264 and a hull speed of 5.9 kn (10.9 km/h).

== Operational history ==
The boat is supported by an active class club, the Golif Owners.

In a 2010 review Steve Henkel wrote, "best features: The motor well, built into the aft end of the cockpit directly ahead of the outboard rudder, helps make steering under power more responsive. The heavy keel, relatively narrow beam and long waterline, and high-aspect sailplan all add up to a comfortable sea boat (if there can be such a thing in only 21 feet of length). The unusually long quarter berths are also admirable. Worst features: The forward berths are too short and narrow at the foot for two adults."

== See also ==
- List of sailing boat types
