= Sarah Bishop (hermit) =

American pirate and hermit (c. 1759 – c. 1809)

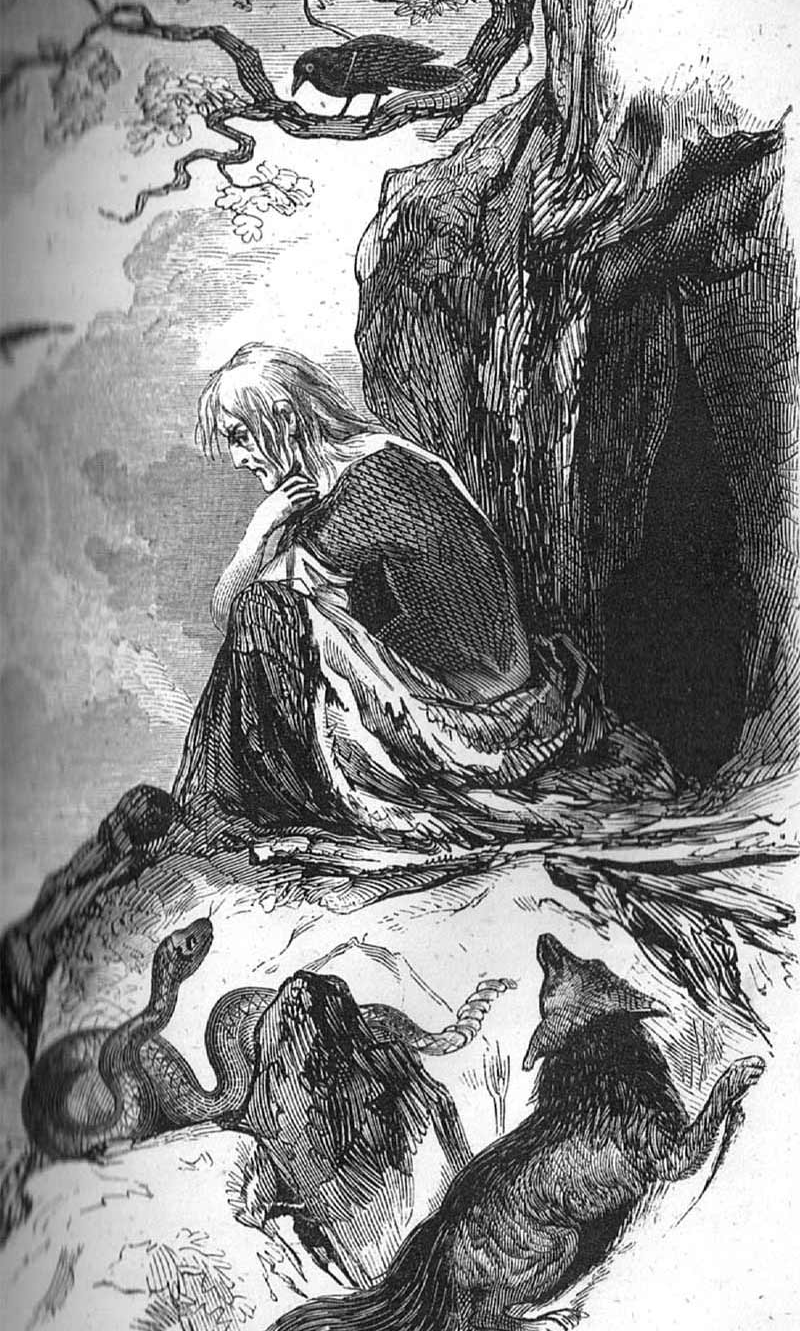
- Sarah Bishop sitting in her cave, as imagined by an unknown artist.
- Born: c. 1759; Long Island, New York, U.S.
- Died: c. 1809 (aged 49-50); Ridgefield, Connecticut, U.S.
- Resting place: June Road Cemetery (North Salem, New York)
- Known for: Well-known hermit who lived in Ridgefield, Connecticut and worked as a pirate briefly.

Sarah Bishop (c. 1759 – c. 1809) was an affluent American woman who was forced to become a female pirate during the years of 1778–1780. She escaped from the ship, swam to shore, and lived in a cave as a hermit for about thirty years until she froze to death.

== Early life ==
Sarah Bishop was born around 1759 on Long Island, New York. She led a life of privilege as a member of an affluent and well-educated family. Her appearance was described as "a lady of considerable beauty". She was in poor health.

== Life in piracy ==
During the American Revolutionary War, her family's house was burnt by a raiding party from a British privateer. She was captured by the raiding party in 1778 and carried back to their ship. She was given membership within the crew with duties attached to it. Some duties included steering the wheel, cooking and standing watch. Additionally, she was forced to participate in sexual activities with the crew.

Sarah Bishop became the wife of the captain, which put her off-limits to the crew. Eventually, the captain was killed in an engagement with an American privateer. Bishop took six months to make an escape plan, waiting for an opportune moment, and around 1780, she went overboard through the side of the ship and swam towards the shore at Stamford, Connecticut. Bishop travelled to the mountains near Ridgefield, Connecticut, and Westchester County, New York, where she took residence in a rocky cleft.

== Life as a hermit ==
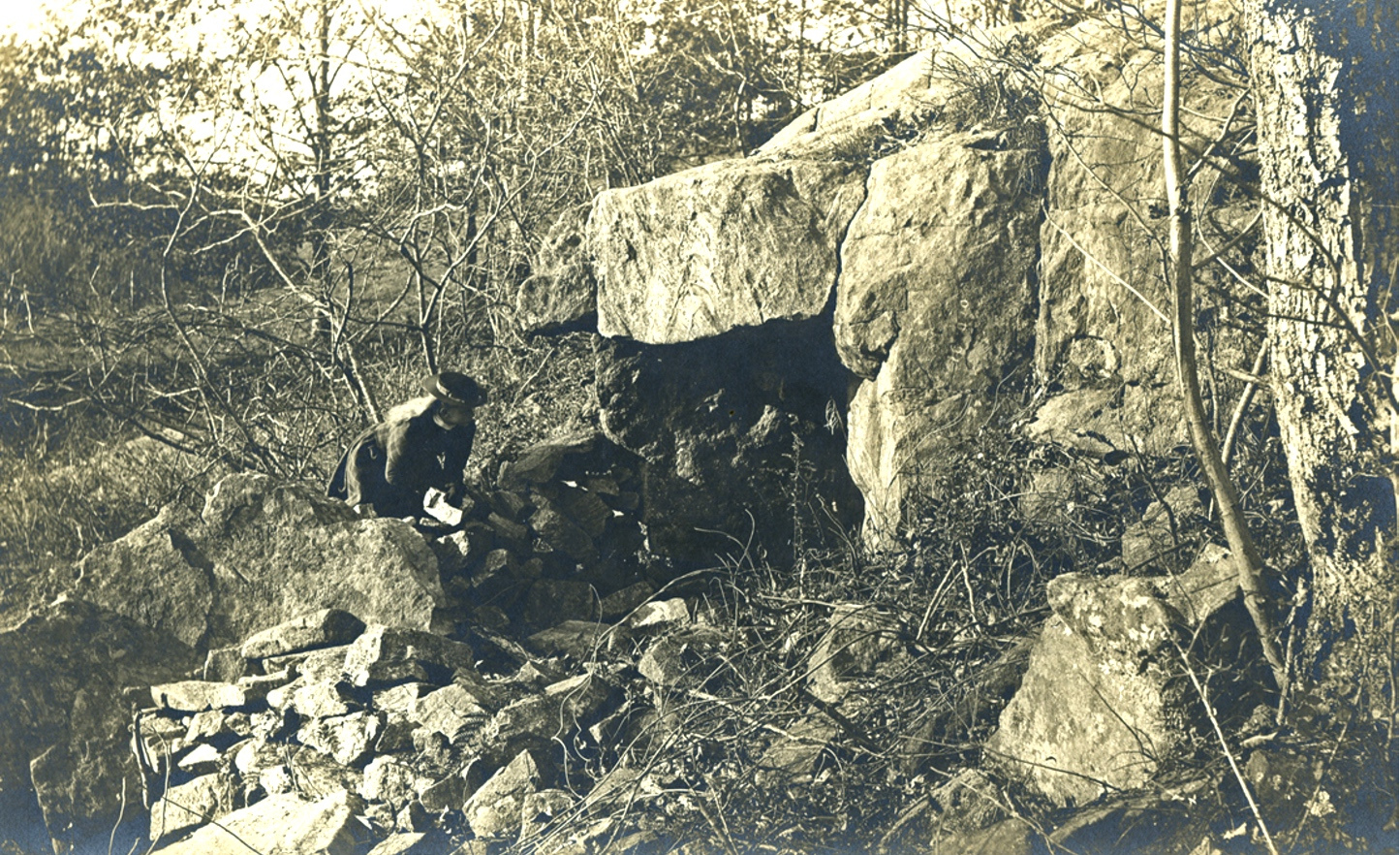
A woman peering into the cave of Sarah Bishop. Photographed in 1900 by Marie Hartig Kendall.

Sarah Bishop was a legendary figure. Some sources say she lived between North Salem and South Salem in New York. According to Betty Roberts, the Town Historian of South Salem, ''she's a mystery and I guess that makes her a bit romantic." Other sources say she lived in nearby area of West Mountain, Connecticut.

=== Lifestyle ===
Described as mentally sound and deeply devoted to her faith, her few possessions included an old pewter basin and a gourd shell for cooking. She slept on a solid rock with scattered old rags, and when a reporter visited her in 1804, her cave had no signs of food or an active fire though she had a fireplace in the corner. She had not left the cave since the snowfall. Bishop claimed to consume very little meat, relying on berries, nuts, and roots gathered from the mountains during the summer. She kept a Bible with her and spent a substantial amount of time reading and meditating on it. She made a weekly journey from her cave to attend Sunday services at the South Salem Presbyterian Church, first changing into a neater attire at a local residence. Following the service, she would switch back into her worn rags and retreat to her cave.

The land around her cave was a treeless patch covered in grass, with peach trees and beans, cucumbers, potatoes, and grapevines which extended into the nearby woods. Next to the cave was a fountain with mountain water.

=== Appearance ===
According to an 1804 newspaper article, “her dress appeared little else but one confused and shapeless mass of rags, patched together without any order”. These clothes covered everything except her head, which exposed her rich long grey hair.

According to Theodore L. Van Noden, in his unpublished 1927 book of the history of South Salem, she arrived in Connecticut close to the American Revolution and was of medium height, fairly skinned, and was elegantly charming. She wore the fashionable attire of the time, donned in a petticoat and a short gown, while carrying a bundle of garments that were both expensive and rarely seen in Salem. It was clear that she had once been attractive; her manners were refined, and her conversation revealed a worldly knowledge. Yet, she remained silent about her past, providing no details about her previous residence.

According to Samuel Goodrich, in either January 1809, 1810, or 1811, "her form had become more bent, her limbs thinner and more wasted, her hair more blanched, and her eyes more colorless."

== Death and legacy ==
Though most sources say that Sarah Bishop froze to death between 1808 and 1810, the date and circumstances of her death are contested.

In February 1809, Bishop visited a family in South Salem despite a severe snowstorm in the area. Despite their offer for her to stay the night, Sarah declined and headed towards her cave. Concern arose when she failed to return to town, prompting searchers to look for her. Her lifeless body was discovered partially up the mountain, covered in snow.

Another report says that she was found in the spring or summer standing upright, feet trapped in a frozen marsh, and yet another news article says that her lifeless body was discovered with feet trapped in the ground in September 1808. According to John Warner Barber, Bishop's death occurred in 1810 in Ridgefield. This is recorded in his book Connecticut Historical Collections, published in 1837.

=== Memorials and historical analysis ===
Her cave in the mountains became a tourist attraction in the late nineteenth century.

Bishop was buried in an unmarked grave at June Road Cemetery in North Salem, New York. In 2000, North Salem's Town Historian, Dick Yakman, oversaw the installation of a memorial stone in June Road Cemetery. He is quoted as saying "The stone is dedicated to her memory as a compassionate woman who, with unwavering determination, faced the challenges of nature and society, living the life she chose in accordance with her convictions. May her soul be blessed by God."

According to historian Linda Grant De Pauw, the experience she endured during her capture by pirates was "so traumatic that she could not bear to return to normal human society". In 1980, Scott O'Dell, who is best known for writing Island of the Blue Dolphins which also depicts an isolated woman, wrote a historical fiction novel titled Sarah Bishop based on Bishop's life.

The poem about Bishop, titled "The Hermitess," was written by Samuel Griswold Goodrich and appeared in the Connecticut Mirror on August 25, 1823, approximately 15 years after Bishop's death. The poem reads as the following:

For many a year the mountain hag Was a theme of village wonder; For she lived in a cave of the dizzy craig, Where the eagle bore his plunder. Up the beetling cliff she was seen at night, Like a ghost to glide away; And she same again at the morning light, From the forest wild and grey. And when winter came with its shrieking blast, Old Sarah no more was seen, Till the snow wreath away from the mountain passed, And the forests were waving in green. Her face was wrinkl'd, but passionless seem'd As her bosom were withered and dead; And her colorless eye like an icicle gleam'd, But no sorrow nor sympathy shed. Her long snowy locks, like the winter drift, On the wind were back ward east; And her crippl'd form glided by so swift, You had said 'twere a ghost that passed. And her house was a cave in the giddy rock, That o'erhung a sullen veil; And 'twas deeply scarred by the lightning's shock And swept by the vengeful gale. As alone on the cliff she musingly sate, The fox at her fingers would snap: The raven would sit on her snow-white pate, And the rattle-snake coil in her lap; And the vulture look'd down with a welcoming eye, As he stooped in his airy swing; And the haughty eagle hovered so nigh, As to fan her long locks with his wing. But when winter rolled dark its sullen wave From the west with gusty shock—Old Sarah, deserted, crept cold to her cave, And stept without bed in her rock. No fire illum'd her dismal den: Yet a tattered Bible she red; For she saw in the dark with a wizzard ken—And talked with the troubled dead, And 'twas said that she mutter'd a foreign name, With curses too fearful to tell; And a tale of perfidy, madness, and shame, She told to the walls of her cell. Years—years passed a way, and a stranger came To the village, with age all white—He gloomily listened to tales of the dame, And went to her desolate height. He saw her—she stood on the jutting cliff—Her hair on the wild winds breath—Yet a statue she seem'd, for her limbs were stiff, and pale in the palsy of death. Like a desolate ruin she stood on the brink, With a writhed hp and a glaring eye; And her cold clay with horror seem'd to shrink, As the stranger came shuddering nigh. He approach'd--but the hurrying gust swept on, And bore her away from his sight; And high on the craig the wild eagle alone, Attended her funeral rite.
