= Albert t'Serstevens =

Belgian novelist (1886–1974)

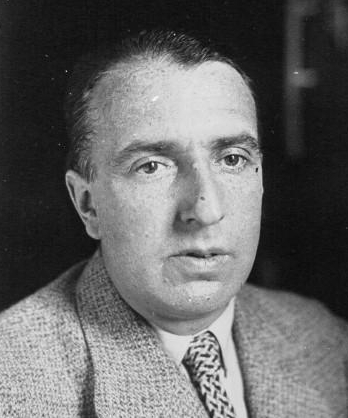
Albert Serstevens Portrait

Albert t'Serstevens (born Brussels, Belgium; 1886-1974) was a Belgian novelist who settled in France in 1910. In 1937 he gained French nationality.

== Works ==
- Un apostolat: roman, 1920
- La légende de Don Juan, 1924
- Taïa, roman contemporain, 1929
- (ed.) Voyages aux isles de l'Amérique (Antilles) 1693-1705 by Jean Baptiste Labat. 1931.
- (ed.) Le livre de Marco Polo; ou, Le devisement du monde
- Joie de plein air, editions pour la nouvelle France, 1944
- Tahiti et sa couronne, 1950–51
- La grande plantation: roman tahitien, 1952
- Cahiers de Louis Adhemar Timothée Le Golif, dit Borgnefesse, capitaine de la flibuste, 1952
- Mexique pays a trois étages, 1955. Translated as Mexico: three-storeyed land, 1957
- Les précurseurs de Marco Polo; textes intégraux établis, traduits, et commentés, 1959
- L'homme que fut Blaise Cendrars; souvenirs, 1972
