= Huang Bamei =

Chinese pirate and naval commander (1906–1982)

- 黃八妹
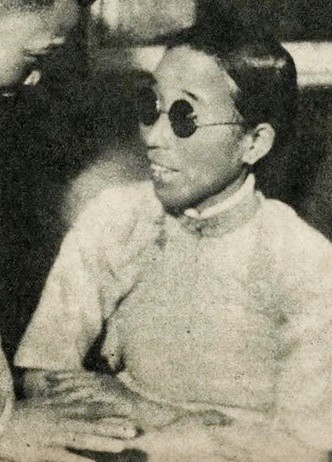
- Huang in 1938
- Born: 1906; Jinshan County, Jiangsu, China
- Died: 4 May 1982 (aged 75–76); Taipei, Taiwan
- Military career
- Allegiance: Republic of China (variable)
- Nickname: Two Guns (Note: The nickname has also been translated "Double Gun" and "Madame Two Revolvers".)

Huang Bamei (Chinese: 黃八妹; pinyin: Huáng Bāmèi; 1906 – 4 May 1982), also known as Huang P’ei-mei or Huang P'emei, was a Chinese pirate leader who served as a naval commander in the Second Sino-Japanese War (1937–1945) and the second phase of the Chinese Civil War (1945–1949), aligned with the Republic of China but at times of dubious allegiance. At the height of her power she commanded a force of 50,000 people and 70 ships and was considered the most famous pirate in China. She earned the nickname "Two Guns" owing to her use of two guns in battle.

Born near Shanghai into a poor peasant family, Huang helped her father in transporting and selling salt which only government has monopoly. She began her career in 1931, raiding along the coasts of the Jiangsu and Zhejiang provinces. Though she was arrested and sentenced to death in 1933, Huang was released from prison through the intervention of her family and their contacts among the authorities. After the outbreak of the Second Sino-Japanese War in 1937, Huang was among the local gang leaders recruited by the National Revolutionary Army Secret Services for guerrilla warfare purposes. Her loyalties throughout the war were suspect, frequently shifting between China, Japan, and various local groups as the balance of power in the war changed. From 1940 onwards she was fighting for the Nationalist Chinese army. Her participation most often amounted to pirate attacks and raids, though she also participated in battles and was in contact with the United States Office of Strategic Services. During WW 2 she saved the life of an American bomber flier to Chungking and was rewarded by US Intelligence with automatic rifles and rocket launcher.

After the end of World War II, Huang returned to transport and selling illegal salt, raiding around Lake Tai, though she was defeated by government forces. Pardoned, Huang was later recruited by the military again in 1948 to fight against the communists in the Chinese Civil War at the suggestion of Nationalist Chinese Defence Minister Yen. She launched multiple raids inside China from offshore Islands in Zhoushan. As she lost her soldiers by People Liberation Army regular forces. She aided in the defense of the Dachen Islands and Taiwan but largely shifted away from military operations. She later became an influential member of a women's organization founded by Soong Mei-ling, wife of the nationalist leader Chiang Kai-shek, and worked to take care of refugees in Taiwan. Many respected her contribution as leader of a guerilla forces outside of Shanghai and Hangzhou Bay.

== Early life ==
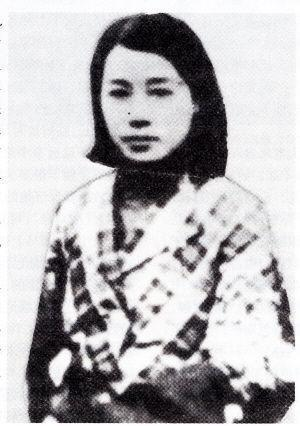
Huang in her youth

Huang Bamei was born in 1906 to a poor peasant family in Jinshan County, Jiangsu, near Shanghai. Huang had twelve siblings. Her mother's name was Huang Xiuzhu (黄秀珠). Huang's hometown was either Fuwangdai or Hehengdai. Her name was actually Cuiyun (翠雲), but she was more widely known as Bamei (八妹), which meant "eight" or "eighth sister". This nickname derived either from being the eighth daughter in the family or from having downward-sloping eyebrows that resembled the Chinese character for "eight" (八).

Huang's family was involved in smuggling and piracy. From an early age she assisted her father in transporting and selling illegally acquired smuggled salt. Her family were also businesspeople; Huang's mother owned a dram shop at which her father operated a gambling table. Huang was reportedly strong from an early age. She had started practicing with guns as early as at the age of twelve and had mastered using two guns simultaneously at the age of fifteen.

There exist several unverified stories of Huang's exploits in her childhood and youth. One such story is that Huang while still a child was to be married off to a member of the Wu family. The Wus eventually broke the marriage agreement on account of Huang's "rough character" and her nature to "attack and confront". There are also stories that exaggerate her tough character, such as a tale claiming that she was once faced with two pirate ships while at sea and defeated their crews. Additionally, there are many unverified local legends concerning sexual affairs with influential figures she was in known to have been in contact with, such as Shi Lianyuan, a salt merchant in Pinghu, and Xu Ashu, leader of the local Lake Tai gang.

== Career ==
=== 1931–1933: Local pirate ===
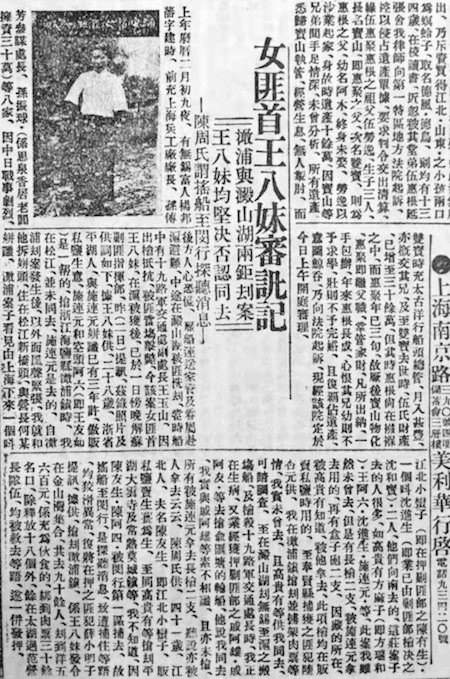
Article on Huang's 1933 arrest in Shen Bao

In 1931, Xu Ashu led a large pirate raid in Ganpu (a town by Hangzhou Bay). The local government in Jiangsu eventually defeated and captured Xu Ashu with a hastily assembled fleet. While in captivity, Ashu told the authorities that Huang and her associate Shi Lianyuan (the salt merchant) had participated in the attack and had been significant in providing the weapons used. Huang and Lianyuan escaped and hid in various places to avoid the authorities. Almost a year later in 1932, Huang emerged again as a pirate. She is recorded to have plundered, kidnapped and murdered traders and ordinary people and in one notable incident boarded a steamer and robbed the eight wealthy families on board. At this time Huang operated under the alias "Woman He-Zhang" (何張氏; Hé-Zhāng shì). She was active along the coasts of the Zhejiang and Jiangsu provinces.

Huang was captured by the local Jiangsu authorities at the Shanghai International Settlement in July 1933. Lianyuan had been with her at the time of the arrest but managed to escape the police. Huang had invented a fake persona as "Woman He-Zhang", claiming that she had a six-year-old child with her husband "Zhang Jinsheng" and was taking care of her old mother at her home, and that she had never known Lianyuan. The police quickly deduced that these were lies. A month into the investigation, Huang admitted to having lived with Lianyuan for three years and that she had been the owner of the weapons used in Xu Ashu's attack, though she denied her participation in that attack (claiming the guns had been stolen) and her involvement in any of her later attacks and plunderings. Although she never confessed to any of the charges against her, Huang was sentenced to death three weeks later. The newspaper Shen Bao published a report vilifying Huang on 3 August 1933, writing of her "extraordinary arm power" and that she was "abnormally atrocious". Despite the death sentence, Huang was soon released from prison through the aid of the district police director Shen Menglian, brother-in-law to a man named Li Tianmin, who had been contacted by Huang's mother.

After escaping death, Huang for a time had a relatively ordinary career as the manager of Li Tianmin's family's teahouse in Nanqiao.

=== 1937–1945: Sino-Japanese War ===
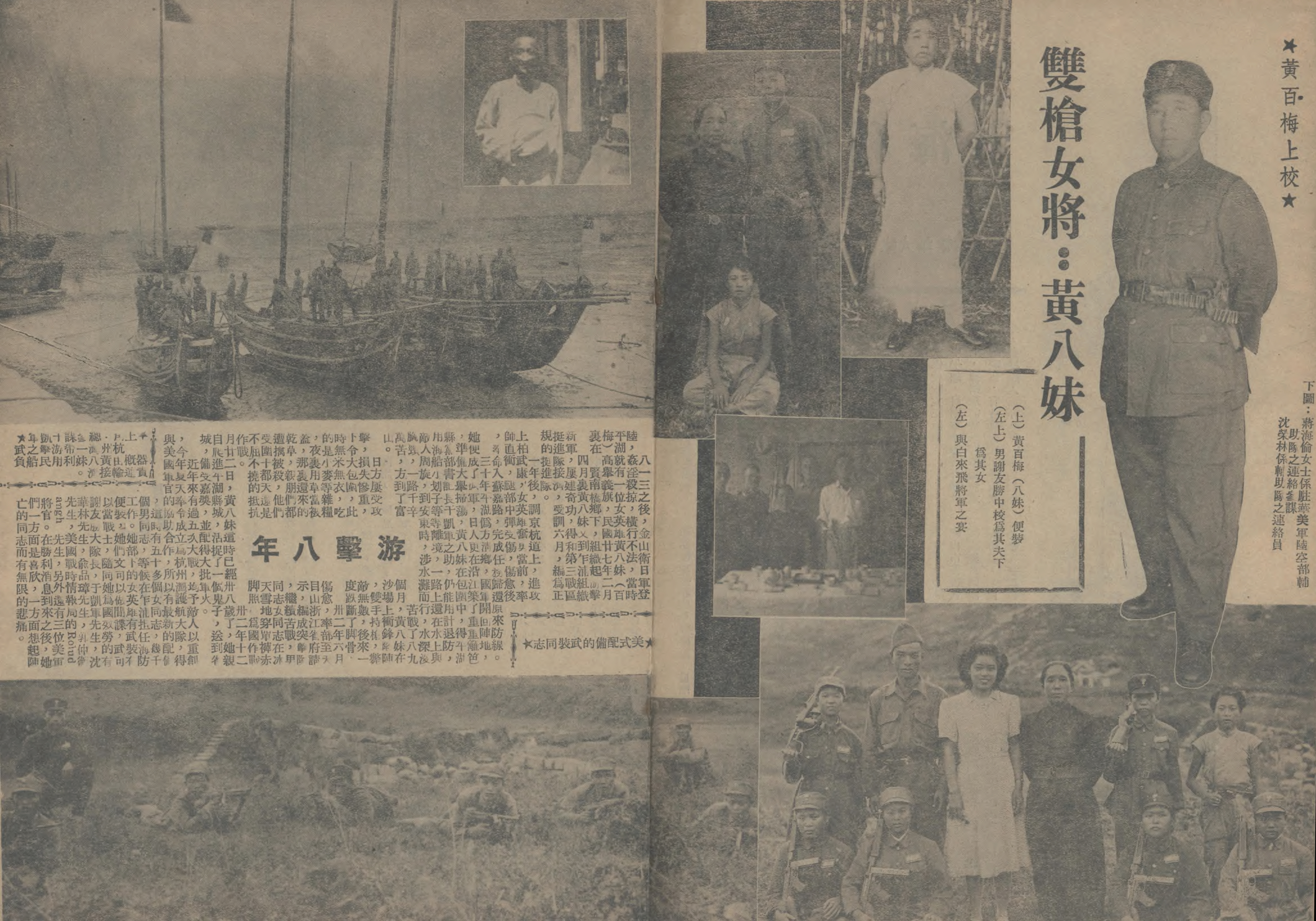
1945 Chinese propaganda article on Huang, featuring several photographs (including one of her in military uniform)

1937 marked the true beginning of Huang's piracy career. Due to the outbreak of the Second Sino-Japanese War (1937–1945) in that year, the National Revolutionary Army of the Republic of China recruited local armed gangs and groups throughout the country to employ them for guerrilla warfare purposes. Huang, owing to her criminal past, did not formally join the army but organised a group of followers and allied herself with local military forces in the Shanghai area. At some point during this time, she met her husband, Xie Yousheng, a division captain of a troop of recruited local gangsters originally from Zhapu.

Huang's loyalties in the war were considered suspect; her allegiances and alliances shifted frequently between not only China and Japan but also between local minor groups as the balance of power in the war changed. One report mentions that Huang and 6,000 subordinates were fighting for the Japanese in early 1938. Huang was captured by Japanese forces in Pudong in August 1938 and was the subject of a propaganda campaign to paint her as a traitor solely aligned with Japan. This had little effect and she was shortly thereafter free again and once again recruited by the Chinese military. In 1939, the Chinese government-aligned magazine Friends of the Wounded published an article praising Huang as a war heroine with impressive shooting skills and downplaying her criminal and suspect past. Huang earnt the nickname "Two Guns" during this time due to jumping onto enemy ships while carrying two guns.

In 1940, Huang joined the army of Mao Sen, a major Chinese intelligence leader and commander who had recently escaped Japanese imprisonment. In Sen's writings, Huang is described as "a common woman who was kind and gentle and had Buddhist beliefs", once more downplaying her career as a pirate. Sen tasked Huang and Xie, who accompanied her, to establish underground networks to monitor Japanese activities and to attempt to detect hiding enemies. Huang was assigned a growing number of troops, becoming a guerrilla commander despite objections from some that a woman should not be a wartime leader. Though her forces were undisciplined at first, they began to take shape as a fighting force after months of training. The forces under Huang, who enjoyed being called "Commander Huang", grew considerably in number. At the height of her power and influence, Huang commanded 50,000 people, had a fleet of 70 ships and was considered the most famous pirate in China.

Huang's wartime activities often amounted to pirate attacks and local communities feared her throughout the war. She also led her forces in several battles, particularly in western Zhejiang. She captured some towns in the region and expanded her control to encompass a relatively large local area. She also aided Chinese forces through escorting agents and covert operatives into Japanese-occupied Shanghai. Huang was briefly captured by the communist New Fourth Army in 1942 but released after being given a "brief education". As World War II intensified in the Pacific Ocean and the Chinese forces began cooperating with the United States, Huang was in contact with the United States Office of Strategic Services. She was assisted by the United States military and was at one point given four new pistols and eight new submachine guns by the Americans. She was sometimes promoted and publicised in Chinese propaganda.

=== 1945–1948: Interwar life ===
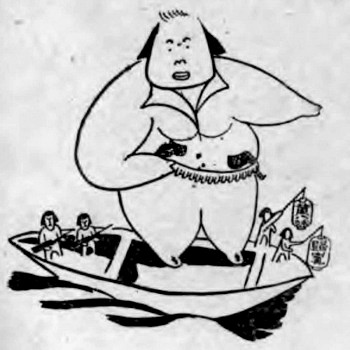
1946 newspaper illustration of Huang as a local tyrant

After the conclusion of the war with Japan in 1945, Huang was relieved of her large-scale military duties on account of the Chinese military mistrusting her. Huang returned to her hometown, where she was appointed as the leader of a minor military unit called the Pinghu Community Defense Corps. Only a few months into this role, Huang revolted against the government, bringing many of the Pinghu Community Defense Corps and a large number of weapons with her into Lake Tai and resuming her career as a pirate.

Huang raided local communities and sent her followers out on missions to assess the movements of government forces sent to suppress her. The motivation for Huang to return to piracy are unclear. In practical terms her actions differed little from how she had operated during the war. Huang was eventually defeated by government forces but was not punished for her crimes. Instead, the government spread a fake news story that she had not been present during the uprising or during the pirate attacks and that previous reports had been erroneous.

After this, Huang acquired a seaside hotel in Zhapu. Huang's hotel became a popular resort, visited by reporters, writers, diplomats and government officials. Huang also invested in real estate, opened several shops, gave talks about her battles against the Japanese during the war, and was elected as a representative to the council of Pinghu County.

=== 1948–1951: Chinese Civil War ===
Huang was once more recruited by the Chinese military in 1948, invited to join a bandit-suppression committee to help make battle preparations against Ding Xishan, a bandit-turned-commander for the communist forces. Huang was tasked to collect intelligence information and mobilise guerrilla forces in Pinghu, Haiyang and Jinshan. In 1949, Mao Sen recruited Huang and her husband to lead forces along the coasts of Jiangsu and Zhejiang. They shortly thereafter moved to the Yangshan islands, where Mao Sen made them the leaders of a new branch of his army, the Haibei Combat Corps. As commanders, Huang and Xie participated in battles and were in contact with forces on the mainland.

In March 1950, Huang and her forces defeated communist forces in battle close to Zhapu. Within a month of their victory, a renewed communist assault forced most of the nationalist forces at Yangshan to escape to Taiwan. Huang was among the last to leave, staying for a few weeks before leading the last remaining defenders to the Dachen Islands. In May 1950, she is recorded to have arrived in Taiwan to take part in the defense of the island and to help prepare a counteroffensive to retake mainland China. Huang was reported by the United Press to have stated that she considered Taiwan itself to be "unconquerable".

In between military missions, Huang also served the government in other ways. When Soong Mei-ling, wife of the nationalist leader Chiang Kai-shek, created the Chinese Women's Anticommunist and Anti-Soviet-Union Association in 1950, she invited Huang to serve on the organization's committee. As a committee member, Huang oversaw the care of orphans and widows on the Dachen Islands.

The outbreak of the Korean War (1950–1953) influenced the United States to strengthen relations with the remaining Chinese nationalist forces on Taiwan. As part of this, the Central Intelligence Agency (CIA) created a joint guerrilla warfare programme with the nationalists and began to recruit leaders in secret. Huang was one of the first approached, being contacted in 1951, but she was advised by her friends and by some government officials not to join, perhaps out of suspicion of the CIA and due to preferring to work directly with the nationalist forces.

== Later life and death ==
Japanese actress Miyuki Takakura as Huang in the Japanese film Queen of the China Sea (1959)

After Huang turned down the offer from the CIA, she largely shifted focus from maritime operations to being part of Soong Mei-ling's women's organization, though she is known to sporadically have partaken in further naval battles. In 1951 she was appointed as the Commissioner of the Zhejiang Branch of the organization. In late 1952, she is reported to have been planning a military operation of her own to go "deep into the back of the enemy" on the mainland; this operation was perhaps connected to the capture of her husband by communist forces. Both Xie and their son were executed by the communists in 1952.

Huang spent most of her time on the Dachen Islands. Since capable administrators were in short supply, she and her close followers often served as mediators in local disputes and overseers of goods and infrastructure, in addition to their roles in the women's organization. The Dachen Islands were lost to the communists in 1955, whereafter she relocated to Taiwan. Because of her prominent role on the Dachen Islands, numerous refugees on Taiwan often came to her for aid and support. Though she only received limited government support, Huang among other initiatives oversaw the foundation of an embroidery factory in Dapinglin so that the refugees could work for a living. Huang also founded a nursing home, a kindergarten and a middle school.

While in Taiwan, Huang sometimes went under the name Huang Baichi. She was sometimes depicted in Taiwanese propaganda films as a national heroine. In 1959, the Japanese film studio Shintoho produced a film based on Huang's life, Queen of the China Sea (東支那海の女傑; Higashi shinakai no joketsu), in which she was depicted as a collaborator of the Japanese navy who falls in love with a Japanese soldier and ships much of her stolen booty off to Japan. Huang was portrayed in the film by the Japanese actress Miyuki Takakura. The film caused outrage in Taiwan and Huang hired a lawyer to sue the production company behind the film, Shaw Brothers Studio, for "slandering a national heroine". The Shaw Brothers swiftly sent representatives to apologize and were eventually forgiven by Huang after they donated 50,000 New Taiwan dollars to the "righteous compatriots of Dachen".

Huang died in Taipei of an illness on 4 May 1982. Her body was moved to mainland China on 2 April 1990 and buried together with her husband Xie Yousheng. The couple has surviving descendants; Huang's grandson Xie Wick attended a ceremony in Shanghai in 2014 on the 77th anniversary of the Nanjing Massacre.

== Legacy ==
Huang is remembered as a legendary pirate leader. She has garnered a positive remembrance in both China and Taiwan, though her role and actions are cast differently. In China, Huang is remembered as an anti-Japanese heroine, ignoring her later allegiance to Taiwan and her later fights against the communists. In Taiwan, her role in the Sino-Japanese War is more neglected and she is primarily remembered as a heroine who fought against the communists in the civil war.

There are few surviving non-Chinese records and documents chronicling Huang's exploits; in her 2017 book Pirate Women, the American writer Laura Sook Duncombe pondered various possible explanations for this, including that the relevant accounts may simply be destroyed or undiscovered, or perhaps that Huang could have been a composite figure of several women, the exaggerated account of a single woman or a wholly fabricated figure. Most western authors accepted Huang as a genuine historical figure. Since the last western historical records of Huang coincided with the ascendancy of the People's Republic of China, some researchers believed that Huang had been defeated and killed by communist forces in the 1950s. Through examining contemporary newspapers and documents, the Canadian researcher Weiting Guo demonstrated the veracity of Huang's story in 2019 and brought attention to her life after the wars.
