= Louis Le Golif =

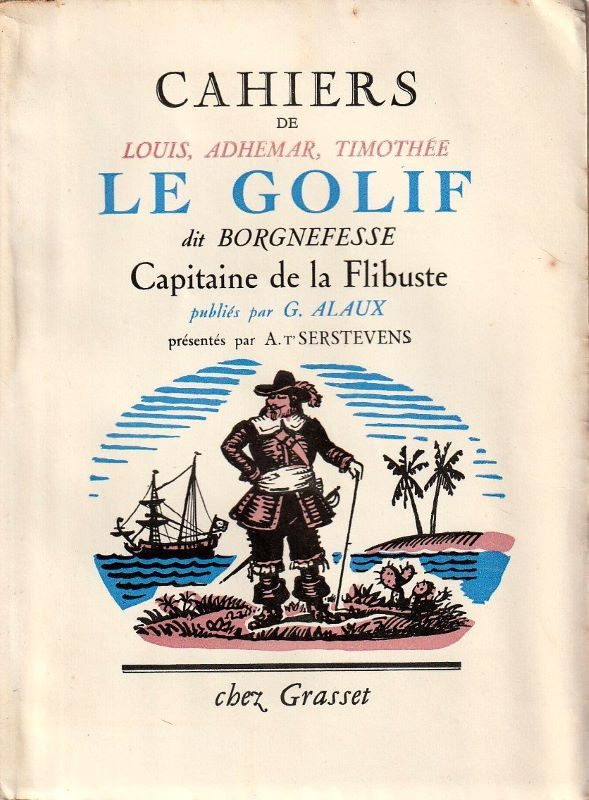
Cover of the 1952 French edition of the Memoirs of Louis Le Golif.

The Memoirs of Louis Adhemar Timothée Le Golif, called Borgnefesse, Captain of the Buccaneers (Cahiers de Louis Adhemar Timothée Le Golif, dit Borgnefesse, capitaine de la flibuste) was published in French in 1952 by Grasset.

This account of the voyages, gallant conquests, battles, boarding and pillaging of a prominent character in the Caribbean Sea during the time of Louis XIV was presented in 1952 as the authentic memoirs of 17th century freebooter captain Louis Le Golif. His manuscript, discovered by chance in an old trunk following the bombing of Saint-Malo in 1944, was deciphered by Gustave Alaux and Albert t'Serstevens. An English translation was published in 1954 as The Memoirs of a Buccaneer: Being a Wondrous and Unrepentant Account of the Prodigious Adventures and Amours of King Louis XIV’s Loyal Servant, Louis Adhemar Timothée Le Golif, Known for His Singular Wound As Borgnefesse, Captain of the Buccaneers, Told by Himself.

For a long time accepted by lovers of literature, this presentation was from the beginning rejected by historians and specialists of naval research as a forgery.

== Golif's life ==
The fictional Golif was active between 1660 and 1675. Arriving on a Tortuga plantation as an indentured servant, he escaped with a friend and joined a pirate crew. When their captain was killed attacking a Spanish treasure ship, Golif took over and successfully captured the galleon. During the battle he was struck in the buttocks by a cannonball, giving him his nickname "Borgne-Fesse" (half-ass). The pirates return to a hero's welcome given by Tortuga's Governor Bertrand d'Ogeron. After a number of other buccaneering conquests alongside Laurens de Graaf, Roc Brasiliano, and others (and after many sexual escapades), Golif retires a rich man to Brittany.

== The text ==
Analysts noted in the narrative an abundance of clichés, twists, and turns that were difficult to believe, and the reuse of elements from the true biographies of other sailors such as Duguay-Trouin or Forbin.

In addition, no historical documents record the names of Golif or Borgnefesse or of any sailor mentioned in the story. The manuscript had never been presented to inspectors, and most importantly Gustave Alaux had already published a short story entitled La Régate du capitaine Borgnefesse in the bulletin of the Nautical Circle of Chatou in 1935, nine years before the manuscript was supposedly discovered.

The supposed original text could be seen in a photo in the 1952 edition. The "manuscript" was in fact an artificially aged notebook on which the authors had written with pen and ink in a style imitating that of the seventeenth century.

In 2002, fifty years after the first edition, the manuscript was entrusted by its owners to the Musée de la Marine for its exhibition "Pirates!" devoted to the literary and cinematographic myths of Caribbean piracy, in which Golif's story is officially presented as a novel.

The Association of Friends of the Marine Museum and the magazine Neptunia (in issue no. 224) presented an article entitled The Painter of the Navy: Gustave Alaux and the Adventure of Borgnefesse.

It is now considered a fine maritime novel and appears in the compilation published by Editions Omnibus, with the agreement of the rights holders.

== See also ==
- Charlotte de Berry and Red Legs Greaves, two other pirates generally considered fictional
