= John Cornelius (pirate) =

Irish pirate

- Died: 29 August 1721; Madagascar
- Occupation: Pirate
- Years active: 1687-?
- Known for: Succeeded William Lewis
- Piratical career
- Base of operations: Red Sea and off the west coast of Africa
- Commands: Morning Star

John Cornelius (fl. 1687–1721) was an Irish pirate allegedly active in the Red Sea and off the west coast of Africa. He succeeded William Lewis, who was killed after announcing he had made a deal with the Devil. Lewis and Cornelius are likely the fictional creations of Captain Charles Johnson, who presented their stories among those of real historical pirates.

== Johnson’s creation ==
"Captain Charles Johnson" was a pseudonym, either of Nathaniel Mist, Daniel Defoe, or another early 18th-century writer. His work "A General History of the Pyrates" influenced generations of pirate scholars, researchers, and writers, though it was later found to have a number of errors. Its first volume is generally considered more historical and accurate; the second volume gives accounts of known and well-documented pirates such as Samuel Burgess and William Kidd, but includes the fictional captains William Lewis, John Cornelius, and Captain Misson. Later authors such as Grey repeated the fictional accounts nearly verbatim. There was a real captain named John Cornelius, but he was never a pirate; active 20 years after Johnson's "John Cornelius", the real John Cornelius was master of a ship captured by Samuel Bellamy, who forced several of Cornelius’ crew into piracy.

== History (purported) ==
Sometime after 1687 off the coast of Guinea, pirate William Lewis was killed in the cabin of his ship Morning Star, either by rebellious French crewmen whom he'd tried to maroon, or by superstitious sailors fearing he'd made a pact with the devil. He was succeeded by John Cornelius, his former quartermaster. Cornelius continued piracy in the region, looting English ships and releasing them while burning Portuguese ships. He attacked two slave ships, one of which fought back fiercely before it blew up. He offered to rescue the few survivors if they’d join his crew, which they accepted. He released some prisoners aboard a prize ship then stopped to careen the Morning Star.

Rounding the Cape he spotted three ships and tried to engage but his crew (of whom more than 70 had been forced into piracy) suspected they were warships and refused. Instead they sailed to Madagascar and up a river. The native King was friendly and supplied them with food and drink, but Cornelius lost dozens of men to drunkenness and disease. The natives told him that pirate John Bowen’s ship Speaker (a real pirate who died in 1704, not one of Johnson’s fictional creations) had been in the area only recently, and Cornelius left to join forces with him.

Unable to find Bowen, they sailed to the Persian Gulf and took a few ships. Stopping to careen the Morning Star, they were surprised by two Portuguese warships. They managed to escape after a close-range fight and headed for Johanna, where Cornelius planned to maroon his black slaves and sailors. One of the sailors from the slave ships he’d captured off Guinea staged a mutiny and led the ship back to Madagascar, where they lived with the local King. The Morning Star itself had become unseaworthy, and after five months living ashore, Cornelius died “and was buried with the usual Ceremony.”

== See also ==
- Libertalia – A mythical pirate kingdom founded by "Captain Misson", another fictional pirate from Volume 2 of Johnson's General History.
