= William Lewis (pirate) =

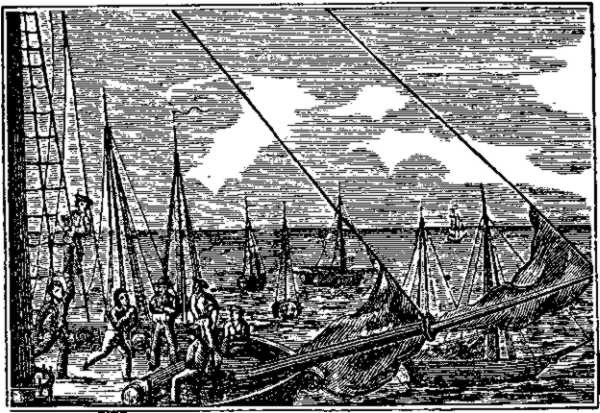
Lewis beats the cowardly master of a captured sloop who surrendered too easily.

William Lewis (fl. 1687?) was a pirate supposedly active in the Caribbean, off the American east coast, and off the west coast of Africa in the 18th century. He was known for sparing his victims and for being killed after announcing he had made a pact with the Devil. He is likely the fictional creation of "Captain Charles Johnson" who presented his story among those of real historical pirates.

== Johnson's creation ==
"Captain Charles Johnson" was a pseudonym, either of Daniel Defoe, Nathaniel Mist, or another early 18th-century writer. His book A General History of the Pyrates influenced years of pirate researchers, scholars, and writers, though it was later found to have a great many errors. Its first volume is generally considered more accurate and historical; the second volume presents accounts of known and well-documented pirates such as Samuel Bellamy and Nathaniel North, but includes the fictional captains William Lewis, John Cornelius, and Captain Misson. Later authors such as Grey, Gosse, and Ellms repeated the fictional accounts nearly verbatim. There was a real pirate named William Lewis, but he was never a Captain; active 20 years after Johnson’s "William Lewis," the real William Lewis was hanged with the surviving members of John Auger's crew when they were captured by pirate turned pirate-hunter Benjamin Hornigold.

== History (purported) ==
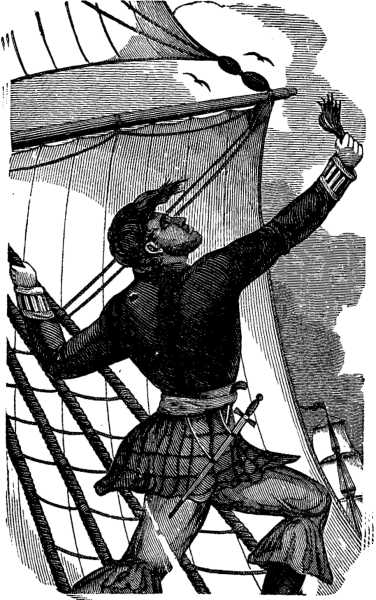
Captain Lewis giving a lock of his hair to the Devil after his masts are damaged off the coast of Guinea.

Lewis sailed as a boy with the crew of pirate Joseph Bannister, who was captured and hanged in Port Royal in 1687. He was spared (hung by his waist instead of his neck) and sailed with other ships out of Jamaica until he was captured by the Spanish. Escaping with a few others in a canoe, the multi-lingual Lewis took over a small periagua, then captured a sloop, pressing some captured crew into service as pirates and releasing others. He continued capturing small vessels, looting them and taking some crew. With 40 men he took a larger pink, using it to take several other ships near Campeche. He then looted several sloops, beating the captain of sloop who surrendered too easily, and kept the largest 12-gun sloop for his own.

Now with a mixed crew of 80 white and black sailors, he plundered vessels from Florida to the Carolinas and Virginia. He put down a mutiny by English crewmembers who planned on marooning the Frenchmen among them. Sailing north to Newfoundland, he raided the fishing fleets and boarded a 24-gun galley. The ship’s captain convinced Lewis to send his quartermaster John Cornelius ashore for supplies, where he was captured. When shore batteries fired on Lewis’ ship he fled the galley and sailed offshore. Capturing two small shallops, he demanded the release of his quartermaster in exchange for his prisoners, to which they agreed. He then captured a 24-gun French ship and left Canadian waters.

Sailing across the Atlantic to the coast of Guinea with 200 men in the newly renamed Morning Star, he captured several more ships, finally spotting a vessel from the Carolinas. Here the incident occurred for which Lewis would be best known: “While he was in chase of this vessel a circumstance occurred, which made his men believe he dealt with the devil; his fore and main top-mast being carried away, he, Lewis, running up the shrouds to the maintop, tore off a handful of hair, and throwing it into the air used this expression, good devil, take this till I come. And it was observed, that he came afterwards faster up with the chase than before the loss of his top-masts.”

Soon after, the Frenchmen of his crew rebelled. Lewis let them sail away in a captured sloop but immediately captured it back from them while they lay at anchor. He marooned the Frenchmen, allowing only a few back aboard the Morning Star. That night the Frenchmen tried to retake the ship; they were defeated, but not before assassinating Lewis in his cabin. Other versions say his sailors were superstitious and killed Lewis because they feared that he’d actually made a pact with the Devil. The quartermaster John Cornelius was chosen Captain to succeed him.

== See also ==
- Libertalia – A mythical pirate kingdom founded by “Captain Misson,” another fictional pirate from Volume 2 of Johnson’s General History.
