= Rusla =

Legendary Norwegian shield-maiden

Rusla, also known as the "Red Woman" from Middle Irish Ingean Ruagh, was a legendary Norwegian shield-maiden mentioned in the Gesta Danorum or "History of the Danes" of Saxo Grammaticus and in the Irish annals. According to Saxo, Rusla was the daughter of a fifth or sixth century king of Telemark called Rieg, and sister of Tesandus (Thrond), who was dispossessed of his throne by a Danish king named Omund. Rusla formed a pirate fleet to attack all Danish ships as revenge for the affront to her brother. Rusla was always accompanied by another woman, Stikla, who was her deputy in all raids. Stikla turned to piracy to avoid marriage, and her name is the origin of the Norwegian city of Stiklestad.

== Life and death ==
Rusla indiscriminately attacked ships and coastal towns in Iceland, Denmark and the British Isles. However, a Danish King named Omund was a trickster king and persuaded Tesandus to side with the Danes, taking him as a foster son. This plot caused Tesandus to lose his crown. Rusla waged war on the Danes in an attempt to avenge Tesandus' loss. During this conflict, she sank Tesandus' ship. Due to the mercy of Rusla, Tesandus was able to escape with his life, but this loss caused Tesandus to desire revenge on his sister. Tesandus pursued her fleet on ships of his own and eventually captured his sister Rusla, grabbing her by the braids while his crew killed her with blows from rowing oars.

== Legacy ==
Her nickname "Red Woman" comes from her bloodthirsty reputation and her custom of taking no prisoners. The Irish annals also cite Rusla and Stickla's participation in the Battle of Clontarf. They were part of the body of mercenaries hired by the Vikings who fought against Brian Boru, and Rusla lost her sons on the battlefield. Rusla went down in history as the most cruel of all warrior Norse women.

According to the medieval Irish Cogad Gáedel re Gallaib, the sons of a woman by this name died at the Battle of Clontarf in 1014. Although it has been suggested that these two Rusla are the same woman, Alexander Bugge argued that the Irish author of Cogad Gáedel re Gallaib misinterpreted the Old English name Rodla, which refers to the Viking Rollo of Normandy. The two sons who die at Clontarf are called John the Baron and Richard, which fit a Norman milieu.

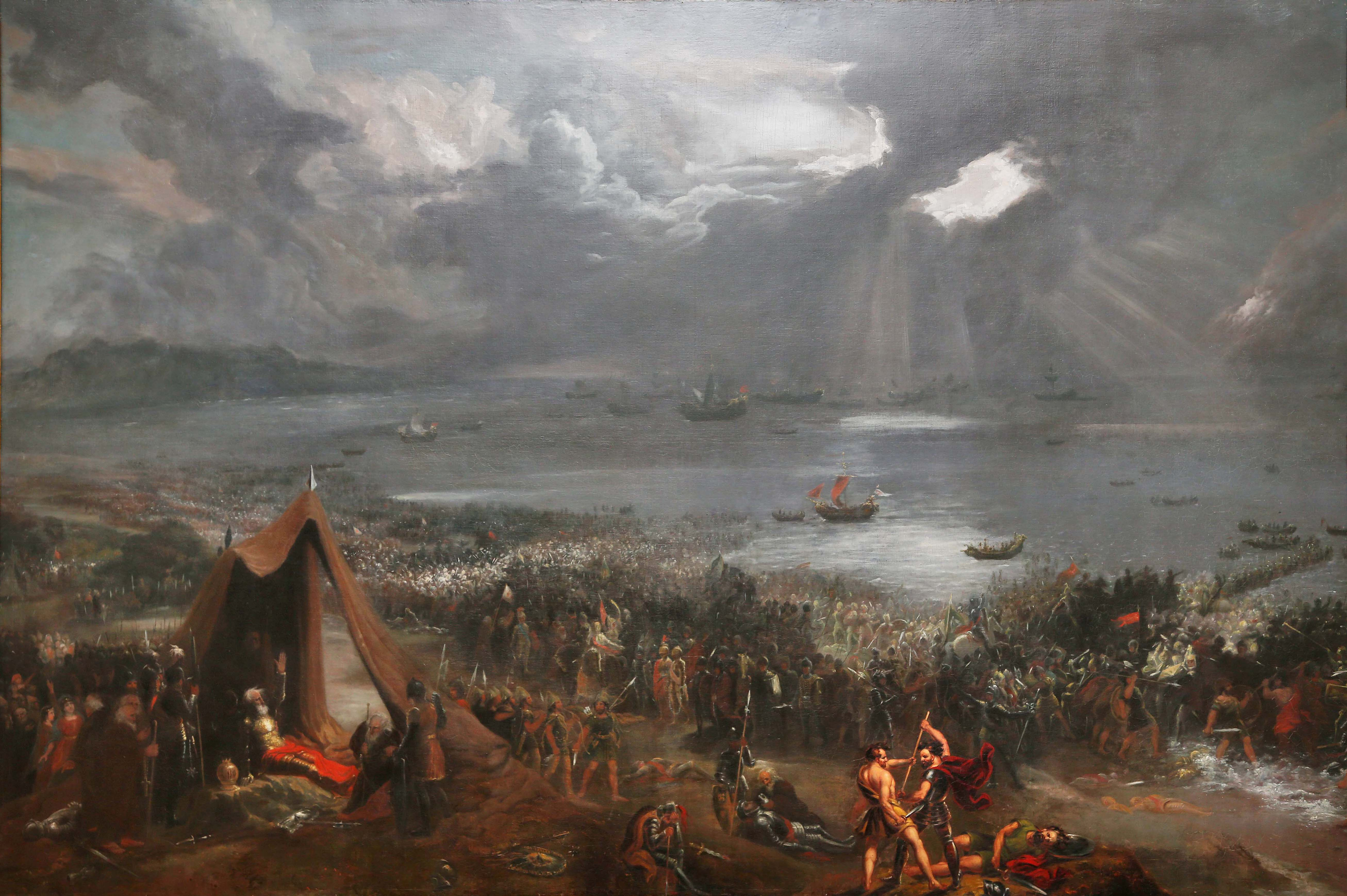
According to Irish annals, Rusla and Stickla participated in the Battle of Clontarf. Other sources cite that the sons of a woman named "Rusla" died at this battle.

== Stikla ==
In the 13th century Gesta Danorum recorded that the town of Stiklestad was named after Stikla, a shield-maiden who was most famous for raiding with Rusla. Stikla would have settled in the area at some point after her participation in the Battle of Clontarf in 1014.

== See also ==
- Princess Sela
