= HMS Revenge (1741) =

HMS Revenge (1741) was a privateering vessel commissioned by Governor of Rhode Island, Richard Ward in 1741. In his Letter of Marque, Ward names Benjamin Norton as captain, commanding him to commandeer any Spanish ship he may come across. Throughout the sloop's five month cruise, Norton kept a detailed journal of the ship's daily encounters. The ship was set to sail down the East Coast of the colonies to the Caribbean, and stop any Spanish ships from delivering supplies, or taking supplies.

The story of Revenge, and the surviving documents, are a huge insight into colonial privateering. These men operated under the laws of the crown, while being able to legally capture cargo, slaves, and boats.

== The journey ==
=== June ===
Captain Benjamin Norton writes in his journal that during the month of June, HMS Revenge remained in Huntington Bay, searching for men to join his crew. The crew started with forty-one hands (people) and three slaves. During their time in Huntington Bay, six men became mutinous, and were sent away. Ideally, Norton wanted a doctor on board the ship in case his men were injured or taken ill. The process of vetting a doctor would hold Revenge in the bay until 13 July 1741.

There is some speculation that the ship was in the bay at the time of the New York Conspiracy of 1741, due to an entry in Norton's journal, which mentions hands going to see a burning.

=== July ===
When the ship was finally able to set sail, Captain Norton recorded a total of sixty-one hands on board. The first order of business was to appoint a quartermaster, and the crew elected Duncan McKenley. Revenge would quickly make their first encounter with a Spanish ship, Humming Bird. Aboard the ship was the leader of the almost mutiny that took place in Huntington Bay, and some of the men that went with him. Norton was able to persuade the captain of Humming Bird to return the hands that had pledge themselves to Revenge. The opposing captain obliged and returned two hands.

On 28 July 1741, Revenge made a successful capture of a Spanish controlled ship, which was originally British. At 5 am lookouts aboard Revenge spotted another sloop on the horizon. They fought against one another until the opposing sloop surrendered. The ship was a British ship that had been taken over by a Spanish privateer, led by Captain Don Pedro Estrado. The captain of the sloop brought Norton the three documents that they had on board: the commission, instructions on what signal to make upon arrival at St. Augustine, and lastly what route to steer down the coast of Florida for the best results. Norton ordered a man, by the name of John Webb, to serve on board the new sloop. If they were to become separated, Webb was to take the sloop to Providence where he was to leave all of the cargo on board until Norton's arrival.

Captain Norton took the slaves on board Revenge to be sold into slavery for profit. These slaves were considered to be free under Spanish law, and despite the pleas of freedom to Norton, they were still sold into slavery. One of these black prisoners was Francisco Menéndez. Upon interrogation by Norton, Menéndez admitted to being a captain of the Spanish army at Fort Moze. Menéndez confessed to being in charge of a small company at St. Augustine. He commanded the troops under the name "Signior Capitano Francisco". After the battle, Menéndez admitted to becoming a privateer in order to return to Spain.

Francisco Menéndez would eventually be sold into slavery under the name Don Blass. Norton would be summoned to Admiralty court in the Bahamas, where he would argue that the slaves captured (including Menéndez) were not free blacks, but were slaves in the eyes of the crown. The scholar Jane Landers found that Menéndez was only sold for "thirty-four pesos", despite his worth being closer to one hundred and fifty pesos.

=== August ===
During the month of August, Captain Norton writes in his journal a number of ship repairs. At one point, the mast was destroyed by a lightning bolt in a storm. One man was hurt, and the ship had a hole. The hole would start to fill with water and would go unnoticed for hours. Once a hand noticed the damage, the men scrambled to work to patch the hole. The boatswain would be punished for not noticing the hole sooner.

August also saw a trial in Admiralty court over the recently captured sloop. Captain Norton argued that the sloop, and the cargo on board, was rightfully his property under a ruling from the king. This ruling stated that any ship taken by a British privateer for more than 96 hours (four days) was the property of the capturer. In this case, this meant the sloop captured was property of Revenge. The judge ruled in favor of Norton, and decided the cargo sold from the captured sloop would be split among the capturers. The judge also would rule that Menéndez could remain a slave, and would therefore be eligible for sale into slavery.

=== September ===
In the beginning of September, Norton mentions a hurricane, twice, that caused damage to the ship. At this point in the journey, the ship had successfully sailed to the Caribbean. Most notable, Revenge captured a sloop and a brigantine, named Sarah.

Sarah was taken by Revenge on 27 September, but the captain of Sarah confessed that the ship had initially been taken 23 days earlier by the Spanish. Initially, the ship was British, until their capturing. Overnight, the brigantine would sail off, successfully escaping from Revenge. Captain Norton wrote to John Freebody telling him of the situation, and that the owners of Sarah resided in Boston. Norton asked Freebody to find Masters Lee and Tyler of Boston for a trial in Admiralty court. The captain also mentions that some of the hands discovered the captain of Sarah was named Thomas Smith. Norton felt that Sarah, or a portion of the cargo, truly belonged to him, since he rescued the ship from Spanish hands. Freebody would formally file a complaint with the Admiralty courts of Boston on 5 November 1741.

=== October ===
Captain Norton writes that he lost sight of the recently captured sloop in a storm, but would find the ship two days later. John Webb would be appointed master of the sloop, now called Invisible. He was not to talk to anyone, and must remain in sight of Revenge at all times. Webb also had orders to sail back to Rhode Island, but not to sell the cargo until Revenge arrived. The two ships would start their travel back together.

=== November ===
John Freebody formally files the complaint in court for the capture of Sarah. The two ships, Revenge and Invisible, arrive back in Rhode Island, but Captain Norton would soon be called to Admiralty court in Boston.

== The trial for Sarah ==
Judge Robert Auchmuty complied with the complaint from John Freebody, and subpoenaed the two owners of Sarah from Boston, as well as the captain, Thomas Smith. Through the depositions of Jeremiah Harriman and Thomas Smith, the captain of Sarah, the Vice-Admiralty Judge would decree Norton and Freebody were not entitled to any salvage prizes. The judge cited two previous cases in which an English merchant ship was captured by the Spanish, then the English recaptured the ship. Both judges in the cases ruled that there would be no salvage prizes awarded because it was considered freeing the British people.

The owners of Revenge, Benjamin Norton and John Freebody, would appeal the decision, but the new judge in the case would still rule there would be no salvage prize awarded. Freebody would work with people in Boston and in London to try to get a new appeal. The case would continue on until 1743, two years after the capture of Sarah. In all of the trials, the judge would rule that there would be no prize awarded.
