= Eric Cobham and Maria Lindsey =

Purported 18th century English pirates

Eric Cobham
- Born: c. 1700; Poole, England, Kingdom of England
- Died: c. 1765 (aged c. 65); Le Havre, France
- Occupations: Pirate, later a judge
- Known for: Practising piracy in the Gulf of St. Lawrence
- Spouse: Maria Lindsey

Maria Lindsey
- Died: Le Havre, France
- Cause of death: Suicide or murder
- Occupation: Pirate
- Years active: c. 1735
- Spouse: Eric Cobham

Eric Cobham (c. 1700 – c. 1765) and his wife Maria Lindsey (fl. c. 1735) were English pirates in the early 18th century who practised piracy in the Gulf of St. Lawrence from their base in Newfoundland. They were both born in England – Cobham from Poole and Lindsey from Plymouth.

== History ==
According to Philip Gosse in The Pirate's Who's Who (1924) and Horwood and Butts in The Pirates and Outlaws of Canada (1984), the Cobhams were among the first St. Lawrence pirates to become known for giving "no quarter," meaning all the captured crews were killed and the ships sunk. They were famous for their sadism and cruelty, including using survivors for target practice. They were pirates from around the 1720s–1740s after which they relocated to Le Havre, France. They became members of the community and Eric was appointed a judge. Maria could not make the adjustment and went insane, finally committing suicide (or possibly being murdered by Eric). Eric had an attack of conscience after her death, confessed his sins to a priest, and requested the true story of his life be published. This book was printed after his death, the family tried to buy and destroy this book, however there is allegedly a copy in the National Archives in Paris. They were survived by two sons and a daughter. Gosse describes Eric Cobham as a native of Poole, who took to smuggling at age 18, and was caught. Later, he met Maria Lindsay at Plymouth, and brought her on board his ship, sailing to Newfoundland, where the couple assumed a career in piracy. The couple is said to have operated out of Sandy Point (Flat Island) on the Western Shore of Newfoundland. They are a part of Canadian pirate lore, and Maria Lindsay has been dubbed "the Canadian Pirate Queen." A fictional, romantic novel based on described events in pirate literature about Eric Cobham and Maria Lindsay exists.

== Possibility of non-existence ==
Other than secondhand mention, there is little historic proof that Eric Cobham and his wife actually existed. To some historians, it seems unlikely that the couple could have had the career described in the mid-18th century without leaving documentary traces. However, in a book, Buccaneers and Marooners of America, published in 1891, editor Howard Pyle mentions Cobham in passing as if his exploits were already well known to the public at large and details Cobham's attack on a Spanish ship in the Bay of Biscay wherein all persons of Spanish origin (around 20) aboard the seized vessel were sewn into the mainsail and thrown into the sea. While some doubt the stories and are even skeptical that the Cobhams actually existed, Dan Conlin, the historian and curator of marine history at the Maritime Museum of the Atlantic in Halifax, believes the stories are probably true, but exaggerated.
