= Charlotte de Berry =

Pirate

- Born: England
- Died: Coast of Africa
- Piratical career
- Nickname: Dick, Captain Rudolph
- Type: Pirate
- Allegiance: Pirate
- Rank: Captain

Charlotte de Berry (Note: When she first went to sea dressed as a man she used the alias "Dick"; later when she was a pirate in her own right she assumed the name "Captain Rodolph" or "Captain Rudolph." These names can vary depending on the version of her story.) was allegedly a female pirate captain.

== Authenticity ==
The earliest known reference to Charlotte de Berry comes from publisher Edward Lloyd's 1836 "penny dreadful" called History of the Pirates. Lloyd was known for producing other similar compilations of shocking and gory tales, often plagiarized. There is no evidence for de Berry's existence in 17th-century sources, though many elements of her story have parallels in other literature popular in Lloyd's day by authors such as Frank Marryat, Voltaire, and Edward Bulwer-Lytton. Retellings of de Berry's tale after 1836 have almost always mirrored Lloyd's original, sometimes with slight variations.

== History ==
In her mid-to-late teens, she fell in love with a sailor and, against her parents' will, married him. Disguised as a man, she followed him on board his ship and fought alongside him. Her true identity was discovered by an officer who kept this knowledge to himself, wanting de Berry. The officer then assigned her husband to the most dangerous jobs, which he survived thanks to his wife's help. Finally, the jealous officer accused Charlotte's husband of mutiny, of which he was found guilty based on an officer's word against that of a common sailor. He was punished and killed by flogging. Afterwards, the officer made advances towards Charlotte, which she refused. The next time the ship was in port, she killed the officer and snuck away, dressing again as a woman working on the docks. Some versions of the story omit the officer's lust for de Berry and claim that de Berry's husband ("Jack Jib") offended the officer, who ordered him flogged; she in turn murdered the officer while ashore in revenge for her husband's death.

While de Berry worked on the docks, a captain of a merchant ship saw her and kidnapped her. He forced de Berry to marry him and took her away on his trip to Africa. To escape her new husband who was a brutal rapist and tyrant, de Berry gained the respect of the crew and persuaded them to mutiny. In revenge, she decapitated him and became captain of the ship. After years of pirating, she fell in love with a planter's son from Grenada (some versions instead claim he was a Spaniard, Armelio or José Gonzalez) and married him.

However, they were ship-wrecked and after days of hunger they turned to cannibalism, where her husband was chosen by lot to be their meal. The survivors of her crew were rescued by a Dutch ship, and when that ship was ironically attacked by pirates, they bravely defended their rescuers. While the others celebrated victory, Charlotte jumped overboard in order to join her dead husband. Other versions say de Berry was wounded during the fight and fell overboard, after which her defeated crew blew up their own ship rather than be captured.

== See also ==
- Jacquotte Delahaye – Another female 17th-century pirate whose story only appeared in the 1800s.
