= Gottschalk Prize =

Academic award

The Gottschalk Prize is awarded for an outstanding historical or critical study on the 18th century and carries a prize of US$1,000. It is named in honour of Louis Gottschalk (1899–1975), second President of the American Society for Eighteenth-Century Studies (ASECS), President of the American Historical Association, and for many years Distinguished Service Professor at the University of Chicago. His scholarship exemplified the humanistic ideals that this award is meant to encourage.

== Gottschalk Prize Recipients ==
The prize is awarded annually.

== 1970–1979 ==
- 1979–80 – James L. Clifford, Dictionary Johnson: Samuel Johnson's Middle Years (McGraw-Hill)
- 1978–79 – Morris R. Brownell, Alexander Pope and the Arts of Georgian England (Clarendon Press)
- 1977–78 – John G.A. Pocock, The Political Writings of James Harrington (Cambridge University Press)
- 1976–77 – Margaret C. Jacob, The Newtonians and the English Revolution, 1689–1720 (Cornell University Press).

== 1980–1989 ==
- 1980–81 – Michael Fried, Absorption and Theatricality: Painting and Beholder in the Age of Diderot (University of California Press)
- 1981–82 – H.C. Robbins Landon, Haydn: A Documentary Study (Rizzoli International Publications)
- 1982–83 – John Sitter, Literary Loneliness in Mid-Eighteenth-Century England (Cornell University Press)
- 1983–84 – Irvin Ehrenpreis, Swift: The Man, His Work, and the Age (Harvard University Press)
- 1984–85 – David B. Morris, Alexander Pope: The Genius of Sense (Harvard University Press)
- 1985–86 – Michael Mooney, Vico in the Tradition of Rhetoric (Princeton University Press)
- 1986–87 – J. M. Beattie, Crime and the Courts in England, 1660–1800 (Princeton University Press)
- 1987–88 – John Bender, Imagining the Penitentiary: Fiction and the Architecture of Mind in Eighteenth-Century England (University of Chicago Press)
- 1988–89 – Damie Stillman, English Neo-Classical Architecture. 2 Vols. (Zwemmer)
- 1989–90 – Shared by Felicity A. Nussbaum, The Autobiographical Subject: Gender and Ideology in Eighteenth-Century England (Johns Hopkins University Press) and Jeremy D. Popkin, News and Politics in the Age of Revolution (Cornell University Press)

== 1990–1999 ==
- 1990–91 – J. Paul Hunter, Before Novels: The Cultural Contexts of Eighteenth-Century English Fiction (W.W. Norton)
- 1991–93 – Shared by Joseph M. Levine, The Battle of the Books: History and Literature in the Augustan Age (Cornell University Press) and Barbara Maria Stafford, Body Criticism: Imaging the Unseen in Enlightenment Art and Medicine (MIT Press)
- 1993–94 – Gananath Obeyesekere, The Apotheosis of Captain Cook: European Mythmaking in the Pacific (Princeton University Press) — Honorable Mention to Madelyn Gutwirth, The Twilight of the Goddesses: Women and Representation in the French Revolutionary Era (Rutgers University Press)
- 1994–95 – Daniel Vickers, Farmers and Fishermen: Two Centuries of Work in Essex County, Massachusetts, 1630-1850 (The University of North Carolina Press)
- 1995–96 – Susan Juster, Disorderly Women: Sexual Politics and Evangelicalism in Revolutionary New England (University of Michigan)
- 1996–97 – Steven L. Kaplan, The Bakers of Paris and the Bread Question 1700–1775 (Cornell University Press)
- 1997–98 – Stuart Sherman, Telling Time: Clocks, Diaries, and English Diurnal Form 1660–1785 (The University of Chicago Press)
- 1998–99 – Adrian Johns, The Nature of the Book: Print and Knowledge in the Making (The University of Chicago Press)
- 1999–2000 – Mary Poovey, A History of the Modern Fact (The University of Chicago Press)

== 2000–2009 ==
- 2000–01 – Rebecca L. Spang, The Invention of the Restaurant: Paris and Modern Gastronomic Culture (Harvard University Press, 2000)
- 2001–02 – Daniel K. Richter, Facing East from Indian Country (Harvard University Press, 2001)
- 2002–03 – Ellen T. Harris, Handel as Orpheus: Voice and Desire in the Chamber Cantatas (Harvard University Press)
- 2003–04 – Mary Terrall, The Man Who Flattened the Earth (University of Chicago Press)
- 2004–05 – Dror Wahrman, The Making of the Modern Self: Identity and Culture in Eighteenth-Century England (Yale University Press, 2004)
- 2005–06 – David Marshall, The Frame of Art: Fictions of Aesthetic Experience, 1750–1815 (Johns Hopkins University Press)
- 2006–07 – Martin Brückner, The Geographic Revolution in Early America (University of North Carolina Press) — Honorable Mention to Michael McKeon, The Secret History of Domesticity: Public, Private, and the Division of Knowledge (Johns Hopkins University Press)
- 2007–08 – David A. Bell, The First Total War (Houghton Mifflin Company)
- 2008–09 – Vincent Brown, The Reaper's Garden: Death and Power in the World of Atlantic Slavery (Harvard University Press)
- 2009–10 – David Hancock, Oceans of Wine: Madeira and the Emergence of American Trade and Taste (Yale University Press)

== 2010–2019 ==
- 2010–11 – Margaret Cohen, The Novel and the Sea (Princeton University Press)
- 2011–12 – David Eltis and David Richardson, Atlas of the Transatlantic Slave Trade (Yale University Press)
- 2012–13 – Nicholas D. Paige, Before Fiction: The Ancien Regime of the Novel (University of Pennsylvania Press)
- 2013–14 – William B. Warner, Protocols of Liberty: Communication, Innovation and the American Revolution (University of Chicago Press)
- 2014–15 – Vittoria Di Palma, Wasteland: A History (Yale University Press)
- 2015–16 – Rebecca Spang, Stuff and Money in the Time of the French Revolution (Harvard University Press) — Honorable Mention to Susan S. Lanser, The Sexuality of History: Modernity and the Sapphic, 1565–1830 (University of Chicago Press)
- 2016–17 – John O’Brien, Literature Incorporated: The Cultural Unconscious of the Business Corporation, 1650–1850 (University of Chicago Press)
- 2017–18 – James Delbourgo, Collecting the World: Hans Sloane and the Origins of the British Museum (Harvard University Press)
- 2018–19 – Paola Bertucci, Artisanal Enlightenment: Science and the Mechanical Arts in Old Regime France (Yale University Press)
- 2019–20 – Katie Jarvis, Politics in the Marketplace: Work, Gender, and Citizenship in Revolutionary France (Oxford University Press)

== 2020–2029 ==
- 2020–21 – Dustin Stewart, Futures of Enlightenment Poetry (Oxford University Press)
- 2021–22 – José Francisco Robles, Polemics, Literature, and Knowledge in Eighteenth-Century Mexico: A New World for the Republic of Letters (Liverpool University Press / Voltaire Foundation, University of Oxford)
- 2022–23 – Joan DeJean, Mutinous Women: How French Convicts Became Founding Mothers of the Gulf Coast (Basic Books, 2022)
- 2023–24 – April G. Shelford, A Caribbean Enlightenment: Intellectual Life in the British and French Colonial Worlds, 1750–1792 (Cambridge University Press)
- 2024–2025 – Asheesh Kapur Siddique, The Archive of Empire: Knowledge, Conquest, and the Making of the Early Modern British World (Yale University Press, 2024). Honorable mention to Matthew Kadane, The Enlightenment and Original Sin (University of Chicago Press, 2024)

== See also ==
- List of history awards
