= Piracy in the Atlantic World =

History of the Atlantic World and piracy

Piracy was widespread in the Atlantic World during the period commonly known as the Golden Age of Piracy (c. 1650–1730). This period featured some of the most prominent pirates, including Henry Morgan, Blackbeard, and Bartholomew Roberts.

The Golden Age of Piracy was marked by the European colonization of the Americas and the rise of transatlantic trade and migration. For the first time, large numbers of people and goods crossed the Atlantic Ocean, alongside the circulation of ideas, reshaping existing political and economic patterns and allowing the emergence of an integrated system that linked Europe, West Africa, and the Americas through commerce, slavery, religion, and cultural exchange.

European powers such as Spain, Portugal and Britain attained economic dominance largely as a consequence of their control over Atlantic trade routes. Due to intense competition between these powers, piracy, privateering, and buccaneering became commonplace, and ultimately proved difficult to regulate through legal means.

These pirates operated in the waters of the Caribbean, West Africa, and North America, thus disrupting colonial trade networks and becoming enduring figures in contemporary accounts and modern popular culture.

== Background ==
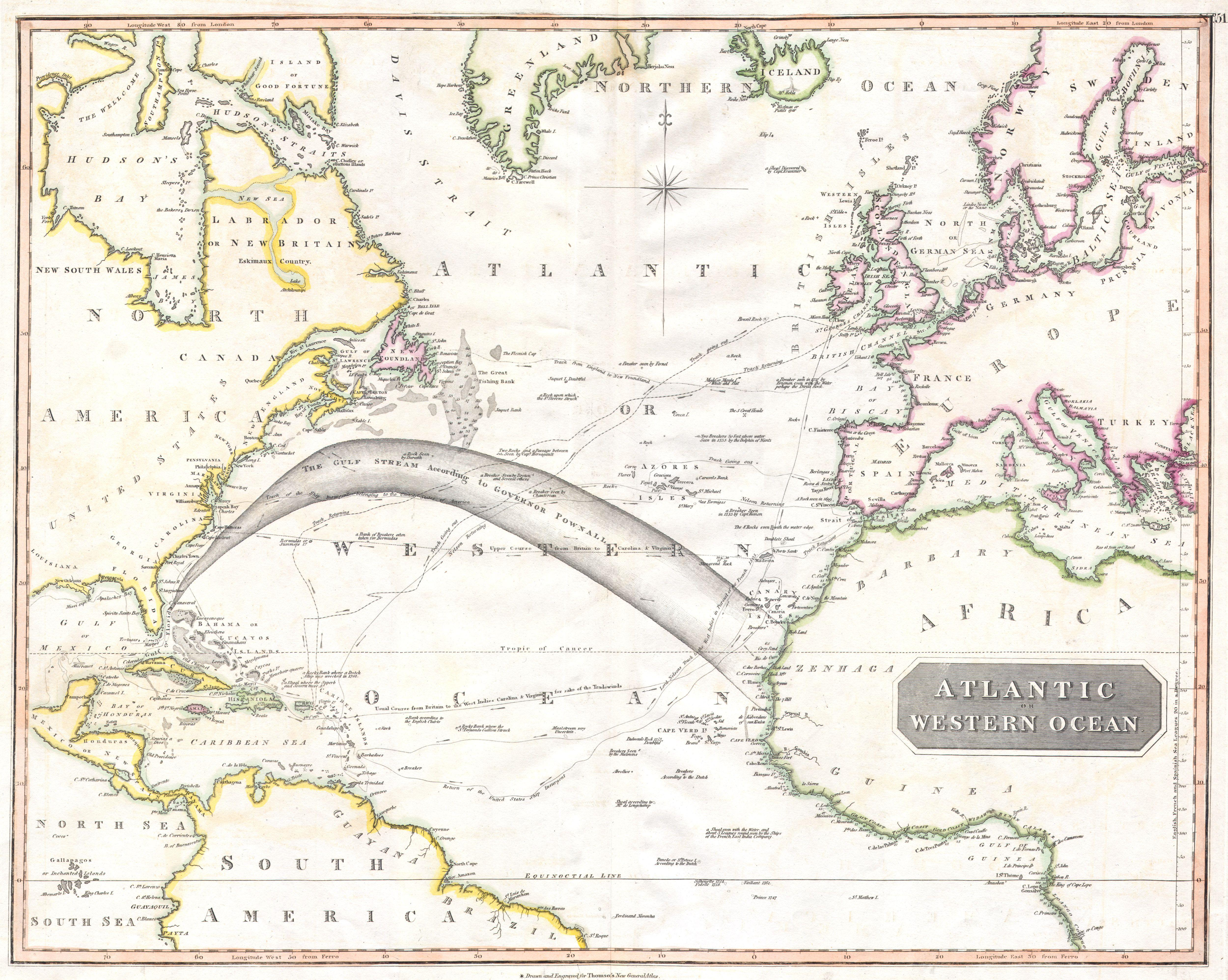
Map of The Atlantic Ocean, 1814

Piracy targeting trade routes of European colonial powers was a highly profitable venture. Pirates would attack and capture merchant vessels from any nation, disrupting their trade routes and forcing merchants and shipowners to take extra measures to safeguard their cargo.

Pirates also disrupted the Middle Passage trade routes, considered crucial to the development of modern capitalism. Pirates had a strong influence across many communities, due to their criminal activities leading to the circulation of people, ideas, and commodities.

=== Pirates, Buccaneers, & Privateers ===
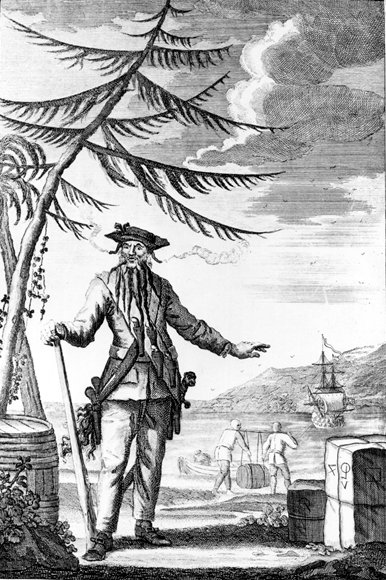
Blackbeard

Modern cultural understanding tends to conflate pirates, privateers, and buccaneers, but they are in fact three distinct categories, often distinguished in legal and historical scholarship. Although all three terms include looting and private naval military operations, the actions of privateers and buccaneers were not usually considered illegal.

Privateers were licensed by governments through "Letters of Marque" to raid enemy vessels. They were required to declare any 'prizes' before an Admiralty Prize Court, which enforced import taxes and an ad valorem tax based on the assessed value of any seized goods. This court could order privateers to pay compensation for any goods taken outside of the remit of their license.

Pirates, by contrast, were independent of any official political sanction. In the eyes of their victims, piracy was considered "massively" criminal. Anti-piracy laws were routinely very strict and carried severe punishment.

Buccaneers were in the middle, sometimes acting as legitimate agents of the state and sometimes as outright pirates. They avoided censure by choosing targets that were considered enemies by their home countries.

Originally of French origin, buccaneers were known for targeting the Caribbean islands, Central America, Venezuela, and Colombia from the 1630s to the 1690s. Writer and documentarian Alexander Exquemelin wrote about the raids after enlisting as a buccaneer, publishing a book that is considered a first-hand account of the experience.

There were many buccaneers, but the well-known Henry Morgan was responsible for raiding Cuba, Panama, and Venezuela in 1670. Morgan led what is considered the largest fleet of pirates or privateers ever assembled in the Caribbean, consisting of thirty-six ships and 1,846 crew members.

=== The Golden Age of Piracy ===
This period saw the rise and fall of many pirates who are remembered in popular culture today, including Blackbeard, Samuel Bellamy, and Bartholomew Roberts.

Although scholars agree on a boom in raiding and pillaging in the early eighteenth century, there is disagreement on how long it lasted. Some scholars suggest it started as early as 1650, but most agree it ended by 1726.

Historians typically recognize three sub-periods of the Golden Age of Piracy: the 'Buccaneering Period' from 1650–1680, the 'Pirate Round Period' from approximately 1690–1700, and the 'Period after the War of the Spanish Succession' from 1715–1726.

The signing of the Treaty of Utrecht ended the War of Spanish Succession and also ended authorized privateering. With many former privateers now unemployed and well-equipped for maritime combat, piracy became an appealing choice.

== Pre-Golden Age of Piracy ==
European-based piracy of the modern era began in the "Atlantic Triangle". This was a common area of oceangoing trade, between Seville and Cadiz, the Azores Islands, and the northwest coast of Africa (encompassing Madeira and the Canary Islands) and was haunted by both European and Berber Coast pirates throughout the sixteenth century. As consistent trade increased between Spain and Portugal, and the East and West Indies respectively, so did piracy. Activities regarded by Spain and Portugal as piracy were often tacitly sponsored, even if only marginally, by monarchs such as Queen Elizabeth I and King Edward VI. A well-known privateer in this era was Francis Drake. Drake raided Spanish settlements and shipping on the South Sea shores of present-day Peru, Chile, Brazil, and Venezuela and along the coasts of Central America. This era was notable for the beginning of regular long-term visits by pirates and privateers to the West Coast of the Americas and further to the East Indies, often after they would stop in West Africa to attack slave ships or towns.

During the Anglo-Spanish War (1585–1604), Elizabeth I promoted privateering voyages against the Spanish to weaken Spain and increase English wealth. After the war, many unemployed privateers turned to piracy, leading to a boom in piracy from 1604–1640.

Dutch merchants were active in the Caribbean, mining salt and dyewoods on the coast of Brazil. This activity led to dozens of raids along the West Coast of the Americas and to the formation of the Dutch West India Company, which had semi-legal standing as privateers. This large continuous harassment angered Spain and scared Spanish colonists. By the turn of the seventeenth century, the Dutch had formed colonies in the East Indies, and soon they were troubled with piracy; Buccaneers followed shortly after. These bandits mostly raided land settlements and were described as "embittered Dutch sailors," "abandoned French colonists," and "abused English, Scots, and Irish indentures."

== Geographic area ==
During the “Golden Age of Piracy” of the late seventeenth century to early eighteenth century, pirates operated on a global scale.

=== North Atlantic ===
Most of the pirates known during this period were from Europe. Much of the known pirate activity that took place in the Northern Atlantic was along the Eastern Seaboard of what would become Canada and the mainland U.S., from Newfoundland to the Florida Keys. Newfoundland fisheries were known as recruiting areas for pirates in the early eighteenth century. Bartholomew Roberts was involved in an encounter off the coast of Newfoundland as well. There, he captured Samuel Cary, who gave an in-depth account of the event to a Boston newspaper. New York was a popular place for pirates to unload their goods. During the first quarter of the 1700s, one of the best-known events is Blackbeard's blockade of Charleston's port often acknowledged as the pirate wars of South Carolina.

=== Africa ===
Africa was intimately tied to the economy of the Caribbean through the Atlantic slave trade, which was frequently targeted by pirates. On numerous occasions, mutinous slave ship crews became pirates. In addition, Bartholomew Roberts wreaked havoc for traders of all goods on the west coast of Africa.

As capitalism developed as an economic system in early modern Europe, overseas colonies became increasingly important in the Atlantic "triangular trade" system. Labor-intensive colonial plantations required a stable, long-term labor force. Indentured servants were not ideal as they had legal rights and could eventually become a competing force. Slave labor had many advantages over the labor of indentured servants, which led to the growth of the European slave trade.

Pirates were frequently a thorn in the side of European merchant companies in Africa, such as the Royal African Company (RAC). They disrupted the flow of labor and capital by attacking, capturing, and sometimes destroying slave ships. Pirate captains often absorbed captured slaves into their crews, and Black people, both African and African American, made up a substantial part of the pirate vanguard. The pirate's disruption of the transatlantic slave trade declined after the end of the Golden Age of Piracy, which led to an increase in the trade by the mid-18th century.

The Atlantic slave trade/Middle Passage was just as much a part of life in the Atlantic as the trade of goods. Many European powers became involved in the transatlantic slave trade by at least the eighteenth century. Countries such as Portugal, Sweden, the Netherlands, France, and Britain had outposts on the African coast. European slave traders would conduct business with larger African tribes, selling them weapons. In turn, these tribes would use the arms to raid and capture members of smaller tribes, whom they would then sell to the European slave captains. Once in the hands of an enslaver, the slave represented a substantial investment, as suggested by the insurance of purchased slaves. Some European cities, such as Liverpool, would become prosperous through this trade and would drive the slave market to handle as much business as possible.

There existed what historian Marcus Rediker called "fort trade" and "ship trade." Slaves were kidnapped and brought to forts where they would be held by the local authorities until bought and shipped out. Ship trade refers to captains making stops along the African coast at points where there was not a European presence to gather up the slaves themselves. At these stops, they would also stock up on the necessary provisions for the Middle Passage.

The captives were not the only ones who were mistreated on slave ships; as Rediker points out, the lash "operated without regard to race, age, gender, law, or humanity". Many of the sailors were beaten mercilessly if they refused to beat the slaves as harshly as the captain wanted or at all. A sailor could make roughly one to one and a half thousand dollars in current pay, which back in the eighteenth century was a fairly large sum of money for a single trip.

=== Pirate havens ===
Locations of Atlantic pirate havens

Marcus Rediker argues pirates followed a lucrative trade and sought bases for their depredation in areas that were "distant from the seats of imperial power". Pirate havens such as the Bahamian Islands began to attract pirates by the hundreds because no government existed. Frick argues that the "near-autonomous nature of a feral city" combined with its "geographic position accessible to the world's oceans" created an ideal environment for conducting acts of piracy. Frick also notes that pirates were less likely to control land the farther one moves from the coast. Even a small portion of a coastal city that tolerated pirates allowed them to establish a "toe-hold on land that will spread cancer-like" to the surrounding waters. Once established on land, pirate havens became scenes of fear and lawlessness, controlled by the pirates who inhabit them. Governments struggled to eliminate these pirate bases without risking "excessive collateral damage" and the loss of innocent lives.

One of the earliest rumored places where pirates—including those plundering the West Indies—rendezvoused was on the island of Madagascar, off the East coast of Africa.

Following the first Anglo-Spanish War, early in the 17th century, pirates established a pirate haven at Mehdya, a location with the advantage of being near Spain and major trade routes. The Moroccan sultanate tolerated these pirates due to the wealth they brought to the country. However, during summers, Mehdya became less safe as the calmer waters were navigable by the galleys used to suppress piracy; therefore, the coast of Munster was used as a complementary base for piracy. Mehdya became the main retreat of Atlantic pirates, though the Spanish blockaded Mehdya in 1611 and captured it in 1614.

In the early 17th century in Munster (Ireland's southernmost province), Leamcon (near Schull) was a pirate stronghold, while pirates traded easily in nearby Baltimore and Whiddy Island. Munster's coast provided favorable geography in the form of harbors, bays, islands, anchorages and headlands, while the province's remoteness made it difficult to control from London or Dublin. Unit 1613, literate pirates in Ireland could, escape secular trial (making their prosecution much more difficult) by pleading "benefit of clergy".

== Pirate demographics ==
=== Origins ===
Geographically, pirates "left behind little or no property and few documents by their own hands." Most pirates were from England, Scotland, Ireland, and Wales. Of that population, approximately one-quarter were linked to British port cities like London, Bristol, Liverpool, and Plymouth. Approximately one-quarter of them were men of the West Indies and North America. The rest came from other parts of the world, including the Netherlands, France, Portugal, Denmark, Belgium, Sweden, and several parts of Africa.

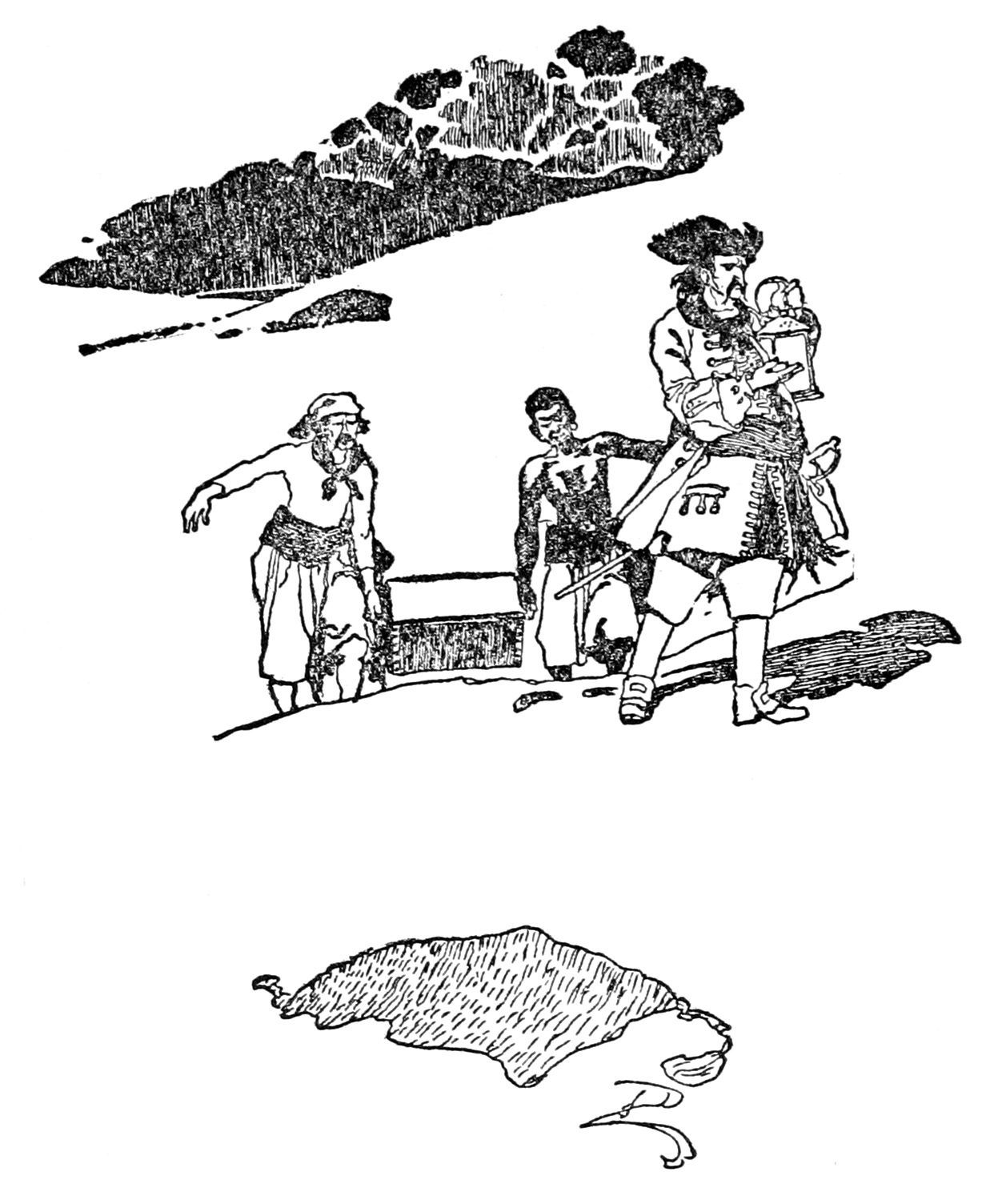
Howard Pyle's doodle of the carriage of a treasure chest by two pirates, a Caucasian and a black man, as they are led by pirate captain William Kidd

Seafaring "became one of the most common male occupations" for Africans and African-Americans in the early 19th century. Black sailors filled about one-fifth of the population at various sea havens. Becoming a pirate offered African-Americans an occupation that could improve their conditions. "Africans and African Americans both free and enslaved were numerous and active on board pirate vessels." Some chose piracy because the only other option was slavery. Some black pirates were escaped slaves. Boarding a pirate vessel became a way to escape to the Atlantic North undetected. Escaped slave Frederick Douglass disguised himself in "sailor's garb," and "was able to travel undetected to the North and his freedom." As crewmen, blacks made up part of the "pirate vanguard." They also worked the seafaring trades of "ship building, caulking, and sail making."

=== Class ===
An important factor in an individual's choice to become a pirate was social class. Pirates typically came from the lowest social classes. They often viewed piracy as a lucrative opportunity with minimal risk available to them given their limited prospects and resources. These "dispossessed proletarians" sought the wealth they needed to live and an escape from the dreadful working conditions they would have had to endure.

Piracy also represented a counterculture that attracted the working class. Living outside the society that oppressed them, piracy offered a way to attain liberty at sea. As pirates, men could organize a social world apart from the authoritarian environment of mercantilism and imperial order and use it to attack that authority's property. Life at sea made available a singular opportunity for freedom that the lower social classes could acquire. Piracy meant to forsake "fundamental social rules, escape conventional authority, manufacture their own power," and accumulate a considerable amount of wealth.

=== Occupation ===
The people who became pirates "came overwhelmingly from seafaring employments." Pirates generally had experience in labor as merchant seamen, sailors of the royal navy, privateers, and sometimes as fishermen. It was helpful to have experience within these occupations because life at sea was hard and dangerous. Seafaring skills would ease the difficulty of pirate life and provide occupational advancement while on board.

The vast majority of pirates also came from the crews of captured merchant vessels. Frequently, captured merchantmen would volunteer to join the pirate crew. The captors were already "familiar with the single-sex community of work and the rigors of life-and death-at sea." They saw little difference between merchant and pirate life. Understanding that their other option was death, the men usually volunteered to join ranks. Pirates preferred volunteers because volunteers were more likely to bond with the crew.

"Other pirates had been indentured servants, especially the fourteen-year variety." A fourteen-year indenture "meant that they [the servants] had been transported to the colonies in punishment for crimes committed in England." Transferring from one life of crime to another was painless.

=== Age ===
According to Gilje and data collected during the American Revolution, pirates ranged in age from 14 to 50 years old. More than half of this population was in their 20s, with the average age being 25. Less than 20 percent of the seamen were under 20 years old, and most were 18 or 19. While it was possible for a ship to include boys as young as 10 or 12, this was uncommon. In such rare cases, parents or guardians typically arranged and signed the boys onto the ships. Approximately 20 percent of the pirate population consisted of men in their 30s, 40s, and 50s. This smaller percentage was due to the fact that by the time a man reached his 30s, he often either transitioned to a different occupation on land, turned to fishing, labored on the docks, or had been lost at sea."

Aside from the criminal world of piracy, there were also the emerging colonies in North America. Gilje argues that while nearly as dangerous and deadly as becoming a pirate, colonialism in the Americas offered those who dared a chance to change their status in society. In many ways, the freedom and rewards of colonialism and piracy were similar. Both were risky and dangerous, and gave an individual the chance to make many decisions of their own accord.

== Becoming a pirate ==
=== Mutiny ===
Hans Turley argues mutiny was common on long voyages despite the brutality of discipline. If captains even heard discussions of revolt, talk was a serious offense due to the "direct assault on the order—thus the status quo—on a seagoing vessel." Turley also argues that there were great "temptations to turn pirate" for employment and profit; and therefore, when the "wars ceased, sailors faced either remaining idle or making smaller wages" or ultimately turn pirate.

Other mutineers were "privateer crews" who became "frustrated by the lack of booty" or even became greedy or were unhappy with their terms. The temptation of mutiny, according to Rediker, grew from an "array of resistances against such concentrated authority" and the sailors developed an understanding of the importance of equality. However, only one third of all mutinies at sea led to piracy.

"Collectivism" and "anti-authoritarianism" were cemented into the mutineers' core values, and all of these beliefs would influence the decision to turn pirate and how they would conduct themselves thereafter. In contrast to the egalitarian belief towards mutiny, Peter Leeson argues, the "prospect of sufficient gain" may influence a sailor; piracy could pay extremely well — sometimes better than privateering. A pirate could enjoy every penny of the ship's "ill-gotten booty." Another argument against the egalitarian idea of mutiny that Leeson suggests is that the pirate was as "self-interested as anyone else" and "given the opportunity" would ultimately "take ten times as many shares" as his fellow pirates if, in fact, they could get away with it.

=== Impressment ===
Impressment was the practice of forcibly recruiting sailors into naval service. This practice was employed by both national navies and pirate crews. While widespread in the Royal Navy, it was also used by Atlantic pirates to maintain adequate crew numbers. The practice often led to high rates of desertion and decreased morale, particularly in the British Royal Navy, where some impressed sailors subsequently joined pirate crews. However, pirate ships also experienced significant turnover.

Historian Denver Brunsman notes that "the vast majority of impressments in colonial regions involved small numbers of seamen, mostly to replace the diseased, deserted, or deceased." Due to the inherent dangers of maritime life, whether as a pirate or a common seaman, impressment was considered a necessary evil in 18th-century seafaring. The practice remained a contentious issue for the British Royal Navy until its abolition following the Napoleonic Wars in 1815.

State-sponsored or military impressment was entirely different in the Atlantic World when compared to impressment in the world of piracy. According to Paul Gilje, impressment was used by the British government as a way to deny liberty to Britons who called the colonies home. While the manpower would be welcome on the ship, the more important goal of the British government exerting its power over British subjects living in the colonies was purely political.

Pirate ships frequently impressed individuals possessing skills deemed beneficial for the successful operation of a vessel. While this was not standard practice in the early Golden Age of Piracy, by the 1720s, pirate crews increasingly resorted to impressment due to a shortage of seamen willing to join voluntarily. When Blackbeard captured the French slave ship La Concorde in 1717 and renamed her Queen Anne's Revenge, he forcibly retained several skilled crew members. This included three surgeons, carpenters, and a cook, who were compelled to join his pirate crew.

=== The rewards of piracy ===
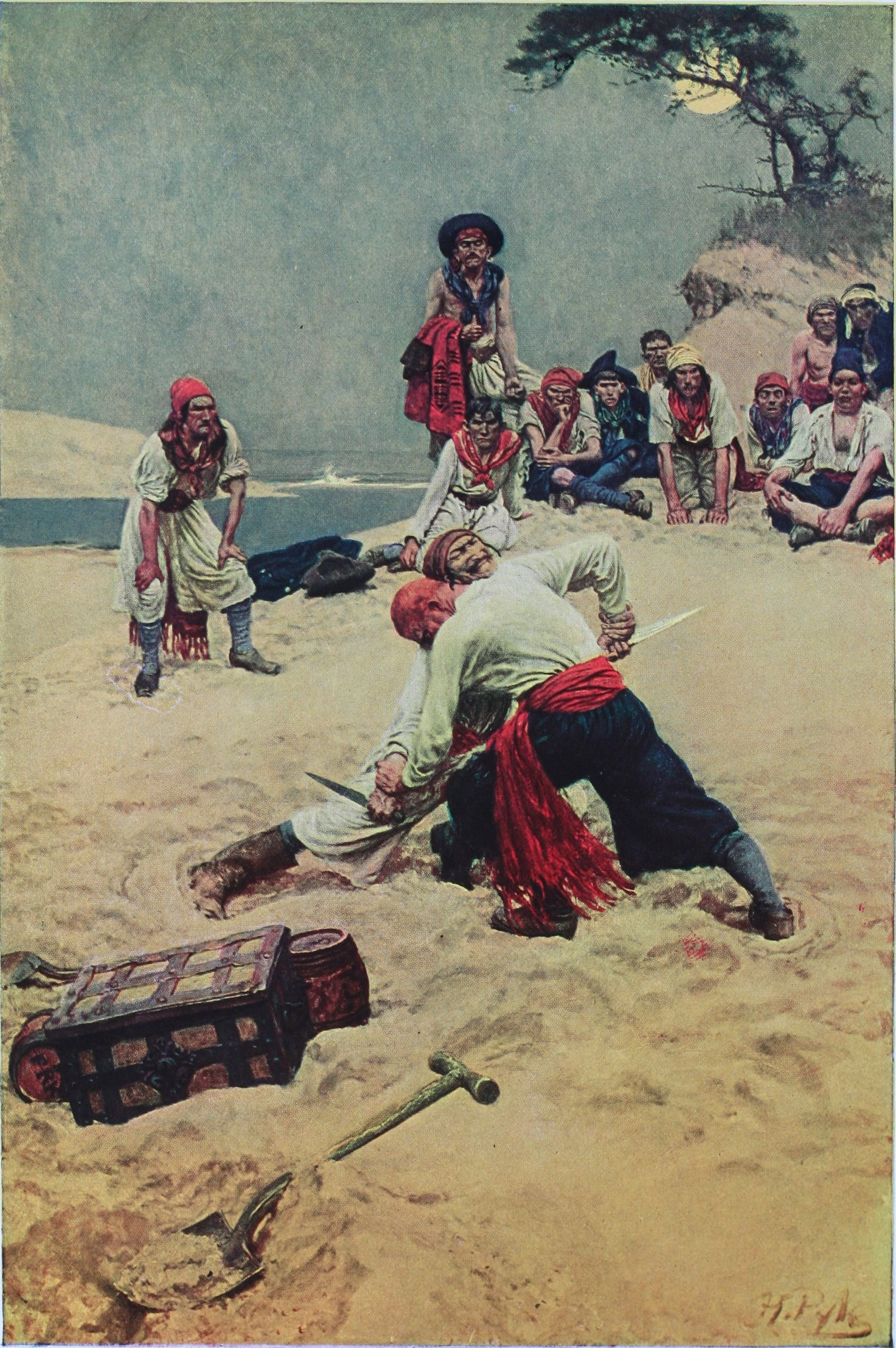
Pirates fight over treasure - Howard Pyle

The primary motivation for sailors to turn to piracy was the potential for substantial financial gain. The rewards available through piracy far exceeded those attainable through service in national navies or employment on merchant vessels. While many pirates were caught and punished by the state, untold numbers disappeared, some with their newly acquired riches.

Another appeal of piracy is that the pirate ship freed them from the hierarchical command structure, often enforced with violence, found in the navy and on merchant vessels. Still others may have become pirates to continue living in a homosocial world wherein they could practice their preferred sexuality.

=== Pirate ships ===
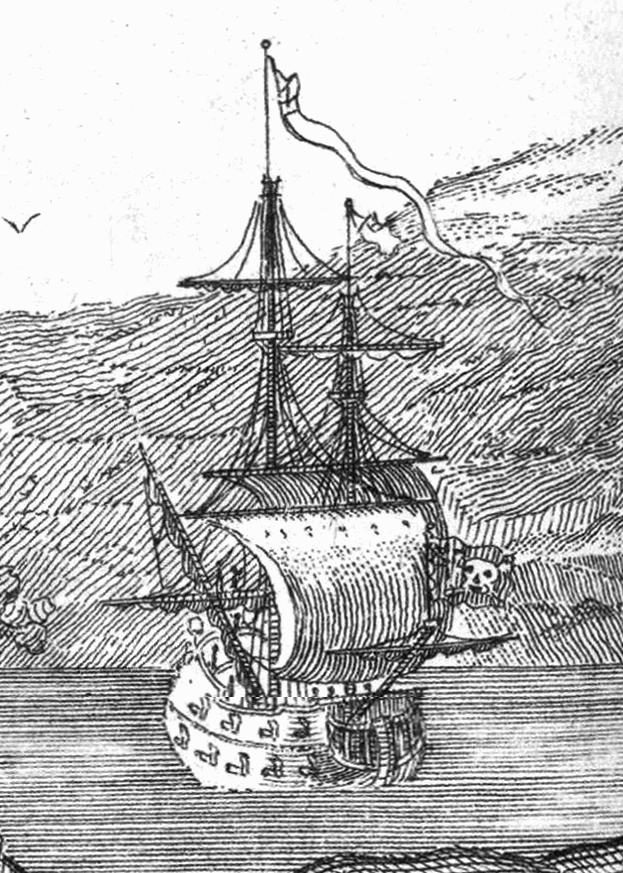
Queen Anne's Revenge

Pirates did not have the luxury of building their ships; they were "acquired" or stolen. As a result, a pirate captain had to be on the lookout for a vessel that would serve his purpose and procure the ship without damaging it in such a way as to make it unfit for service. There is consensus among scholars that pirates would use both small vessels like a sloop or a full-rigged pinnace, as well as larger slave ships (but not as often), and, on rare occasions, warships. Along these lines, the naval historian David Cordingly categorized pirate attacks that had been reported along the North American seaboard between 1710–1730 by the numbers of recorded attacks, with an overwhelming 55% involving sloops, 25% in the larger ships, 10% in brigs and brigantines, 5% in schooners, 3% in open sail-less boats, and 2% in snows.

Smaller vessels offered distinct advantages in the Caribbean and coastal regions. Their size allowed for easier and quicker careening compared to larger ships, which helped pirate crews access dry docks and afford extended periods for maintenance. These smaller ships also featured shallower draughts, enabling them to navigate and conceal themselves "among sandbanks, creeks, and estuaries" inaccessible to larger vessels. This ability to maneuver and hide in shallow waters provided significant tactical advantages for pirate operations. The smaller vessels were also faster over shorter distances than the larger ships of the age. The ratio of displacement to sail capacity was high on small ships, meaning it was easier to bring the boat up to speed fast and produce more speed with less sail. Small vessels made up the bulk of the pirate fleet in the West Indies and the Atlantic for these reasons; among the favored were the single mast sloops and schooners.

For all of the advantages of a small ship, there were drawbacks that could lead captains to look to larger vessels. A sloop or a ship of similar size could not carry a large enough crew to take on bigger prizes by boarding and couldn't carry enough firepower to force submission or fight it out with larger foes; it was also limited in the amount of cargo it could carry. Anything the size of a sloop would not carry more than fourteen guns, with the French sloop's carrying six guns or less. Conversely, some of the largest pirate ships, like Bartholomew Roberts' flagship the Royal Fortune sported forty-two guns.

Successful pirate crews would capture or buy a small ship to begin with and then "trade up" to larger ones. However, changing ships many times was not the norm, and most crews would stick with one or two ships. A pirate would make the switch from a small to a large vessel for the advantages a small ship could not provide or to replace a ship that was damaged or needed such extensive repairs that could not be done by the crew. When a ship was captured, it had to be converted into a vessel suitable for the pirates' needs. This meant knocking down cabin walls and lowering the forecastle to create a flush deck, allowing greater utilization of deck space in engagements and storage of armaments. Any unnecessary decorations or structures would be stripped off so that as many guns as possible would fit. What was left when they were finished was a sleek, armed-to-the-teeth ship focused on speed and efficiency.

It was not easy for pirates to capture a "man-of-war" (see "ship of the line"), but they would sometimes come across large ships that could be easily converted for use such as slave ships—these were full rigged, three mast giants. A slave ship loaded with human cargo and a small crew was easy prey for pirates who wanted to take her or strip everything of value. An example of this is the pirate capture of the Princes Galley, a slaver heading to the Caribbean. The pirates pursued and caught the galley, firing their guns to slow and stop the slave ship; eventually they pulled up alongside and took the gold, gunpowder, weapons, and slaves and sailed off.

=== Weaponry ===
Archaeologists Lawrence E. Babits, Joshua B. Howard and Matthew Brenckle propose that pirate weaponry might have ranged in national origin and size, and pirates might have had a variety of weapons which were captured as they upgraded their vessel and personal weapons; pirates also may have "shifted weaponry from one vessel to another" to create a "more powerful armament." For example, in late 1996, Blackbeard's flagship, the Queen Anne's Revenge was discovered. This vessel was originally mastered by Henry Bostock (1717) and captured by Blackbeard on December 5, 1717 and what was found on it was a "smaller two cannon exhibited inscriptions", which revealed that one was manufactured in England" and the other in Sweden. Wayne R. Lusardi argues there is "considerable reasonable doubt" for the ship's identification and Blackbeard's flagship, and if it is Queen Anne's Revenge, the "artifact assemblage does not reflect" in any way a "distinctly piratical material culture." Lusardi also states the idea of a pirate leaving small arms and ammunition on a grounded vessel is perplexing, yet "many abandoned items occur in the archaeological record."

Since then, thirty-one cannons have been identified, and more than 250,000 artifacts have been recovered. The cannons are of different origins, such as Swedish, English, and possibly French, and of different sizes as would be expected with a colonial pirate crew. Pirates also used "bags of shot" or langrage more than men-of-war did because they were made up easily and this was certainly used on the 1717 Whydah, which was a "vessel positively identified as a pirate."

There are a few differences in weaponry between pirates and men-of-war but one in particular are hand grenades which were "hollow cannonballs filled with black powder" and "pierced with a circular hole" in which a "bamboo tube was inserted" to serve as a "conduit for the fuse." According to Johnson, grenades were also "case bottles fill'd with powder" with "shot, slugs, and pieces of lead or iron" with a quick "match at the end of it" presently ran into the "bottle to the powder." Others argue that any suggested pirate ship or pirate artifact models include precisely those items that an armed merchantman would have, including a "mix of cannon of different sizes", often from different nations, loaded with "shot designed to damage a vessel's rigging and personnel." Also, personal weaponry such as pistols, cutlasses, and knives would be found on any vessel, which Rediker argues was used to "slit the noses of captives, cut off ears" and used the "knife and gun against their victims."

=== Terrorism as tactics ===
The Early Modern World was replete with various methods of coercion and violence that the state would utilize to impose its will on the lower rungs of society. Not only did they lose control over their lives, but many were subjected to various methods of torture and capital punishment. The institutionalization of these devices cultivated the notion of terror from above. According to Marcus Rediker, "Pirates consciously used terror to accomplish their aims", which varied from physical violence and intimidation to acquiring remuneration. Pirates primarily sought easy gains that would allow them to acquire booty while avoiding actual conflict.

The most prominent tool pirates had at their disposal when confronting a potential prize was the Jolly Roger. This symbol was easily identified, and the consequences of resistance were equally well known. Sailors knew that, if in their attempt to defend their ship they failed, there was a great possibility that they could be tortured. Pirates were notorious not solely for co-opting of disciplinary tactics commonly used by the men sailing with official commission but also for their habit of "destroying massive amounts of property" with impunity. The desecration of cargo and impairment of ships were standard occurrences in run-ins with pirates. This is believed to be an "indirect terror" against those the pirates saw as their enemies.

=== Theft ===
The pirates' characteristic loot included various ships' cargoes, like slaves or tobacco. There were also very unconventional trophies, such as the wig of a captured captain that the famed pirate Walter Kennedy once took as booty. The most sought after prize that pirates wanted to capture was unquestionably a ship that pirates could convert to suit their own needs. Pirates would scrape a captured ship for guns, masts, rope, and other supplies that could repair or improve their current vessel. Capturing a ship that was more equipped and more powerful than their current craft was the ultimate prize. The issue was that "the pirate could only capture a prize which his vessel could catch." A faster, larger ship with quality weaponry generally meant that the pirate could capture other treasures more easily.

It was not tricky for pirates to steal a "deep-sea sailing ship, especially small, fast, and well-armed craft such as sloops." The most common method of acquiring prizes was capture. Capturing involved overcoming a ship by boarding, gunnery, and possibly intimidation. Another method within piracy was the "crime of opportunity." Pirates would take their time identifying a target that was easy to capture. The "easy" targets were rare whilst on the high seas. This meant that pirates usually had to lie in wait for the opportunity to capture anything. Due to their opportunistic and sometimes patient methods, pirates for the most part were able to "capture their prizes without fighting." Threatening violence was an effective way that pirates were able to plunder ships, and "force disclosure of information about where booty was hidden."

Those in the Atlantic were affected greatly as pirates captured, plundered, and burned "hundreds of merchant ships" with valuable cargo. However, the goal of the pirate was to rob the ship without fighting or blood loss. Pirates faced losses from "resistant victims who hid or destroyed" loot. Because of this, pirates made an effort to "maximize profit" and minimize conflict, which could be bad for the pirates, the profits, and the ship. Though pirates wanted to avoid fighting, they still had to overcome the lost potential of hidden loot. Two examples of loss could come when a captured ship's crew "destroyed booty to prevent pirates from taking it" or when a crew would hide "valuables to keep them out pirate hands." Pirate theft was not only to gain money; papers with information like the route of government authorities or the location of another vessel with a larger booty were also important. Once an item was found, a question of its worth and how to distribute it came next. If an object was "indivisible," then the pirates would sell the object or auction it off, and the profits would then be divided.

Like most people, pirates "were creatures of incentives." Piracy allowed a crew to benefit from "every penny of its ship's ill-gotten booty." One's share of the plunder was directly proportionate to a crewman's job aboard the ship, and was outlined in the ship's articles. If a pirate were to take more than his share, hide in times of war, or be dishonest with the crew, he "risked being deposited" somewhere unpleasant and full of hardships. Also, ships were not the only things that were able to be plundered. A select group of pirates also attacked a Sierra Leone fort and several fortresses used for the slave trade.

== The life of a pirate ==
=== Governance and shipboard relations ===
Pirates were outlaw sailors, but that doesn't mean they didn't have their own form of government aboard their ships. Shipboard relations were often structured. This structure did not replicate the oppression of a naval ship sailing under the king's crown as, "They wanted leadership by example, not leadership by ascribed status and hierarchy." Before each voyage, or upon the election of a new captain, compacts were drawn up to which guidelines the ship would function. Under these agreements were allocations of authority, distribution of plunder and rations, as well as discipline enforcement.

==== Rank ====
Ranks that were found on ordinary vessels of the seventeenth, and eighteenth century were found on pirate ships. They were a necessary part of working together efficiently to survive the perils of the seas. Failure of captains and other officers to condescend to seamen could result in the desire for the crew to mutiny, thus challenging the officers' right to deference. The late 18th century's challenges to monarchical and aristocratic power structures bled over into shipboard life.

Pirates were mostly former merchant seamen, or at least men who had sailed on vessels legitimately before turning to piracy. As a result, a pirate ship still had the usual terminology found on merchant ships, but the role each ranking sailor would play on the pirate ship was not the norm. A pirate ship still had a Captain of the vessel. As the economist Peter Leeson argues, pirate captains were democratically elected by the entire crew. This was not a lifelong title and had less power than the merchant captain, as Leeson provides evidence of pirate captains being removed from the position; in one case, thirteen captains were removed during one voyage, for not performing at the level that was expected of them or for overstepping their bounds of authority. The Pirate captain had absolute command when pursuing a vessel or in military engagements; otherwise, he was another member of the crew.

To check the power of the captain even further, the crew would elect a quartermaster to make sure the men received the necessary rations and equal distribution of the booty. He would also "adjudicate crew member conflicts," and "administer punishment." This was usually an experienced seaman whom the crew trusted and knew well. Leeson further states that a pirate captain could not take any action without the support of the quartermaster. One such was Hendrick van der Heul who sailed with William Kidd. He had the fortune to have never been convicted of Piracy and lived a full life beyond his days on the Adventure Prize.

Other ranks include the boatswain, master, gunner, doctor, and carpenter. The regular crewmen held the most power on the pirate ship in the council, from which all important decisions were made, and every pirate was given a vote. Surgeons on some pirate vessels, because of their higher status in regular society and special training, were not allowed to vote when the council took to the ballot box.

==== Discipline ====
Shipboard discipline on merchant and naval vessels was notoriously harsh and, more often than not, violent. Pirates, having suffered under these measures, used a more democratic process to determine how aberrant sailors would be punished, and there were fewer transgressions that were considered punishable. These punishments were often still violent, which was the norm in the early 18th century.

=== Community ===
Becoming a pirate required uprooting their living environment and spending most of their time out at sea. The men were required to live in cramped, claustrophobic quarters within close proximity of others. The discomfort could have created a more hostile environment, but it did not. While on the ship, the pirates "maintained a multicultural, multiracial, and multinational social order." This new social order established a profound sense of community amongst the men. They consistently showed solidarity for each other and developed strong feelings of group loyalty. The communities of pirates were willing to join forces "at sea and in port, even when the various crews were strangers to each other." The positive communal atmosphere aboard ship created a home-like situation where there were limited social and physical boundaries within the group.

=== Clothing ===
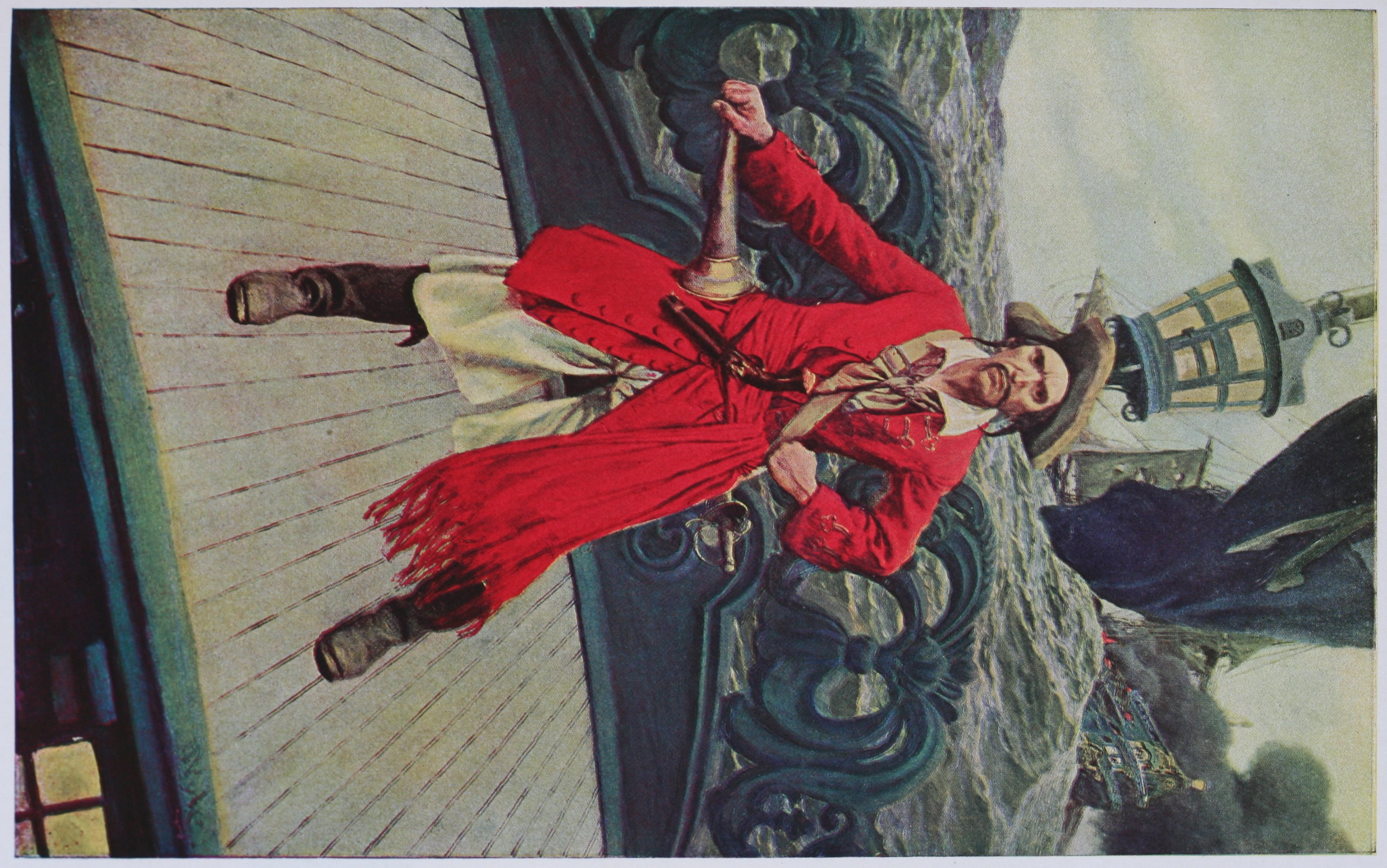
Howard Pyle's 20th century depiction of a pirate captain

Prior to 1748, no standard issue uniforms were issued to anyone aboard a British Royal Navy vessel. Until 1664, sailors who were pressed into the Navy were not given any clothing, forced to use what clothes they had on their backs until accumulating several months of pay, when they could then buy clothing. Clothing was somewhat standardized by 1623 when it was made possible for sailors to purchase clothing at fixed prices from the Navy Commissioners. The selection was not extensive--items included: Monmouth caps, red caps, yarn stockings, Irish stockings, Blew shirts, white shirts, cotton waistcoats, cotton drawers, Neat's leather shoes, Blew neck clothes, canvas suites, rugs of one breadth, and Blew suites.

Pirates of the early eighteenth century and prior wore much of the same clothing as any sailors. Clothing, when captured as booty, would be distributed. Sir Richard Hawkins, the famous Elizabethan privateer, advocated wearing armor in battle while at sea. Records indicate that there were not nearly enough pieces of armor for all to wear, so it was likely for his officers and himself. Woolen clothing was worn in more extreme latitudes.

=== Pirate speech ===
Peter Leeson and Marcus Rediker argue a pirate was more often than not someone from a previous seagoing occupation. They were merchant seamen, sailors in the royal navy, and privateers, all of whom would form into a pirate crew. They were not upper class, but the "dregs of society." George Choundas argues in his book Pirate Primer that there was in fact a pirate language, but it was simply accents and the way of speech to which men of the seas were accustomed. They came from different ethnic backgrounds or political units, so pirate speech was simply the way these men could communicate, and what they all knew was the language of the seas. It was the nautical speech of the seventeenth, eighteenth, and nineteenth centuries.

=== Food and alcohol ===
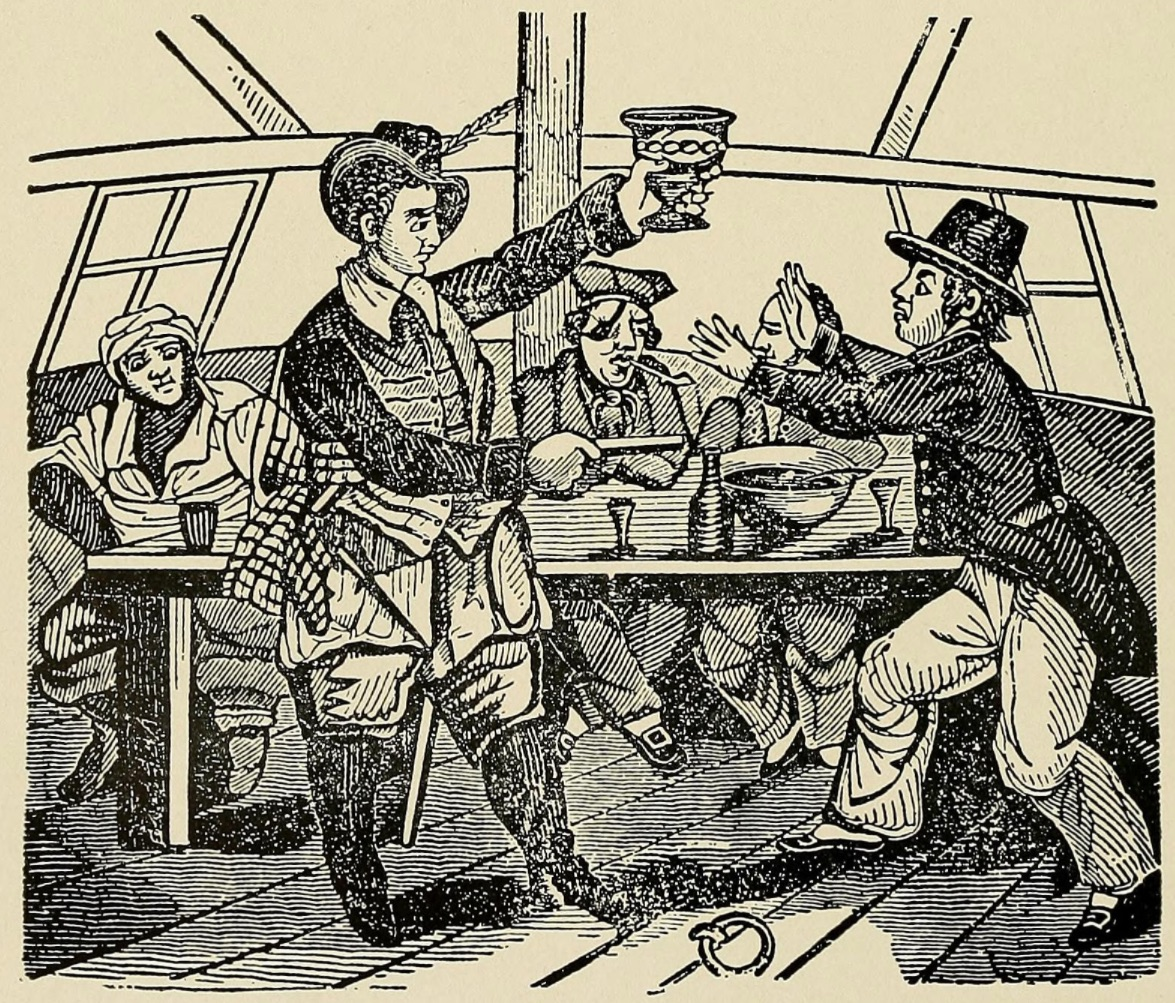
Pirate Captain John Phillips forcing a prisoner at gunpoint to drink alcohol

Pirates of the Atlantic ate similarly to their mainstream mariner cohorts. However, they often would get more of it, and ideally, they would get far greater quality food. Mariners in the merchant and naval service were often given meagre amounts of low quality sustenance. During a typical week, five non-pirate sailors might share four or five pounds (pre-salted weight) of beef and five pounds of bread. Scarcity of food might be the main reason some sailors turned to pirating, like pirate John Phillips who "ranted and raved" about the merchant John Wingfield, claiming that he starved his men. The primary difference between legal mariners and their unlawful counterparts is that they hoped to find an abundant supply of food with the capturing of vessels.

A defining difference in the food system on a pirate vessel is that they did not have to compete with officers like sailors in the navy or merchant services.

Food and alcohol were treated similarly to each other, split equally. The necessaries of life were distributed equally, unlike booty, which was usually given in higher proportions to officers, as directed in their articles. Bread, butter, cheese, and meat were items that were considered luxuries by many low level mariners, but items that a pirate would look forward to as often as possible. There is evidence pirates specifically hoped to find food and drink in their loot over specie. One pirate, Joseph Mansfield, claimed that the "love of drink" were greater motives than gold. This policy of strict equality does not seem to have been applied by earlier privateers, as Kris Lane points out in Pillaging The Empire: Piracy in the Americas, 1500-1750. Dutch Sea Rover of the seventeenth century, Joris Van Speilbergen and the expeditions leaders dined on "Beef, pork, fowl, citrus, fruits, preserves, olives, capers, wines, and beer," while the common crew of that voyage "scrounged herbs" with mussels and berries."

Captain George Lowthar used deception, pretending to be a friendly merchantman, came aboard a fellow merchant ship to extend customary greetings. There, Lowthar's crew secretly inspected the cargo and found items of interest. Once making their intentions known to the boarded crew, they ended up taking thirty casks of brandy and five hogshead of wine, among other goods. Lowthar's crew had only decided to seize the ship once they decided it was worth taking.

Sailors might hope to supplement their meagre diets with fish if they were lucky enough to catch them. The islands frequented were plentiful with potential foods, such as turtle, seafowl, shellfish, and fish. Sea turtle was considered some of the best meat possible. While at sea, when supplies were low, fresh fish such like snapper, shark, catfish, grouper, albacore were caught and often barbecued, though one would have to be certain not to let the deck catch on fire. When food was scarce, a rationing system may be put in place similar to legal sailors. In some cases, the only items there were requested of the looted victim from pirates was food and drink. When gold or silver was found, food was a popular item to barter for when bartering was easier than fighting.

Water was essential but difficult to keep usable for very long. Alcohol, like beer and especially wine, would keep much longer. Like food, pirate crews were given equal title to captured strong liquors. Notoriously, alcohol was spent quicker than on other, more traditional marine vessels. Ironically, a slaver turned pirate Bartholomew Roberts was a "sober man" and would not allow his own crew to drink on board the ship.

Woodes Rogers, a privateer turned pirate hunter, noted a drink called "flip". Flip consisted of rum, beer, and sugar served warm, often in a tin can. Another popular drink was punch. Different versions were made depending on what ingredients were available. One rum version was called "bumboe." Captain George Shelvocke enjoyed "hipsey," a concoction of brandy, wine, and water.

Andrew Brown's sermon during the late 18th century focused on the perils of "the seafaring life." Focusing on the overindulgence of alcohol, he preached that drinking had become habit for pirates. He continued that overindulgence had "long been regarded as one of the distinguishing characteristics of seafaring life." B. R. Burg writes extensively about the debauchery and riotous behavior of pirates when they got a hold of quantities of alcohol. There are numerous cases where pirates were too drunk to capture ships, defend their own ships, negotiate for prisoner exchanges, control crews to prevent mutinies, and sometimes even to just navigate. In one case, 118 men of a 200-person crew perishing because of a shipwreck. Blackbeard, after a "prolonged drinking bout" and while "uproariously laughing" shot his mate, Israel Hand's knee, "laming him for life."

=== Illness, disease, and health ===
Sickness and diseases, such as dysentery, malaria, smallpox, and yellow fever, caused problems on ships and "could be fatal." Pirates, like privateers, were a little better off than those who worked on merchant or naval ships as the "food was superior," the "pay was higher," the "shifts were shorter," and the crew's powers of "decision making was greater." Epidemics and scurvy led some to desert "naval vessels for pirates." In the event of disabilities occurring while in service to the ship, some pirates set up a "common wealth" plan to be paid to any man in the event of injury. Medical artifacts recovered from the wreck site of Blackbeard's Queen Anne's Revenge include: a urethral syringe used to treat syphilis, pump clysters to pump fluid into the rectum, a porringer which may have been used in bloodletting treatments, and a cast brass mortar and pestle used to prepare medicine.

==== Doctors and surgeons ====
There were doctors and surgeons present on some pirate vessels. Any surgeon or doctor who sailed with pirates, according to Rediker, was considered by their peers "to be insane." Surgeons/doctors were paid more shares, between "one and a quarter" and "one and a half" more, than other men on pirate ships. However, doctors and surgeons weren't always trusted as they were not allowed to vote with the crew "because their class background (or forced status)."

=== Women on ships ===
Superstitions surrounding women on ships were rampant. Being on board a pirate ship demanded "physical strength and stamina". Few women were seen as able to do the work to the standard. It was widely believed aboard ships that women were detrimental to both work and social order. Women were "objects of fantasy", yet they were also seen as cause of poor circumstances, disagreement, and "potential breaches in the male order of seagoing solidarity".

A rare story of a woman persuaded to board a pirate ship comes from Captain Eric Cobham and a prostitute named Maria. Even though the ship's articles stated boys and women were not permitted on the ship, Cobham faced no repercussions from the crew when he brought her aboard. While on the ship, Maria proved that she was "as callous as the worst of them". Maria's actions made Cobham "more nervous than ever," so much so that she effectively scared him from pirating.

Anne Bonny and Mary Read were two women who served under John Rackham during his brief career in 1720. They wore men's jackets, pants, and tied handkerchiefs around their heads. After Rackham's capture in October 1720, Bonny and Read were tried and found guilty of piracy. Both women pled their bellies in hopes for mercy. Read later died in jail around April 1721. Bonny was not executed and likely died in December 1733.

=== Pirates and sex ===
Carolyn Eastman finds that pirates were represented as hypermasculine characters from the 18th century forward, and she notes that they were depicted as sexual transgressors. She argues that this imagery of piracy appealed to elite men, who enjoyed the thought of an alternate masculinity without the restraint required of men in the upper classes.

== "Enemies of all mankind" ==
=== Hosti Humani Generis ===
The scourge of the high seas pirates was cast as "hostis humani generis", a term derived from Roman law--Latin for 'an enemy of mankind'. This title was rendered onto them in part by Sir Edward Coke in his effort to renovate existing legislation which dealt with piracy. As a consequence of this label, a British Admiralty Judge by the name of Sir Charles Hedges would issue a sweeping proclamation which would grant the power of "jurisdiction over all people – anywhere on earth – who interfered with British commerce." The last great epoch of piracy gave rise to a generation defined by, "their almost universal rejection of national and religious authorities."

In the book Rum, Sodomy, and the Lash, Hans Turley delves into the implications of the multidimensional threat pirates posed to the social and economic establishment in the British realm. Turley states that there was an argument to be made that pirates were perceived to "belong to no class at all" and that they had "turned their backs to normative society." Furthermore, to solidify the rendering of the term hostis humani generis to pirates, Turley connects the economic and legal implications stating that pirates were "criminal merchants" who were "opposed to law-abiding seafaring merchants."

=== Cotton Mather ===
Puritan minister Cotton Mather wrote that the coast had been plagued by pirates and his congregation wished they could be rid of this nuisance. Mather believed that his prayers were answered when six pirates were captured and taken prisoner. Before their execution, he both "bestowed the best instructions" he could and prayed with them. After preaching to the pirates, Mather wanted them to "provide examples and warnings" to the crowd awaiting the executions to "affirm the values of Christianity."

Ministers advocated that children should be "protected" from this rebellious lifestyle and should be "kept from going to sea." Many ministers felt that pursuing religion while at sea would be "impossible to sustain as long as sailors took the name of the Lord in vain." Minister John Flavel also made the point that the sea was a place "with strange creatures" where sins proliferated and "death was omnipresent." Flavel continued that seamen were "to be numbered neither with the living nor the dead, their lives hanging continually in suspense before them."

Life at sea was tough, which could make men to feel their "own insignificance and dependence upon the almighty God." There were even societies and organizations that promoted religion to sailors along the waterfronts, such as "The Marine Bible Society of New York, the Seamen in the Port of New York (SPGAS), and the American Seamen's Friend Society (ASFS).

Pirates were viewed as godless individuals, and yet "the closest thing to" a "pirate constitution" was New England "puritan church 'covenants,'" just without the acceptance of the divine. "God-fearing people" claimed that pirates were "devils" and "bound for hell." Some pirates, such as Blackbeard, embraced this belief by inverting "the values of Christianity," casting themselves in a way that "society understood to be evil," and even to the embrace of Lucifer.

=== Legal system ===
Prior to the mid-17th century, how Atlantic pirates were treated under the law broadly adhered to a 1559 treaty between France and Spain which laid out the "no peace beyond the line" rule, meaning that hostilities in New World waters (anything west of the Azores) was not governed by European norms. However, as Spain gradually lost hegemonic control of the Atlantic, this policy fell out of use, and British laws became highly important in the legal world of piracy.

The early 17th century saw a more coherent legal view of piracy take shape, with the work Mare Liberum (Free Sea) by Dutch jurist and polymath Hugo Grotius attempting to draw a legal distinction between "privateers" with letters of marque from "pirates". Grotius also attempted to brand Spain and Portugal's dominance of the sea as a form of piracy in itself, as it attempted to "blockade the seas".

The late 17th century saw a major shift in British policy, accompanying their rise as a maritime power. However, Britain itself had multiple competing legal systems that could claim jurisdiction over piracy. The legal system of the English during the late seventeenth century was built upon common law (Offences at Sea Act 1536 (28 Hen. 8. c. 15)). This allowed circumstantial evidence to be admissible but also forced the captured to be transferred to England where the law was enforceable. This made it burdensome for the colonial governments to enforce extradition. Additionally, Common law's emphasis on local courts, the right to a jury of peers, and different treatment of Englishmen and foreigners clashed with the international nature of piracy. Foreign pirates preyed on British ships and vice versa, and piracy often took place in waters outside British dominion, although the nationality of those involved might be British. Complicating matters was the British crown's insistence on judging any piracy case that involved a British subject in any way. The inadequacies of common law led to the adoption of the Admiralty Law system, a system originating in the Middle Ages, to govern cases of piracy.

During the 17th century, after Jamaica had become a haven for pirates, Henry Morgan was selected as deputy governor. During this period, there was debate among English scholars about the jurisdiction of the 1536 acts. Jamaica had one of the first laws to deliver justice with royal legitimacy. It became known as "The Jamaica Act." 1683 would mark the beginning of aggressive anti-piracy laws. The increasingly anti-piratical policy of the Jamaican government started an exodus from Jamaica. This law was the only one of its kind in the Caribbean or North American colonies and it simply forced the buccaneers and pirates out, into the Carolinas, New York, and the Bahamas.

Bradley Nutting argues that it was the early Golden Age pirate attacks on several Muslim pilgrim ships in 1695 that were initially responsible for the flood of legislation in the early eighteenth century. Following Henry Avery's capture of the mogul ship quote, the East India Company petitioned the Privy Council in 1696 to issue a proclamation of arrest. A reward of fifty pounds was offered for Avery's crew, while five-hundred pounds was offered for Avery himself. Those incidents led to two major acts of Parliament which reshaped British policy towards piracy both in Britain itself and in the colonies.

The Plantation Trade Act 1695 moved responsibility for prosecuting piracy from central British authorities to colonial governments, establishing colonial vice-admiralty courts to create uniformity. Prior to this act, there was considerable variance in the existence and enforcement of anti-piracy laws between Britain and her colonies and between the colonies themselves. The Piracy Act 1698 made all acts of piracy "triable" either at sea or in the newly created colonial admiralty courts, suspended the right to a jury trial for those accused of piracy, and encouraged British colonies to double down against piracy.

The Piracy Act 1698 took two years to pass after repeated pressure from the East India Company and the Board of Trade. There was now authorization to set up vice-admiralty courts throughout the colonies with legal authority to carry out sentencing. The first notable pirate to be brought to trial under this new set of laws was Captain Kidd. Kidd was denied an adequate defense and the opportunity to review documents he claimed would exonerate him. Ironically, he was acquitted of piracy, but convicted of murder. Regardless, he was executed and his body was hung in chains over the River Thames for years.

After the end of the War of Spanish Succession (1701–1714) and the Peace of Utrecht legal privateers working for a legitimately recognized government simple turned to piracy. As many politicians feared, the privateering strategy of war backfired. Corruption of local officials was also a problem for authorities. Edward Teach (Blackbeard) bribed the colonial governor of North Carolina to avoid prosecution.

An increased effort to combat piracy with naval forces, effectively stamped out piracy. This combination of laws and naval efforts was responsible for thousands of deaths of pirates and alleged pirates. In a time when royal mercy and pardons in England routinely commuted death penalties to lesser sentences, especially one or another form of bound labor (after the Transportation Act 1717), pirates rarely had their sentences lessened and instead were hanged in huge numbers and high percentages.

=== Pirates on trial ===
Pirates often considered the court trials which awaited many of them to be little more than shams. On at least one occasion, the pirates of Antis' crew staged a comedic mock trial that satirized the legal system as unjust, bloodthirsty, and stacked against them. However, in many cases, suspects accused of piracy could call favorable witnesses, challenge jury selection, and produce documents in their favor. In some cases, notably the trial of Capt. William Kidd, the suspect was even granted professional legal counsel. Even after the Act for the More Effectual Suppression of Piracy abolished the necessity of a jury in piracy trials, trials often were decided by juries rather than judges. At the same time, judges in piracy trials interfered to tip the scales against a suspected pirate, helping ensure their execution by hanging. However, despite this, pirate trials were not entirely one-sided, and pirates on multiple occasions secured non-guilty verdicts in courts.

==== List of pirate trials ====
Three examples of pirate trials:

- Trial of George Cusack and Crew (1676)
- Trial of Crompton Guyther and Crew (1680)
- Trial of the Privateer Savannah on Charge of Piracy (1861)

=== Naval enforcement ===
It was not until Britain settled the War of the Spanish Succession through the Treaty of Utrecht in 1713 that Britain could make a serious attempt to deploy its navy against piracy. By 1718, the Royal Navy was refit for action against the pirates and with third, fourth, and fifth-rate warships armed with some seventy plus guns--this was more firepower than any pirate ship of the time could have withstood. As David Cordingly argues, the pirates were "no match for naval squadrons of this strength," and the only reason piracy had been so successful was because the British government had not put this level of effort into hunting pirates before.

Two well known naval actions against pirates were the successful defeats of Edward Teach (Blackbeard) and Bartholomew Roberts. In 1718, off the coast of North Carolina at the Ocracoke Inlet, Teach's ship was at anchor and surprised by Lieutenant Maynard of the Royal Navy. Maynard and Teach engaged each other with small arms and cannon until the ships were close enough to board; Maynard boarded the pirate ship to fight Teach, and the notorious pirate eventually fell. Blackbeard's death became the stuff of legend and was used by the Royal Navy in its propaganda campaign in eliminating piracy.

In 1721, the infamous pirate Captain Roberts was cornered off the coast of Africa by a Captain Ogle in HMS Swallow, a fifty-gun warship. Roberts was converting a group of French ships that he had captured for his own use when Swallow sailed up to engage. Roberts would fight Ogle despite being outmanned and outgunned; he fell during the battle. With arguably the most famous pirates of the time gone and the American coast and Caribbean swarming with the Royal Navy and privateers hired by governors of the American colonies, piracy was systematically hunted to near extinction.

=== The punishment for piracy ===
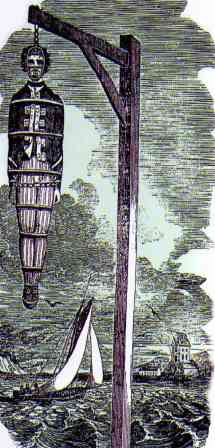
Captain Kidd's corpse displayed after his execution

In the 17th and 18th centuries, piracy was defined as any criminal act committed on the high seas. This means that many of those accused of piracy were criminals but not necessarily a member of a crew of sailors capturing ships. William Wood who was convicted and hanged for taking his captains money after he and another sailor got in an argument with him and threw him overboard.

Johnson published the statute relating to piracy in the early 18th century in A General History of the Pirates. The crime was differentiated from wartime privateering in the statute and defined who was punishable in very specific terms. If convicted, the prescribed punishment was "Death without Benefit of Clergy and forfeit Land and Goods." The statute was applicable to the American colonies, but Scotland was excluded. A death sentence could be carried out on captured pirates at sea without benefit of trial according to the statute. Often clergy were called in to advise the prisoner in the time before his death, or someone else fulfilled this role.

In the text, Johnson describes the punishments meted out on captured pirates. Public execution by hanging was typical, although some were given lesser sentences such as indentures if the court was unconvinced of their complicity with the pirate mission or if there were other extenuating circumstances. Bodies were also sometimes displayed after the execution. Executions in the early 18th century were somewhat common throughout the Atlantic world, and there were hundreds of crimes that could lead to execution.

The Admiralty Courts and men like Cotton Mather used these very public punishments such as putting executed men on displayed at many of the ports they once looted or called home in the New World in an effort to regain some of their power.

=== Ghost ships ===
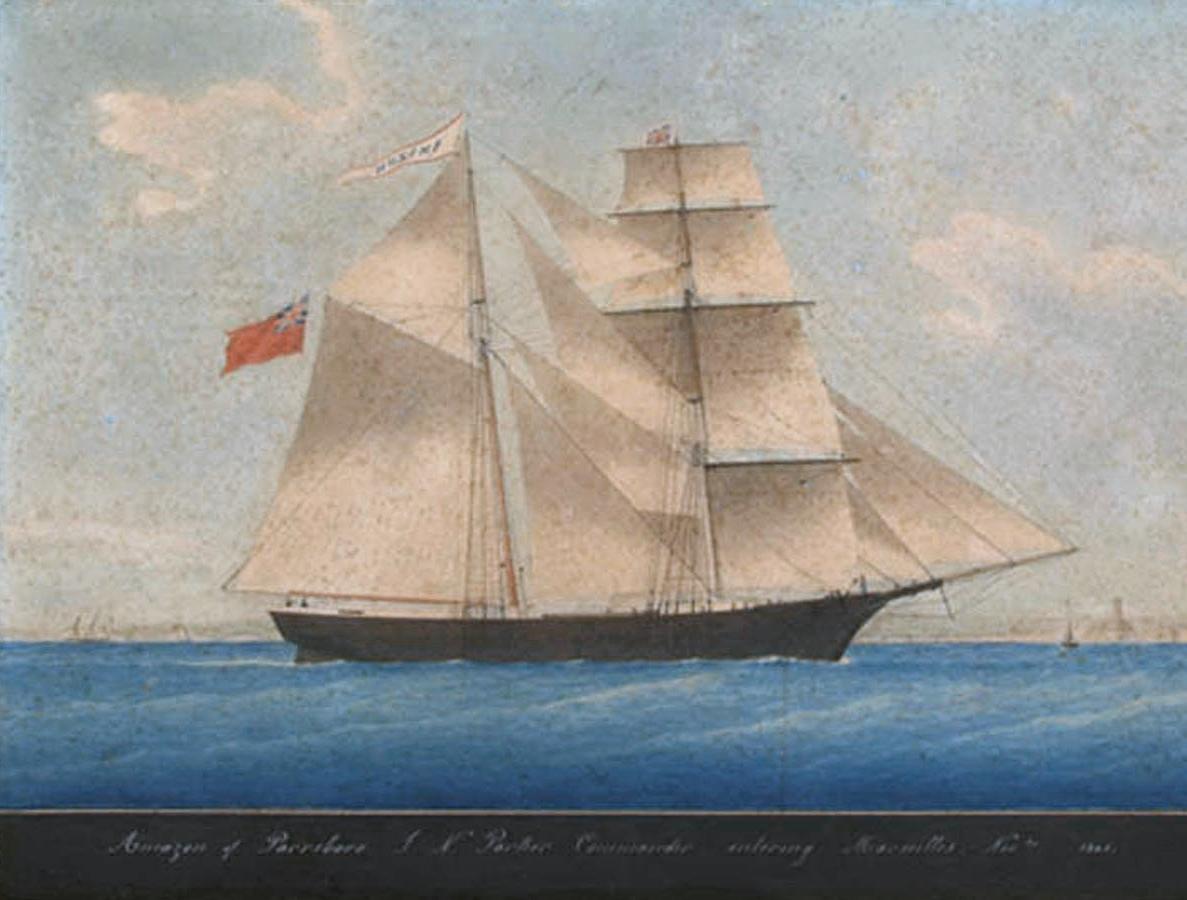
The Amazon in 1861, later the Mary Celeste

The term "ghost ship" is a long-standing seafaring term for "any vessel found sailing without her crew." Supernatural powers are bound to surface in any discussion of ghost ships. One well-known ghost ship was the Flying Dutchman that was said to be continuously exploring for "safe harbor" and was condemned to eternally "haunt the cape."

It was not unusual for a crew to abandon their ship in times of "sinking," by use of lifeboats or another vessel. Occasionally whole crews might have been "swept overboard" in rough weather, but the vessel would be destroyed enough to explain the crew's fate. Even less frequently, ships could be overtaken by pirates or from a mutiny within the crew. During this time, the crew would be "abducted and forced" to man other vessels.

In 1735, the ship Baltimore was found anchored in Chebogue, Nova Scotia. The people of the town speculated about the "supernatural powers" that guided the vacant ship. After an investigation aboard the ship occurred, the men noticed the deck "was awash with blood." Once inside, the men found a woman who described how "local Indians" murdered the crew. After this, the ship was abandoned as not a single person "wanted to buy it, sail it, or even go aboard." Some time passed before the locals learned the crew was actually murdered by the prisoners being carried in the vessel, and the woman was one of ten inmates who had survived.

An unknown ghost ship was seen in 1785; the vessel had "no sails" and "no crew" with "fifteen Africans on board." Based on their desolate condition, it was deemed their time on board the ship had been lengthy. A "shipboard rebellion" might have occurred in which the crew had perished along with some Africans. In this scenario, it is possible that none of the survivors understood "how to sail the vessel and they slowly starved to death". In the twentieth century, the ship Carroll A. Deering was found in the Atlantic with no crew aboard. The lifeboats were missing and the theories surrounding the ship included "piracy, mutiny, and insurance fraud."

The most notorious of all ghost ships is the Mary Celeste – it has been called "the greatest maritime mystery of all time." The ship was found wet after a storm by the crew of Dei Gratia, because the ship was opened to air out. One theory is that the crew needed to air out the ship from chemical fumes from the alcohol. The crew had left everything because they "expected to come back" to the vessel after the fumes had cleared. They got off the ship temporarily and waited for the ship to air out in their "small yawl," but the weather changed before they were able to get back to the vessel. The crew of eight men, a mother and child "watched, helplessly" as the ghost ship sailed away without her crew.

=== Attitude toward death ===
On every voyage a sailor would face the risk of falling overboard, drowning, starving, or dying of disease, abuse, accidents in the rigging, or attack. Once a sailor abandoned his law-abiding career to become a pirate he knowingly increased his chance of expediting his own death exponentially. Once convicted as a pirate, a sailor faced an almost certain demise of being hanged at the execution docks.

While on trial in Charleston, the pirate Job Bayley was asked why he had attacked several warships that were sent to capture him, he answered that "We thought it had been a pirate." At yet another trial in London, the pirate John Bayley comically played dumb when the Judge asked what he would have done if the warship that apprehended him was nothing more than a merchant ship answering, "I don't know what I would have done." Both men knew that their fate was sealed the moment they were apprehended and both in turn were hanged at the gallows.

The story of pirate William Fly, who was executed on July 12, 1726, in Boston illustrates how arrogantly many pirates viewed death. He showed no anxiety over his imminent demise but rather tied his own noose and lectured the hangman about the proper way to tie the knot. Right before he swung off to his death, he delivered a warning to all ships captains and owners that in order to prevent their crews from mutinying and resorting to piracy, they would be wise to pay their crews on time and treat them humanely.

Some pirates preferred to control their own fate. Pairs of pirates would at times make oaths to one another to insure that in the event either were captured they would shoot each other. The crew of Bartholomew Roberts preferred not to be taken alive and swore to blow themselves up rather than give the authorities the satisfaction of seeing them hanged. When Roberts and his men were finally found, an attempt was made to blow the ship up rather than face capture; however, it was in vain because there wasn't enough gunpowder. Edward Teach's (Blackbeard's) crew also failed to detonate their sloop when facing capture. However, the pirate Joseph Cooper and his crew successfully blew themselves up and evaded capture by the authorities.

During the 17th and 18th centuries, execution in the British realm was commonplace and a part of life. During the 17th century alone, around 800 people were hanged each year in the British Empire. However, for a pirate, the odds of finding yourself on the gallows were much higher. In just the ten-year span between 1716 and 1726, at least 418 pirates, and possibly as much as half again more, were hanged. In this world, a pirate could be nearly certain that if caught he would end up hanged.

The gallows were iconic in the 17th and 18th century and could be readily found throughout the Atlantic world. The gallows were particular visible in port cities that routinely featured an execution dock such as "Hope Point" the famous execution dock on the river Thames in Wapping, England. For many pirates this would be the place that their career ended. However, for some, their body would serve one more function, as a reminder. Hundreds of pirates were hanged and their bodies left to dangle in port cities around the world as a reminder that the maritime state would not tolerate a challenge from below. Examples of this barbarous practice can be seen throughout pirate history, including those of William Fly, whose body was hung in chains at the entrance of Boston Harbor to rot, and John Rackham, whose body was gibbeted on a cay near Port Royal, Jamaica.

== Implications ==
=== Trials ===
Pirate trials were overseen by the Court of Admiralty rather than civil courts. The Court of Admiralty "held mass trials" with "large numbers of pirates at one time" as demonstrations to those interested in taking on a pirate's life. The trial transcripts were frequently published, and confessions by those who were to be executed were "very popular." The publication of the trials was intended "to inform, enlighten, and entertain the reading public" as well as "make a profit for the book sellers." Reprints of trials were a common occurrence in order to gain political strength. Though the trials took place in English, they were transcribed in Latin as a way to further remove the public from the transcription's truth and to use it as propaganda. Much of these pamphlets were repetitive as many of the statements and arguments were the same, just with different names. Trials were also a place of humor: Job Bayley, who was facing execution for being a pirate, stated that he had not stopped for the government vessels because he had feared the ships were pirates.

Usually, the trials took place in England because the "Admiralty feared that officials in the far-flung outposts of the empire could be bribed." However, an issue with holding trials in England was that the pirates would have to be transported "across vast distances." The law regarding piracy trials was changed at the beginning of the eighteenth century, granting more relaxed rules and allowing for trials to take place in British colonies so long as a Court of Admiralty was available. Pirates faced greater danger of being executed when the law changed as it stated if a pirate was taken at sea, an official trial was not necessary, but the result of execution was to be the same. An act in 1700 allowed for the expansion of the definition of piracy to include not just those "who committed robbery by sea," but also the "mutineer who ran away with the ship" and the "sailor who interfered with the defense of his vessel" under a pirate siege.

In both 1717 and 1718, pardons were granted in order to "rid the sea of robbers." For example, Israel Hands, Blackbeard's henchman, was taken with fifteen other pirates to Williamsburg, Virginia, to stand trial. In exchange for a pardon, Hands testified against corrupt North Carolina officials with whom Teach had consorted. The minutes of the North Carolina Governor's Council for May 27, 1719, state; Hesikia Hands[,] master of Capt Thaches Sloop Adventure[,] seems to swear positively in his Deposition that the said Thache went from Ocacoch Inlet at his return into this Country from his last voyage with a present to the said Tobias Knights house [,] when by the same deposition [Hands] acknowledgth that to be out of the reach of his knowledge[,] he being all the time at the said Inlet which lyes at above thirty leagues distance from [Knight's] house and further the [said] Tobias Knight doth pray your Honors to observe that the aforsd Hesikias Hands was . . . for some time before the giving of the [said] Evidence kept in prison under the Terrors of Death a most severe prosecution . . . . Many stipulations came with these pardons, as they were only granted in certain instances and few surrendered. The few who "accepted the amnesty" would eventually return to their pirate ways. Death was also promised to those found helping pirates, and the "loss of wages" and "six months' imprisonment was promised to those who refused to defend their ship." Instead of having black pirates stand trial, colonial officials would profit "by selling them into slavery rather than hanging them."

Trials for women pirates were not uniform in sentencing and punishment. Mary Harvey, whose alias was Martha Farley, was sentenced in North Carolina in the year 1726. Both Mary and her husband Thomas had joined a pirate gang, and shortly thereafter Mary was captured. Because North Carolina lacked the infrastructure to try pirates, Mary and three others were sent to Williamsburg. Mary "was acquitted and given money to return home" as the court deemed she had been coerced into joining the pirate gang. Two of the other captives were not as lucky and were "condemned to die." The third captive was pardoned. Three years later, another female pirate, Mary Crickett, along with five others, was ordered to be executed. When Mary Read and Anne Bonny were convicted of piracy, they faced execution. However, after claiming to be pregnant, they were granted a reprieve. Mary Read eventually perished in jail around April 1721. Anne Bonny's fate is unknown.

== Pirates in memory ==
=== A General History of the Pirates ===
In 1724, the first edition of A General History of Robberies and Murders of the Most Notorious Pirates was published. The author was listed as a Captain Charles Johnson, whose real name is unknown. However, what is most important about this work is not who penned it but that it represents what people thought about pirates in the early eighteenth century. A General History of the Pirates set the tone for every work on pirates written since.

=== Pirates as the anti-hero ===
Pirates were not members of society; they operated outside the social norms that allowed buccaneers and privateers to remain within the bounds of a society. The key reason they cannot be grouped with any social order is because they embraced terror, and particularly as Marcus Rediker phrased it, "a terror of the strong against the weak." Historian Hans Turley used the phrase Hostis Humani Generis (enemy of all mankind) to describe pirates. Pirates became the "antiheroes" of history, and they did so consciously. Eventually, the governments of the known world made villains of these sea raiders, calling them "blood lusting monsters," whose sole purpose was "destroying the social order."

The pirates would attack merchant shipping from any nation, plundering the wealth of the ship, and, most of the time, sinking or burning a great number of ships that fell into their hands. Revenge was sought against merchant captains and officers who were known to have been cruel or unreasonable in the treatment of their crew, often through torture and slow death. A few pirates would even attack slave ships and slave fortresses on the African coast to take slaves (though generally speaking, pirates would free slaves they encountered), for whom they knew some governments would pay for in gold coin; most notably the Portuguese.

Hans Turley looks to the literary evidence of pirates, and in particular Captain Avery, when drawing the conclusion of the pirate as the "antihero." Avery's story became the stuff of legend to the masses, and the "fictional exaggeration" of Avery cemented in the minds of the readers the image of a brute bent on theft, ransom, and power. Turley assures us that the stories were lifted beyond the realm of reality, but it is impossible to know for sure who the real Captain Avery was, and it was legitimate to believe the stories due to the lack of any evidence to the contrary.

An attack on commerce and shipping meant an attack on the governments to whom these ships belonged. Governments stopped turning a blind eye to these bandits when the costs of ignoring them outweighed attacking the pirate, and so a "campaign to cleanse the seas," was put into effect by governments, lawyers, businessmen, writers, and other members of legitimate society.

Marcus Rediker argues that religion was another point of contention for pirates who saw the church as a piece of the system they wanted to escape. The Pirate was seen as existing in sin by those who lived in normal social constructs, and he relished the separation, likening himself to hellish images and Satan. As an example, Blackbeard had smoke, fire, and ash bellowing from his large bead to give the impression of a demon from hell itself, as Johnson describes him. Pirates would mock and ridicule men of the cloth who they came in contact with and did not observe Christian holidays.

With their attacks on private property, belief systems, and governments, pirates became outcasts to the realm of the unknown and dangerous. Their realm on the sea, as Rediker suggests, aided in the view of the pirate as a danger, a threat of invasion, and uncontrollable entity; just as the sea was to those who both knew the sea and had only heard tales. It was the sea that was separated from authority and thus was the pirate who could attack those who entered the oceans.

=== Sources of information about Pirates ===
Scholars consider many sources of information during their research. Firsthand information about piracy is relatively rare, and scholars often pull from the same texts when compiling their data. During the late seventeenth and early eighteenth centuries, narratives of sea captains and pirate adventures took many forms.

- Books: Piracy inspired many books during the Golden Age. Books like The Buccaneers of America by Alexandre Exquemelin, first published in 1678, and A General History of the Pirates by Captain Charles Johnson, published in 1724, were extremely popular, often earning many editions and reprints. These stories provided insight into a mysterious subculture in the Atlantic World while shedding light on how the public often viewed piracy.
- Trial Records: When pirates were put on trial in Admiralty or Vice Admiralty courts, unofficial records of the proceedings were frequently published in pamphlet form. Official records were also kept and can be accessed by scholars today, but the pamphlets were created to be sold and the accounts were easily sensationalized to attract buyers. These records of the trials showed the public examples of the law and its triumphs over the crimes of piracy. The pirates themselves were often secondary characters in these narratives.
- Religious Sermons: Messages by ministers like Cotton Mather warning against piracy were intended to scare the public into social submission. These sermons would emphasize the crimes of accused men and show piracy to be the "antithesis" of the desired Christian way of life. Ministers detailed the sins of piracy and called for repentance in their execution sermons, using fear of damnation to further chastise onlookers and exhort clean living.
- Newspapers and Periodicals: Newspapers also published information regarding pirates, their captures, and their trials, as they did other news of the day.
- Archaeology is increasingly providing another perspective on piracy. Pirate shipwrecks such as Queen Anne's Revenge (used by Blackbeard), Whydah Gally (used by Samuel Bellamy), and Quedagh Merchant (used by William Kidd) have been excavated. Pirate land bases such as the underwater section of Port Royal, Jamaica; the Spanish part of St Augustine; and Old Panama (the site of Henry Morgan's 1670 raid) have been analyzed to provide additional information about pirates and their interactions with the rest of the Atlantic world.

=== Pirates in dime novels ===
A dime novel is sensationalist fiction originating in the 1860s. Irwin P. Beadle & Company standardized these books into a format that contemporary readers could easily identify at newsstands and in book catalogues. They had a yellowish orange cover that often feature a woodcut illustration. Dime novels were very popular and had a wide readership. During the Civil War Beadle & Company shipped the books by the crate to the army and by mid-1965 they had published between 35,000 and 80,000 copies. There are several comprehensive indices of published titles, but the most prominent is the work of Albert Johannsen. This is a two volume work with detailed information with lists of titles and authorial biographies. Popular themes for dime novels included stories of the Wild West, the American Revolution, Indians, and pirates.

=== The Whydah galley: slave ship to pirate ship ===
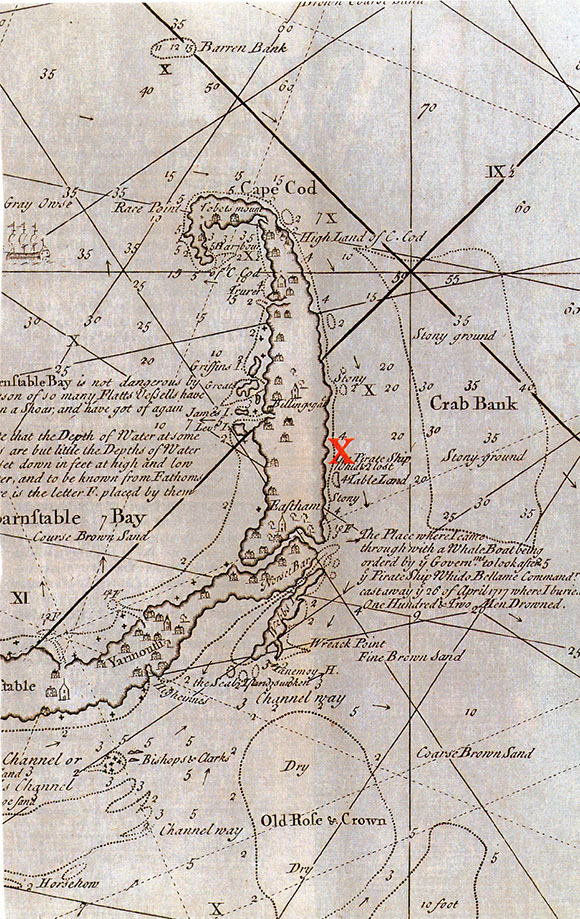
Location of the Whydah Gally, which sank in 1717 off of Cape Cod. Red X marks the spot.

Built in London in 1715, the Whydah Gally was a 300-ton galley originally commissioned for use in the slave trade. The Whydah left on her maiden voyage to the coast of Africa in 1716. After selling a cargo of slaves to in Jamaica, the Whydah was heading home to London with a new cargo of gold and silver when she was captured by Samuel Bellamy in 1717. In the spring of 1717, Bellamy and his crew sailed North intending to clean the ship, divide the spoils, and determine the future of the crew. The Whydah was caught in a storm and capsized off the coast of Cape Cod. The Whydah was rediscovered in 1984 by Barry Clifford, a salvage diver and Cape Cod native.

==== Controversy ====
Controversy surrounded the Whydah long before Clifford brought up the first artifacts. In 1982, the state of Massachusetts filed a claim of ownership on the Whydah treasure. After a long battle through a succession of courts, sole ownership of the Whydah was granted to Clifford in 1988. This was only the beginning of the troubles for the Whydah artifacts. New troubles arose when Silver Screen Entertainment directors, Tom Bernstein and Roland Betts proposed the concept for developing a large-scale museum complex devoted to the Whydah. The museum was offered to the city of Boston where controversy surrounding the Whydah's history as a slave ship had already made waves with local government officials. The proposal for the museum included plans for a full-scale replica of the ship, a holographic image of Samuel Bellamy, a conservation viewing area, interpretation of artifacts, a play acting out pirate hangings, and an exploration of the Whydah's history as a slave ship. Concern was raised that a "theme park" was being built around the concept of a slave ship. State representative Byron Rushing compared this concept to building a "theme park based on a concentration camp." Ultimately developers Bernstein and Betts decided that the political atmosphere of Boston was to unsteady on the issue. Having ended negotiations with Boston, Bernstein and Betts looked to Tampa as a possible location for the complex.

The Tampa debate unwound in a similar manner to the one in Boston. Opposition to the Whydah complex was spearheaded by Tampa Lawyer Warren Dawson, who voiced concerns that slavery was trivialized through an association with piracy. A panel of historians was convened to discuss the issue of interpreting the Whydah's slave history. After careful review of the project, the panel decided that the Whydah complex could effectively interpret slavery, but the decision created more public controversy. After months of negotiations and compromises, the Tampa community was still divided over the potential implications of a Whydah museum. In mid-July 1993, the developers officially announced that they were pulling the project from Tampa.

The Tampa community's feelings about the Whydah have mellowed little. In 2006 the controversy flared again when the Museum of Science and Industry (MOSI) attempted to host the traveling exhibit of the Whydah artifacts sponsored by National Geographic. After several conferences with area leaders, MOSI decided not to host the exhibit. Philip Levy argues that the Whydah exhibit would have provided opportunity to explore connections between Atlantic pirates and slavery. The actions of Atlantic pirates, who often attacked slave ships and forts, created a crisis in the transatlantic slave trade. These actions were so detrimental that they led European authorities on both sides of the Atlantic to view pirates as a "fearsome enemy" and a "great threat."

=== Pirates as historical subject ===
In the nineteenth century, writings about piracy mostly consisted of the reprinting of source materials with little if any commentary or interpretation. Reprinting ensured that historians remained objective, and that the grand pirate narratives remained intact. The big names of buccaneers and pirates like Captain Morgan and Blackbeard were major players in those stories. In the first part of the twentieth century, scholars who did not present faithful reprints, published books on piracy that were little more than rewriting the same well-known stories.

The evolution of the history of piracy mirrors that of many other subjects. As historians began to stray from the strict retelling of these stories, piracy became more significant. In the latter part of the twentieth century, historians began to see the Atlantic World in early modern times as an important frame in telling stories of colonialism, capitalism, slavery, and modernity.

In recent historiographical works, pirates have been viewed through various lenses. Modern scholars have posited many reasons for the rise in piracy in the early eighteenth century, from a growing social emphasis on economics and capitalism to rebellion against an oppressive upper class. Recent academic books on piracy in the Atlantic World focus on the pirates and their relationships with the wider world.

== See also ==
- Thalassocracy
- Atlantic history
- Atlantic World

== Footnotes ==
- Senior, Clive M. (1976). A Nation of Pirates. Newton Abbot: David & Charles. ISBN 0-7153-7264-5.
