= Mary Terrall =

American academic and science historian (1952–2023)

- Born: April 10, 1952; Sharon, Connecticut, U.S.
- Died: September 11, 2023 (aged 71)
- Education: Harvard University (BA); University of California, Los Angeles (PhD)
- Occupations: Professor; Science historian

Mary Terrall (April 10, 1952 – September 11, 2023) was an American academic and science historian. She specialized in the 18th century.

== Biography ==
Born in Sharon, Connecticut on April 10, 1952, Terrall earned a Bachelor of Arts from Harvard University and a doctorate from the University of California, Los Angeles.

The central theme of Terrall's research is the science of the 18th Century. She wrote articles on the various subjects of scientific culture in Berlin during the time of Frederick the Great and French science in the Age of Enlightenment. She also took an interest in vis visa, a theory at the origin of the laws of conservation of energy. She notably wrote a book and several articles on Pierre Louis Maupertuis, a French philosopher, mathematician, physicist, astronomer, and naturalist of the 18th Century who contributed to the various theories of Isaac Newton and formulated the stationary-action principle. Maupertuis also led the French Geodesic Mission to the Equator.

Terrall also described and analyzed the way Maupertuis used literary techniques to recount his expedition to Lapland in the form of an adventure story, so as to interest a wider audience. She wrote an article describing his use of anonymity when publishing controversial work, though presenting it as neutral. Additionally, she took an interest in the work of René Antoine Ferchault de Réaumur and the way in which he and other naturalists used literary techniques to tell narratives on animal behaviors.

Mary Terrall died on September 11, 2023, at tConception71.

== Awards ==
1994: Derek Price Award (now the Price/Webster Prize) for "Representing the Earth’s Shape: The Polemics Surrounding Maupertuis’s Expedition to Lapland"

1998: Margaret W. Rossiter History of Women in Science Prize for "Emilie du Châtelet and the Gendering of Science" (1995)

2003: Pfizer Award from the History of Science Society for The Man Who Flattened the Earth: Maupertuis and the Sciences in the Enlightenment

2004: Gottschalk Prize from the American Society for Eighteenth-Century Studies for The Man Who Flattened the Earth: Maupertuis and the Sciences in the Enlightenment

== Publications ==
=== Books ===
- The Man Who Flattened the Earth: Maupertuis and the Sciences in the Enlightenment (2002)
- Catching Nature in the Act: Réaumur and the Practice of Natural History in the Eighteenth Century (2014)
- Vital Matters: Eighteenth-Century Views of Conception, Lfe and Death, co-edited with Helen Deutsch (2012)
- Curious Encounters: Voyaging, Collecting, and Making Knowledge in the Long Eighteenth Century, co-edited with Adriana Craciun (2019)

=== Articles ===
- "Representing the Earth’s Shape: The Polemics Surrounding Maupertuis’s Expedition to Lapland." (1992)
- "Emilie du Châtelet and the Gendering of Science" (1995)
- "Heroic Narratives of Quest and Discovery" (1998)
- "Metaphysics, Mathematics and the Gendering of Science in France" (1999)
- "Fashionable Readers of Natural Philosophy" (2000)
- "Biography as Cultural History of Science" (2006)
- "Speculation and Experiment in Enlightenment Life Sciences" (2007)
- "Following Insects Around: Tools and Techniques of Natural History in the Eighteenth Century" (2010)
- "Circulation and Locality in Early Modern Science" (2010)
- "Frogs on the Mantelpiece: The Practice of Observation in Daily Life" (2011)
