= Keck-Gottschalk-Keck Apartments =

Apartment building in Chicago, Illinois

Coordinates: 41.7935°N 87.5978°W

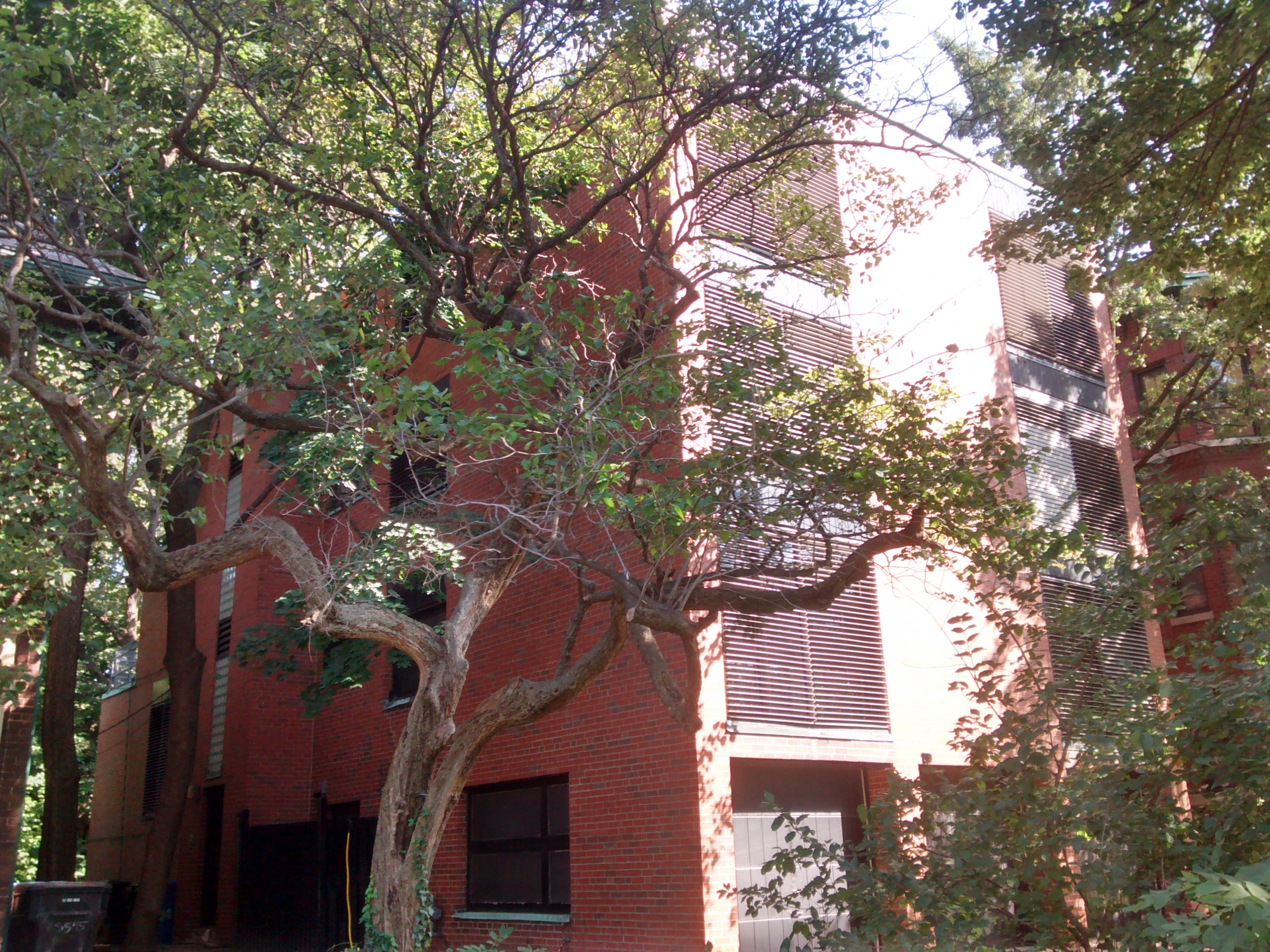
The Keck-Gottschalk-Keck Apartments in September 2014

The Keck-Gottschalk-Keck Apartments comprise a 1931 International Style three-flat in Chicago, Illinois. They were designed by George and William Keck and served as residences for the architects and for University of Chicago professor Louis Gottschalk. The apartments received Chicago Landmark status on August 3, 1994.
