= Farmers and Fishermen: Two Centuries of Work in Essex County, Massachusetts, 1630–1850 =

Economics publication

- Author: Daniel Vickers
- Language: English
- Series: New Edition
- Genre: Historical, Non-Fiction
- Publisher: Omohundro Institute and University of North Carolina Press
- Publication date: December 31st 1994
- Media type: Paperback
- Pages: 372
- ISBN: 978-0807844588

Farmers and Fishermen: Two Centuries of Work in Essex County, Massachusetts, 1630–1850 is a book by Canadian historian Daniel Vickers, first published in 1994. It analyzes and contrasts the economic roles of farmers and fishermen in early New England communities.

It won the 1995 John H. Dunning Prize as well as the 1994–95 Louis Gottschalk Prize from the American Society for Eighteenth-Century Studies.

== Content ==
In the book, Vickers examines how a patriarchal system that relied on the unpaid labor of dependent sons transitioned gradually to an economic system in which these sons found work outside of the family farm. For fishermen, he explores the shift from client-patron economic relations to a free market system, noting the difficulties fishermen faced in achieving economic independence in both systems.

== In popular culture ==
In the 1997 film Good Will Hunting, the title character cites page 98 of the book during a history-of-economics debate in a Harvard Square barroom.

== See also ==
- Essex County, Massachusetts § History
