= Louis R. Gottschalk =

American historian (1899–1975)

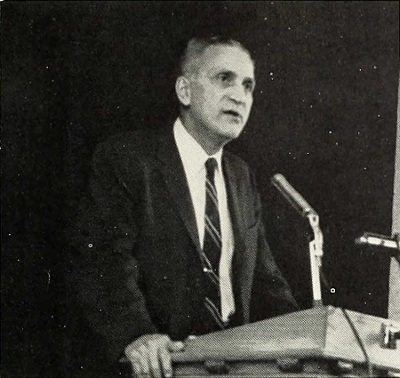
- Gottschalk, c. 1959
- Born: Louis Gottschalk; February 21, 1899; Brooklyn, New York City, U.S.
- Died: June 23, 1975 (aged 76); Chicago, Illinois, U.S.

Academic background
- Education: Cornell University (A.B., A.M., Ph.D.)

Academic work
- Discipline: History, History of the French Revolution
- Institutions: University of Illinois, University of Louisville, University of Chicago, University of Illinois at Chicago

Louis Reichenthal Gottschalk (February 21, 1899 – June 23, 1975) was an American historian, an expert on the Marquis de Lafayette and the French Revolution. He taught at the University of Chicago, where he was the Gustavus F. and Ann M. Swift Distinguished Service Professor of History.

== Early life and education ==
He was born Louis Gottschalk, the sixth of eight children of Morris and Anna (née Krystal) Gottschalk, Jewish immigrants in Brooklyn from Poland. He graduated from Cornell University with an A.B. in 1919, A.M. in 1920, and the Ph.D. in 1921, under the supervision of Carl L. Becker.

== Career ==
During World War I, he served as an apprentice seaman from October 4, 1918, to November 11, 1918, a total of thirty eight days, at the Naval Unit at Cornell in Ithaca, New York. He taught briefly at the University of Illinois, and joined the University of Louisville faculty in 1923, but resigned in protest in 1927 after a friend and colleague in the history department was fired as part of an attempt by the university administration to abolish tenure.

In 1927, he joined the University of Chicago, where he was promoted to full professor in 1935, and chaired the history department from 1937 to 1942. He was given his endowed chair, the Gustavus F. and Ann M. Swift Distinguished Service Professorship of History, in 1959. In 1965, facing forced retirement from Chicago, he moved again to the University of Illinois at Chicago so that he could continue teaching.

From 1929 to 1943, he served as assistant editor of The Journal of Modern History for three years and then as acting editor. He was president of the American Historical Association in 1953 and the second president of the American Society for Eighteenth-Century Studies. He was a member of the American Friends of Lafayette.

== Awards and honors ==
Gottschalk was a Guggenheim Fellow in 1928 and 1954, and a Center for Advanced study of the Behavioral Sciences fellow in 1957. In 1953 he was honored as Chevalier in the Legion of Honor and in 1954 he won a Fulbright award. He received honorary doctorates from the University of Toulouse, Hebrew Union College, and the University of Louisville. In 1965 his students presented him with a festschrift, Ideas in History: Essays Presented to Louis Gottschalk by his Former Students, Duke University Press.

Gottschalk was an elected member of the American Academy of Arts and Sciences and the American Philosophical Society.

A series of lectures is named for him at the University of Louisville. The annual $1000 Louis Gottschalk Prize, named in his honor, is given by the American Society for Eighteenth-Century Studies to the author of "an outstanding historical or critical study".

== Works ==
Gottschalk's papers are held at the University of Chicago. He books include seven volumes on the Marquis de Lafayette and several books on modern history and revolutions, including:

- The Consulate of Napoleon Bonaparte, Haldeman-Julius Co., 1925; Kessinger Publishing, 2007 ISBN 978-1-4325-8611-9
- The Era of the French Revolution (1715–1815), Houghton Mifflin Company, 1929; Surjeet Publications, 1979 Gottschalk, Louis R. (1968) [1931]. "The French Revolution: Conspiracy of Circumstance?". Persecution and Liberty: Essays in Honor of George Lincoln Burr. Ayer Publishing. ISBN 978-0-8369-0783-4.
- Jean Paul Marat: A Study in Radicalism New York: Greenberg, Publisher, Inc. 1927; Ayer Company Publishers, Incorporated, 1972 ISBN 978-0-405-08566-6
- "Studies since 1920 of French Thought in the Period of the Enlightenment," The Journal of Modern History Vol. 4, No. 2, June 1932
- Lady-in-Waiting: The Romance of Lafayette and Aglaé de Hunolstein, Johns Hopkins Press, 1939
- Lafayette Comes to America University of Chicago Press, 1935; Kessinger Publishing, 2008ISBN 978-1-4366-9259-5
- Lafayette Joins the American Army, University of Chicago Press, 1937; 1965 & 1974ISBN 978-0-608-13370-6
- "Carl Becker: Skeptic or Humanist?" The Journal of Modern History Vol. 18, No. 2, June 1946
- "Our Vichy Fumble," The Journal of Modern History Vol. 20, No. 1, March 1948
- Lafayette and the Close of the American Revolution The University of Chicago Press, 1942; UMI books on demand, 1998 ISBN 978-0-608-13369-0
- Lafayette Between the American and the French Revolution, 1783–1789 University of Chicago Press, 1950 and 1965
- Lafayette In the French Revolution: Through the October Days, University of Chicago Press, 1969
- Lafayette in the French Revolution: From the October Days through the Federation, University of Chicago Press, 1973
- Lafayette in America, 1777–1783, University of Chicago Press, 1975; L'Esprit de Lafayette Society
- Social Science Research Council. Committee on Historical Analysis
- Lafayette: A Guide to the Letters, Documents, and Manuscripts in the... The Life of Jean Paul Marat (Little blue book No. 433) Kessinger Publishing, 2006ISBN 978-1-4286-0012-6
- The Foundations of the Modern World [1300–1775], Allen & Unwin, 1969
- Toward the French Revolution: Europe & America in the Eighteenth-Century... Charles Scribner's Sons, 1973ISBN 978-0-684-13699-8
- The use of personal documents in history, anthropology, and sociology Editors Louis Reichenthal Gottschalk, Clyde Kluckhohn, Robert Cooley Angell, Social Science Research Council, 1945
- Generalization in the Writing of History
- Understanding history; a primer of historical method

== Personal life ==
Gottschalk met poet Laura Riding, then known by her maiden name, Laura Reichenthal, while she was a student and graduate assistant at Cornell University. They married on November 2, 1920, and he took her last name as his middle name. They divorced five years later, in 1925. He later married Fruma Kasden, in 1930; they had two sons. Fruma Gottschalk later taught Russian at the University of Chicago, and died in 1995.
