= Felicity Nussbaum =

American academic

Felicity A. Nussbaum (born 1944) is Distinguished Research Professor of English at the University of California, Los Angeles. Her research interests include 18th-century literature and culture, critical theory, gender studies, and postcolonial and Anglophone studies. In the past, she taught at Syracuse University and Indiana University South Bend.

She earned B.A., magna cum laude from the Austin College and M.A. and Ph.D. from the Indiana University Bloomington.

== Books ==
- 2010: Rival Queens: Actresses, Performance, and the Eighteenth-Century British Theater
- 2008: (co-ed. with Saree Makdisi) The Arabian Nights in Historical Context: Between East and West
- 2003: The Limits of the Human: Fictions of Anomaly, Race and Gender in the Long Eighteenth Century
- 2003: (ed.) The Global Eighteenth Century
  The 21 essays of the book are "contributions to the new field of 'critical global studies' of the long eighteenth century".
- 2000: "Defects": Engendering the Modern Body
- 1995: Torrid Zones: Maternity, Sexuality and Empire in Eighteenth-Century English Narratives
- 1989: The Autobiographical Subject: Gender and Ideology in Eighteenth-Century England
- 1987: (co-ed. with Laura Brown) The New Eighteenth Century: Theory/Politics/English Literature
- 1984: "The Brink of All We Hate": English Satires on Women, 1660–1750
- 1976: (ed.) Three Seventeenth-Century Satires

== Honors ==
Her academic honors include:

- 1991: Fellow of the John Simon Guggenheim Memorial Foundation
- 1989: Co-recipient of the Gottschalk Prize for the best book in its field for 1989
- Andrew Mellon Fellowship at the Huntington Library
- NEH Fellowship
