= David A. Bell =

American historian

- Born: David Avrom Bell; New York, NY
- Education: Harvard University; Princeton University
- Known for: Early Modern French history
- Awards: Los Angeles Times History Book Prize (2008); Leo Gershoy Prize, American Historical Association (2003)
- Scientific career
- Fields: History
- Workplaces: Princeton University; Johns Hopkins University; Yale University

David Avrom Bell is an American historian specializing in French history. In 2025, he was elected to the American Philosophical Society.

== Biography ==
Bell was born into a Jewish family in New York City in 1961. He is the son of sociologist Daniel Bell and literary critic Pearl Kazin Bell (Alfred Kazin's sister).

He completed his A.B. in History and Literature at Harvard University in 1983, magna cum laude and Phi Beta Kappa. He completed his M.A. in history in 1987 and his Ph.D. in 1991, both at Princeton University. He then taught at Yale University from 1990 to 1996; Johns Hopkins University from 1996 to 2010, where he was Dean of Faculty beginning in 2007; and at Princeton University since 2010.

== Contributions to Scholarship ==
=== Books ===
- Men on Horseback: The Power of Charisma in the Age of Revolution (Farrar, Straus and Giroux, 2020)
- The West: A New History (W. W. Norton, 2018)
- Napoleon: A Very Short Introduction (Oxford University Press, 2018)
- Shadows of Revolution: Reflections on France, Past and Present (Oxford University Press, 2016).
- Napoleon: A Concise Biography (Oxford University Press, 2015).
- The First Total War: Napoleon's Europe and the Birth of War As We Know It (Houghton Mifflin; Bloomsbury, 2007).
- The Cult of the Nation in France: Inventing Nationalism, 1680–1800 (Harvard University Press, 2001. Paperback 2003, ISBN 978-0674012370).
- Lawyers and Citizens: The Making of a Political Elite in Old Regime France (Oxford University Press, 1994).

== Awards ==
- Louis Gottschalk Prize, American Society for Eighteenth-Century Studies (2008) for his book The First Total War: Napoleon's Europe and the Birth of War As We Know It
- Finalist, Los Angeles Times History Book Prize (2008) for his book The First Total War: Napoleon's Europe and the Birth of War As We Know It
- John Simon Guggenheim Memorial Foundation Fellowship (2004)
- Leo Gershoy Award of the American Historical Association for his book The Cult of the Nation in France: Inventing Nationalism, 1680–1800 (2002)
- Woodrow Wilson International Center for Scholars (1998)
