= Hans Turley =

American literary scholar

Hans Turley (died June 2008) was a literary scholar, known for advancing the role of queer studies within eighteenth-century English literature, especially queer readings of pirate fiction.

Turley received his PhD in 1994 from the University of Washington. He taught briefly at Texas Tech University after graduation, then joined the faculty at the University of Connecticut in 1998.

Turley is best known for his 1999 monograph Rum, Sodomy, and the Lash: Piracy, Sexuality, and Masculine Identity, which Kathryn R. King describes as "one of the earliest works of eighteenth-century scholarship to introduce queer perspectives into the post-structuralist mix." The book studies homoerotic desire in eighteenth-century works, including Daniel Defoe's novels Robinson Crusoe and Captain Singleton, "opening the hatches" to an interpretation of pirate fiction that does not simply reinforce heteronormativity. The book was also notable for making unusually extensive work of primary sources not usually considered by literary scholars, and for highlighting the semi-fictionalized nature of the sensational pirate "histories" that influenced previous historical work on piracy.

Turley was a founding member of the American Society for Eighteenth-Century Studies' Queer Caucus in 1993. From 1997 to 2005, he served as an editor of the journal The Eighteenth Century: Theory and Interpretation, including overseeing a special double issue in 2003 titled "Preposterous Pleasure: Homoeroticism and the Eighteenth Century."

Turley died in June 2008. In 2012, a special issue of the journal The Eighteenth Century was published in his memory.
