= Barbara Maria Stafford =

American art historian (born 1941)

Barbara Maria Stafford (born 1941) is an art historian whose research focuses on the developments in imaging arts, optical sciences, and performance technologies since the Enlightenment.

== Early life and education ==
Stafford is of European parentage and was born in Vienna, Austria. Her family immigrated to the United States when she was seven, first living in Fort Monroe, Virginia. However, her American stepfather's job as a military attaché caused the family to move every few years to postings in cities including Leghorn, Rome, Italy; Yokohama, Japan; Kilene, Texas; and Ft. Knox, Kentucky.

Stafford received her BA from Northwestern University, where she majored in continental philosophy and comparative literature. She spent a year at the Sorbonne in Paris, studying with Jean Wahl, Philippe Souriau, and Charles Dédéyan. She returned to Northwestern to study art history and got her MA. She went on to the University of Chicago for doctoral studies, and during this period she won a fellowship from the American Association of University Women that enabled her to study at the Warburg Institute in London. There she met art historian Ernst Gombrich, who became her thesis adviser.

== Career ==
Stafford began her teaching career as an assistant professor at the National College of Education in 1969. In 1972, she moved on to Loyola University Chicago and, a year later, to the University of Delaware, where she remained for nearly a decade. From 1981 to 2010, she was a full professor at the University of Chicago, where she was the William B. Ogden Distinguished Service Professor until 2010. She is now emerita at the University of Chicago and has been teaching at the Georgia Institute of Technology since 2010 as a Distinguished University Visiting professor.

Stafford's books closely examine modes and technologies of visual presentation from the early modern period up to today's digital media. She works at the intersection of the imaging arts, the optical sciences, and performance technologies, with a strong interest in how experience is embodied. Her recent essays examine the revolutionary ways in which the brain sciences are changing our view of the total sensorium and inflecting our fundamental assumptions concerning perception, sensation, emotion, mental imagery, and subjectivity. Stafford's views have found an application in criticism of early mass media and multiple viewpoints, what she describes as "cross-referencing material bits of distant reality".

Stafford co-curated an influential exhibition at the J. Paul Getty Museum in 2001–02, "Devices of Wonder: From the World in a Box to Images on a Screen." The exhibition catalog of the same title won the Katharine Kyes Leab & Daniel J. Leab American Book Prizes Current Exhibition Award in 2003.

Stafford holds honorary degrees from the Maryland Institute College of Art (1996), Grand Valley State University, Michigan (1996), and the University of Warwick, England (1998). In addition to National Endowment for the Humanities and Guggenheim fellowships, she has won a number of prestigious awards for her research and books, including the American Society for Eighteenth-Century Studies Clifford Prize (1980), the College Art Association's Millard Meiss Publication Award (1979), the Gottschalk Prize for the best book on an eighteenth-century topic published during the preceding year, for Body Criticism (1992), the Michelle Kendrick Memorial Book Prize of the Society for Literature, Science, and the Arts for Echo Objects: the Cognitive Work of Images (2007), and the Thomas N. Bonner Award recognizing Echo Objects as "the best recent book in English on the theory and practice of the liberal arts."

== Selected publications ==
- A Field Guide to a New Metafield: Bridging the Humanities-Neurosciences Divide. University of Chicago Press, 2011.
- Echo Objects: The Cognitive Work of Images. University of Chicago Press, May 2007.
- Devices of Wonder: From the World in a Box to Images on a Screen. With Frances Terpak (coauthor). Getty Research Institute, 2002.
- Beyond Productivity: Information Technology, Innovation, and Creativity, (contributor as member of the Committee on Information Technology and Creativity), eds. William J. Mitchell, Alan S. Inouye, and Marjory S. Blumenthal. Washington D.C.: National Academy Press, 2003.
- Visual Analogy: Consciousness as the Art of Connecting. Cambridge, MA: The MIT Press, 1999.
- Good Looking. Essays on the Virtue of Images. Cambridge, MA: The MIT Press, 1996.
- Artful Science. Enlightenment, Entertainment and the Eclipse of Visual Education. Cambridge, MA: MIT Press, 1994.
- Body Criticism: Imaging the Unseen in Enlightenment Art and Medicine. Cambridge, MA, and London: MIT Press, 1991.
- Voyage into Substance: Art, Science, Nature and the Illustrated Travel Account, 1760-1840. Cambridge, Mass: MIT Press, 1984.
