= Daniel K. Richter =

American historian (1954-)

- Born: Daniel Karl Richter; October 15, 1954 (age 72); Erie, Pennsylvania
- Education: Columbia University
- Occupation: Historian
- Notable work: Facing East From Indian Country, Before the Revolution: America's Ancient Pasts

Daniel Karl Richter (born October 15, 1954) is an American historian specializing in early American history, especially colonial North America and Native American history before 1800. He is the Roy F. and Jeannette P. Nichols Professor of American History at the University of Pennsylvania and the Richard S. Dunn Director of the McNeil Center for Early American Studies. His book Facing East from Indian Country was a finalist for the Pulitzer Prize in 2002.

== Life and career ==
Daniel Karl Richter was born on October 15, 1954, in Erie, Pennsylvania. He earned his Ph.D. from Columbia University in 1984. Before coming to the University of Pennsylvania, Richter taught at the College of William & Mary and Dickinson College.

== Awards ==
- 1993 Ray Allen Billington Award, Organization of American Historians, for The Ordeal of the Longhouse
- 1993 Frederick Jackson Turner Award, Organization of American Historians, for The Ordeal of the Longhouse
- 1994 Choice Outstanding Academic Book, for The Ordeal of the Longhouse
- 2001–02 Louis Gottschalk Prize in Eighteenth-Century History, for Facing East from Indian Country
- 2002 Pulitzer Prize finalist for Facing East from Indian Country

== Works ==
- The Lords Proprietors: Feudal Dreams in English America, 1660-1689, under contract with Harvard University Press.
- Trade, Land, Power: The Struggle for Eastern North America. University of Pennsylvania Press. 2013. ISBN 9780812245004. Archived from the original on June 6, 2013.
- Before the Revolution: America’s Ancient Pasts (Harvard University Press, 2011; paperback 2013). ISBN 9780674072367.
- Facing East from Indian Country: A Native History of Early America (Harvard University Press, 2001; paperback 2003). ISBN 9780674011175.
- The Ordeal of the Longhouse: The Peoples of the Iroquois League in the Era of European Colonization (University of North Carolina Press, 1992). ISBN 9780807843949.
- Friends and Enemies in Penn’s Woods: Colonists, Indians, and the Racial Construction of Pennsylvania, co-editor with William Pencak (Pennsylvania State University Press, 2004). ISBN 978-0-271-02385-4.
- Beyond the Covenant Chain: The Iroquois and Their Neighbors in Indian North America, 1600-1800, co-editor with James H. Merrell (Pennsylvania State University Press, 2003). ISBN 978-0271022994.
