= Facing East from Indian Country =

2001 Native American history book

Facing East from Indian Country: A Native History of Early America
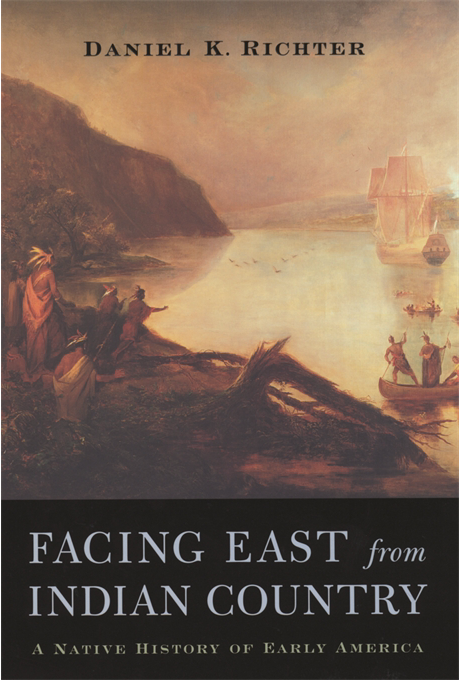
- Author: Daniel K. Richter
- Language: English
- Subject: Native American Studies, United States Colonial History
- Published: 2001
- Publisher: Harvard University Press
- Publication place: United States
- Media type: Print
- Pages: 336 pages
- Awards: Finalist, 2002 Pulitzer Prize for History, 2001–2002 Louis Gottschalk Prize
- ISBN: 0804728429

Facing East from Indian Country: A Native History of Early America is a work of Native American history by historian Daniel K. Richter that investigates the settlement of North America by Europeans from the perspective of American Indians. The book was a Pulitzer Prize finalist in 2002.

== Synopsis ==
Facing East begins by exploring, through available facts, possibilities of American Indian scenarios that have not been part of European-centered imaginations about American Indians. Richter goes on to show the active participation of American Indians in relations with European settlers, particularly their responses to "abstract material responses" brought about by European colonization. The figures Pocahontas, Tekakwitha, and Metacom are brought together in an analysis that shows their similar but varying deliberate involvements with Europeans. Richter relies on spiritual autobiographies and conversion narratives on American Natives by European colonists to elucidate an Indian point of view. Richter argues that American Indian participation in the Atlantic economy and warfare was essential and that Europeans and American Indians depended on each other. According to Richter, with the increasing animosity between American Indians and colonists, both groups developed their mindsets about each other.

== Reception ==
Facing East received generally positive reviews and was praised for its writing style and argumentation. Gail D. MacLeitch in the Journal of World History, notes the importance of the work in addressing a lack of research on Native American history from their perspective and praises the book's subtle, adept and imaginative writing style. In the Journal of Social History, Nancy Shoemaker writes, "Facing East from Indian Country will appeal to non-specialists, a general public, and students as well as to scholars in the field. It is precisely the kind of book that could succeed at realizing Richter’s longstanding crusade to earn for American Indian history a vital place in the larger narrative of American history."
