= American Society for Eighteenth-Century Studies =

American interdisciplinary scholarly group

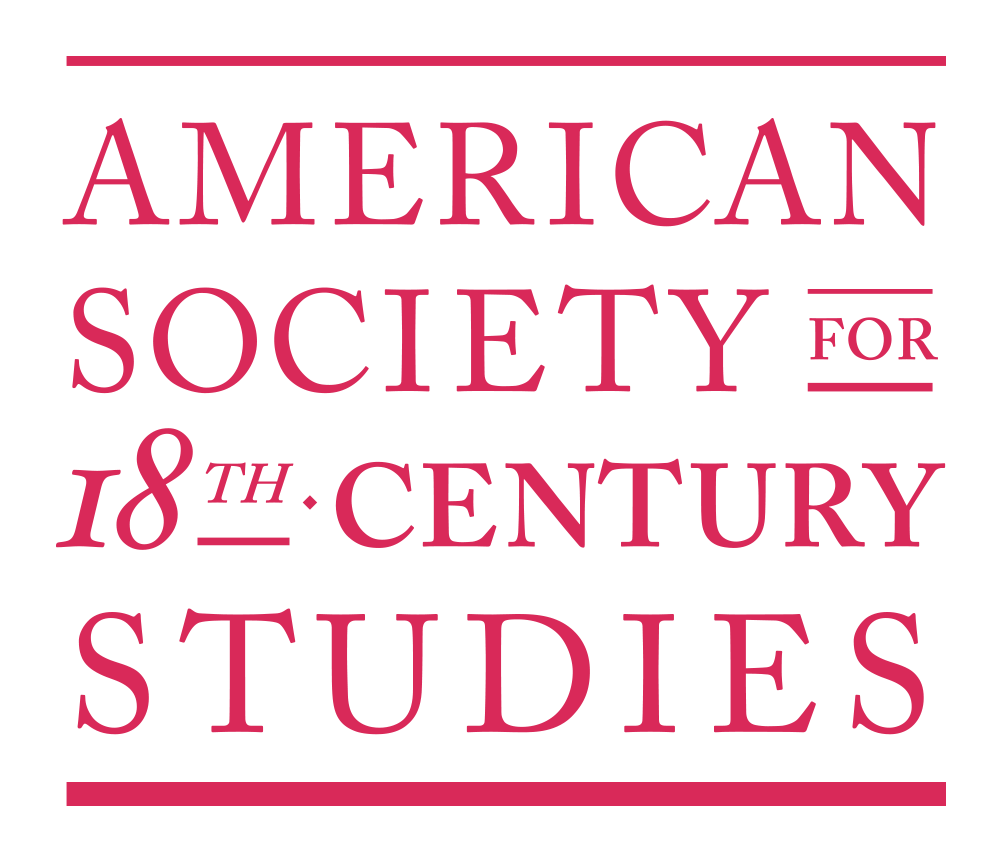
- Abbreviation: ASECS
- Type: Academic society
- Purpose: Humanities research
- Affiliations: American Historical Association; Modern Language Association; American Council of Learned Societies
- Website: asecs.org

The American Society for Eighteenth-Century Studies (ASECS) is an academic society for humanities research related to the "long" eighteenth century, from the later seventeenth through the early nineteenth centuries. ASECS was established in 1969, and has been an affiliate of the American Historical Association (AHA) since 2000. ASECS is an interdisciplinary society in the sense that its members come from a wide range of humanities disciplines, including history, literature, philosophy, art history, and musicology. The society organizes an annual conference and sponsors two publications: the quarterly journal Eighteenth-Century Studies and the annual volume Studies in Eighteenth-Century Culture. It awards the Louis Gottschalk Prize and the James L. Clifford Article Prize.
