= Pangolin: Kulu's Journey =

2025 Netflix original documentary film

- Promotional poster
- Directed by: Pippa Ehrlich
- Production companies: Anonymous Content; Dog Star Films; Water Creature
- Distributed by: Netflix
- Release date: 21 April 2025
- Running time: 90 minutes
- Country: United Kingdom
- Language: English

Pangolin: Kulu’s Journey is a 2025 Netflix original documentary film directed by Pippa Ehrlich that follows South African conservationist Gareth Thomas as he rescues and rehabilitates a trafficked baby pangolin named Kulu. The film explores their unique bond while raising awareness about pangolin trafficking and global conservation efforts.

== Synopsis ==
The film tells the true story of a baby ground pangolin rescued from the illegal wildlife trade and the man determined to return her to the wild. Directed by Academy Award winning director Pippa Ehrlich (My Octopus Teacher), the documentary follows Gareth Thomas, a South African investment manager with no formal background in wildlife rehabilitation, as he unexpectedly becomes the caretaker of Kulu, a critically endangered pangolin pup found after being trafficked in Johannesburg. As Gareth navigates the complexities of nurturing a wild animal, the film highlights his growing connection with Kulu.

The documentary focuses on Kulu’s personal journey, along with the larger narrative of pangolins’ vulnerability to poaching and trafficking as the species is the most illegally traded mammal in the world. It sheds light on the emotional toll of conservation work, the human capacity for compassion and ultimately becomes a call to action, urging global audiences to reconsider their relationship with nature and to protect the world’s most threatened species.
