= Great white shark size =

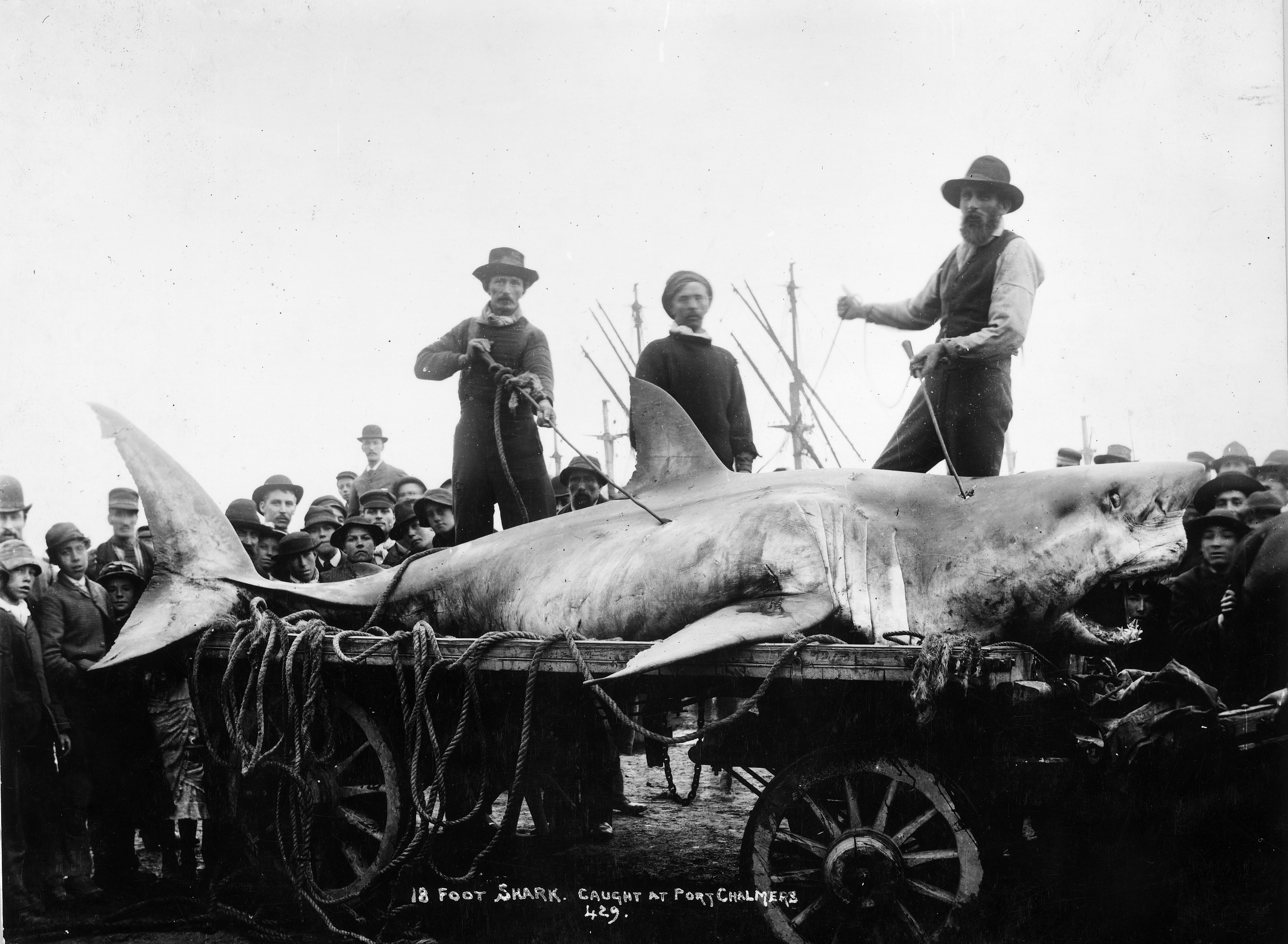
An estimated 18 ft (5.5 m) great white shark caught off Port Chalmers, New Zealand, circa 1900

The maximum size of the great white shark has been debated. In the 19th and 20th centuries; claims of specimens up to 11.3 m (37 ft) were common but these are now discredited. No shark has been confirmed over 6.1 m (20 ft).

== Confirmed maximum sizes ==
A complete female great white shark specimen in the Museum of Zoology in Lausanne, and claimed by De Maddalena et al. (2003) as the largest preserved specimen, measured 5.83 m (19.1 ft) in total body length with the caudal fin in its depressed position, and is estimated to have weighed 2,000 kg (4,410 lb). According to J. E. Randall, the largest white shark reliably measured was a 5.94 m (19.5 ft) specimen reported from Ledge Point, Western Australia, in 1984, but it is unclear whether that length was measured with the caudal fin in its depressed or natural position. Another great white specimen of similar size was a female caught in August 1983 in the Gulf of St. Lawrence, off Prince Edward Island, by David McKendrick of Alberton, Prince Edward Island. This female great white was 6.1 m (20 ft) long, as verified by the Canadian Shark Research Center.

A report of a specimen reportedly measuring 6.4 m (21 ft) in length and with a body mass estimated at 3,175–3,324 kg (7,000–7,328 lb) caught in 1945 off the coast of Cuba was at the time considered reliable by some experts. However, later studies revealed this particular specimen to be around 4.9 m (16 ft) in length, i.e. a specimen within the typical maximum size range.

The largest great white recognized by the International Game Fish Association (IGFA) is one caught by Alf Dean in southern Australian waters in 1959, weighing 1,208 kg (2,663 lb).

== Unconfirmed and discredited records ==
A number of very large unconfirmed great white shark specimens have been recorded. For decades, many ichthyological works, as well as the Guinness Book of World Records, listed two great white sharks as the largest individuals: In the 1870s, a 10.9 m (36 ft) great white captured in southern Australian waters, near Port Fairy, and an 11.3 m (37 ft) shark trapped in a herring weir in New Brunswick, Canada, in the 1930s. However, these measurements were not obtained in a rigorous, scientifically valid manner, and researchers have questioned the reliability of these measurements for a long time, noting they were much larger than any other accurately reported sighting. Later studies proved these doubts to be well-founded. This New Brunswick shark may have been a misidentified basking shark, as the two have similar body shapes. The question of the Port Fairy shark was settled in the 1970s when J. E. Randall examined the shark's jaws and "found that the Port Fairy shark was of the order of 5 m (16 ft) in length and suggested that a mistake had been made in the original record, in 1870, of the shark's length".

While these measurements have not been confirmed, some great white sharks caught in modern times have been estimated to be more than 7 m (23 ft) long, but these claims have received some criticism. However, J. E. Randall believed that great white shark may have exceeded 6.1 m (20 ft) in length. A great white shark was captured near Kangaroo Island in Australia on 1 April 1987. This shark was estimated to be more than 6.9 m (23 ft) long by Peter Resiley, and has been designated as KANGA. Another great white shark was caught in Malta by Alfredo Cutajar on 16 April 1987. This shark was also estimated to be around 7.13 m (23.4 ft) long by John Abela and has been designated as MALTA. However, Cappo drew criticism because he used shark size estimation methods proposed by J. E. Randall to suggest that the KANGA specimen was 5.8–6.4 m (19–21 ft) long. In a similar fashion, I. K. Fergusson also used shark size estimation methods proposed by J. E. Randall to suggest that the MALTA specimen was 5.3–5.7 m (17–19 ft) long. However, photographic evidence suggested that these specimens were larger than the size estimations yielded through Randall's methods. Thus, a team of scientists—H. F. Mollet, G. M. Cailliet, A. P. Klimley, D. A. Ebert, A. D. Testi, and L. J. V. Compagno—reviewed the cases of the KANGA and MALTA specimens in 1996 to resolve the dispute by conducting a comprehensive morphometric analysis of the remains of these sharks and re-examination of photographic evidence in an attempt to validate the original size estimations and their findings were consistent with them. The findings indicated that estimations by P. Resiley and J. Abela are reasonable and could not be ruled out.

A particularly large female great white nicknamed "Deep Blue", estimated measuring at 6.1 m (20 ft) was filmed off Guadalupe during shooting for the 2014 episode of Shark Week "Jaws Strikes Back". Deep Blue would also later gain significant attention when she was filmed interacting with researcher Mauricio Hoyas Pallida in a viral video that Mauricio posted on Facebook on 11 June 2015. Deep Blue was later seen off Oahu in January 2019 while scavenging a sperm whale carcass, whereupon she was filmed swimming beside divers including dive tourism operator and model Ocean Ramsey in open water. A particularly infamous great white shark, supposedly of record proportions, once patrolled the area that comprises False Bay, South Africa, was said to be well over 7 m (23 ft) during the early 1980s. This shark, known locally as the "Submarine", had a legendary reputation that was supposedly well-founded. Though rumours have stated this shark was exaggerated in size or non-existent altogether, witness accounts by the then young Craig Anthony Ferreira, a notable shark expert in South Africa, and his father indicate an unusually large animal of considerable size and power (though it remains uncertain just how massive the shark was as it escaped capture each time it was hooked). Ferreira describes the four encounters with the giant shark he participated in with great detail in his book Great White Sharks On Their Best Behavior.

== List of reported sizes ==
| Date | Location | Reported length | Reported weight | DUJP | Reported tooth size | Scientifically analysed length | Comments |
|---|---|---|---|---|---|---|---|
| 22 May 1989 | Ledge Point, Western Australia | 594.4 cm | 2,052.27 kg | 1,300 mm | 51 mm | 594.4 cm | Largest confirmed specimen per John. E. Randall |
| November 2001 | East Sea, China | 602.0 cm | 2,460.00 kg | Not listed | Not listed | 602.0 cm | Verified by marine biologist Heather M Christianson |
| 17 April 1952 | Streaky Bay, Australia | 609.6 cm | 1,360.77 kg | Not available | Not available | Not available | Enormous white shark periodically hooked by several fisherman; hooked by Alf Dean but broke the line. Estimated to be easily 20 feet in length. |
| 4 August 1983 | Prince Edward Island, Canada | 609.6 cm | 2,213.78 kg | 1,430 mm | 47.5 mm | 609.6 cm | Verified by marine biologist Gordon Hubbell |
| 13 October 1956 | Maguelone, France | 589.0 cm | Not listed | Not listed | Not listed | Not listed | Girth estimated at 400 cm |
| 16 June 1996 | Malindi, Kenya | 640.0 cm | 2,200.00 kg | Not listed | Not listed | 570.0 cm | Shark cut apart before it could be photographed and weighed in total |
| May 1945 | Cojimar, Cuba | 640.8 cm | 3,220.5 kg | Not listed | 44 mm | 633.13 cm | Estimated by John Randall to be 494.37 cm in length, revised upwards per analysis by Maddalena |
| 14 May 1997 | Hualien Country, Taiwan | 670.0 cm | 2,500 kg | Not listed | Not listed | Not listed | Only photo utilizes forced perspective, likely measurement was lower |
| 1 April 1987 | Kangaroo Island, South Australia | 700.0 cm | 2,500 kg | 1,250 mm | Not listed | 600 cm | Original length of 700 cm cannot be disregarded |
| 17 April 1987 | Filfla, Malta | 714.0 cm | 2,880 kg | 1,120 mm | 46.9 mm | 668 cm – 681 cm | Original reported length of 714 cm is possible |
| May 1978 | Azores | 900.0 cm | 4,546 kg | Not listed | 76.0 mm | 610 cm | Photos examined by John Randall |
| Undetermined | False Bay, South Africa | 1,310.64 cm | Not listed | Not listed | Not listed | Not listed | Referred to by Lawrence G. Green in book |
| 5 June 1975 | Long Island, NY | 914.14 cm | Not listed | 762.00 mm | Not listed | Not listed | Sited by charter captain Paul Sundberg. Harpooned but broke away, left a 30 in lower bite mark in the bottom of his boat |
| June 1978 | Montauk Point | 762.00 cm | 1,360.78 kg | Not listed | Not listed | Not listed | Harpooned by charter captain John Sweetman, towed boat 30 miles before breaking free. Also spotted by charter captain Paul Sundberg and confirmed visually as a great white. |
| March 2008 | Sandun, China | 1,000.00 cm | 2,267.96 kg | Not listed | Not listed | 614.5 | Weight considered far too low for shark of that length, would have been 9,772.37 kg if size was accurate |
| 17 January 2019 | Hawaii | 609.6 cm | 2,267.96 kg | Not listed | Not listed | 609.6 cm | Deep Blue was spotted off of Mexico in 2013, and again off of Hawaii in 2019 |
| June 1930 | Grand Mahan | 1,127.76 cm | 2,267.96 kg | Not listed | Not listed | 517.6 cm – 812.5 cm | John Randall estimated 517 cm based on a 28 mm tooth; scaling size based on quantity of reported liver oil yielded gives larger estimate |
| 6 November 1987 | Cowes, Phillip Island, Victoria, Australia | 633 cm | 2,306.52 kg | Not listed | 50.8 mm | 633 cm | Stomach contained an entire seal. Teeth were 2 inches long. |
