= Contender (shark) =

Largest known male great white shark in the Atlantic Ocean

Contender is the largest known male great white shark in the Atlantic Ocean. He was found in January 2025, weighs 1,653 pounds (750 kg), and is nearly 14 feet (4.3 m) long. The ocean conservation group OCEARCH tagged him so that he could be studied. In February 2026, it was noted that he was lingering in the Cape Fear area of North Carolina for unknown reasons.

== See also ==
- Deep Blue (great white shark)
- Haole Girl
