= Swati Thiyagarajan =

Indian conservationist, documentary filmmaker, and environmental journalist

- Occupations: Conservationist; documentary filmmaker; environmental journalist
- Spouse: Craig Foster

Swati Thiyagarajan is an Indian conservationist, documentary filmmaker and environmental journalist, based in Cape Town, South Africa and New Delhi, India. She is a core team member of the Sea Change Project in South Africa and environmental editor at the Indian television news network of NDTV. Thiyagarajan is a recipient of the Carl Zeiss Award, Earth Heroes Award and two Ramnath Goenka Excellence in Journalism Awards. Her work as the environmental editor at NDTV has been acclaimed internationally and she has been described as the doyenne of environmental journalism in India.

== Early life ==
Swati Thiyagarajan grew up in the city of Chennai, Tamil Nadu, and is the daughter of Kannan Thiyagarajan, a student of Sishya School, Chennai and Rishi Valley School, the latter of which was founded and mentored by the philosopher Jiddu Krishnamurti. In her testimony, she states that her father was influenced by Krishnamurti, which led him to become passionate about nature and wildlife. She also states that her father introduced her to his best friend Siddharth Butch who was an ornithologist and photographer. Butch mentored her and initiated her in nature while on a beach in Chennai when she was a child. She learned to identify species of birds at the park of Theosophical Society Adyar, visited the Madras Crocodile Bank Trust where she held a snake for the first time, and visited the Guindy National Park to witness a tiger in the wild. Thiyagarajan was also the granddaughter of the classical Carnatic musician M. S. Subbulakshmi.

== Career ==
In 1997, Thiyagarajan joined the television news network NDTV as a journalist. She states that she proposed the idea of a series on wildlife, environment, and conservation issues to the network in 2000; her idea was accepted and she was assigned an all-woman team consisting of a co-anchor, a cameraperson, and an editor. She was the script writer, director, and presenter of the show, which featured half-hour documentaries on wildlife and conservation issues in locations around India and Africa, airing at prime time on NDTV. The series, entitled Born Wild, was broadcast by the network for 15 years. Ostensibly, it is the only documentary series on conservation that ran for more than ten years on an Indian television news network.

In 2012, Thiyagarajan directed the documentary film The Animal Communicator, which investigated the claims of interspecies communication by the conservationist Anna Breytenbach while examining her works.

In 2017, Thiyagarajan authored the book Born Wild which was based on her experiences on the field as a reporter and filmmaker. The book, published by Bloomsbury Publishing, is divided into chapters about various species and features an interview with the natural historian David Attenborough.

Thiyagarajan was the production manager for the Netflix film My Octopus Teacher, which featured her husband as the human subject and his diving experiences with octopuses in the kelp forest of False Bay, off the western shore of South Africa. The film won the Academy Award for the Best Documentary Feature, the Wildscreen Award presented by the World Wide Fund for Nature and was the winning nomination at the Jackson Wild Festival for 2020.

Thiyagarajan has become a core team member of the Sea Change Project, a conservation effort founded by Craig Foster and Ross Frylinck.

== Personal life ==
Thiyagarajan married the South African wildlife documentary filmmaker Craig Foster, who has a son from a previous marriage.
