= Jago: A Life Underwater =

Jago: A Life Underwater is a documentary filmed in 2015, directed by James Reed. It chronicles the life history of Rohani, also known as a "man of the sea", an elderly Bajau Laut fisherman from the Sulu Archipelago, who has spent over 60 years mastering the art of free-diving to hunt fish underwater. The film showcases his diving skills and the traditional lifestyle of the Bajau people, combining underwater cinematography with a narrative about a vanishing way of life. It was released on September 21, 2015 on BBC Four, as well as Amazon Prime Video and Apple TV.

== Synopsis ==
The documentary follows Rohani, an 80-year-old Bajau Laut fisherman living in a remote part of the Sulu Archipelago, Indonesia. For over six decades, he has honed his free-diving skills, enabling him to dive up to 20 meters underwater on one breath to hunt fish with a spear gun, a practice central to the Bajau's nomadic, sea-based culture. The film captures Rohani's daily life, from diving in coral reefs to sharing stories of his youth, including learning to swim before walking and diving with his father at age five. Through interviews and archival footage, it explores his connection to the ocean and the challenges faced by the Bajau as modernization threatens their traditional lifestyle.

== Production ==
Directed by James Reed and James Morgan, Jago: A Life Underwater was produced by James Reed, Johnny Langenheim, and James McAleer for Underdog Films in collaboration with James Morgan Films. The film was shot in the Sulu Archipelago, capturing the underwater world of the Bajau Laut with cinematography by Laurie Kanyok and Luke Barney. Rohani contributed to the underwater footage. The production team worked closely with the Bajau community to authentically portray their culture and environment. The documentary was filmed over several years, combining Rohani's personal storytelling with visual sequences of his dives in coral reefs. It premiered on BBC Four on September 21, 2015.

== Reception and legacy ==
Jago: A Life Underwater was featured at the DC Environmental Film Festival, where its storytelling and ecological themes were recognized.

== Awards ==
Jago: A Life Underwater won four awards:

- Jackson Hole Wildlife Film Festival's Grand Teton Award 2016
- RTS West of England Award Sound 2017
- RTS West Television Award Cinematography 2017
- RTS West Television Award Documentary 2017
