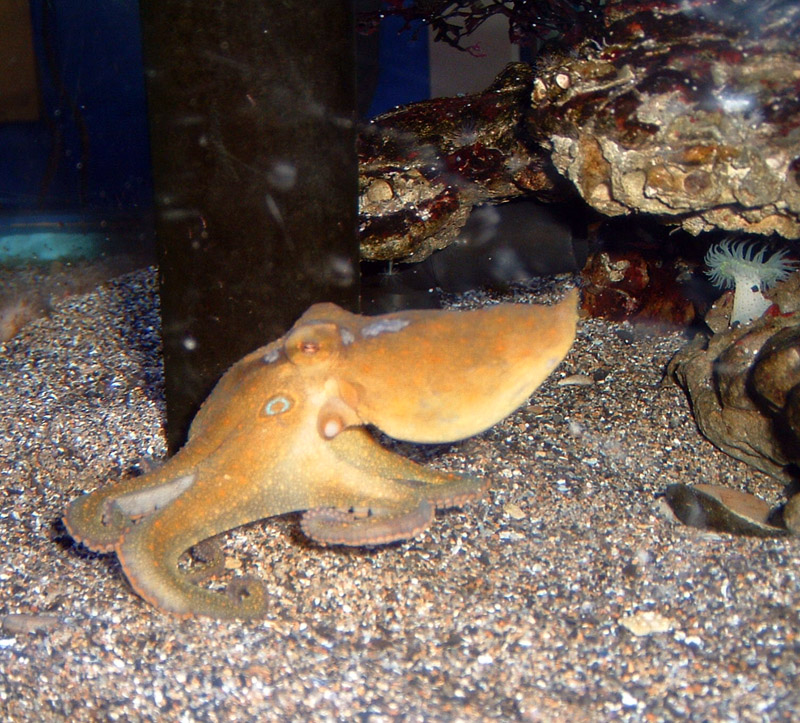
- At Heal the Bay Aquarium

Conservation status
- Least Concern (IUCN 3.1)

Scientific classification
- Kingdom: Animalia
- Phylum: Mollusca
- Class: Cephalopoda
- Order: Octopoda
- Family: Octopodidae
- Genus: Octopus
- Species: O. bimaculoides

Binomial name
- Octopus bimaculoides Pickford & McConnaughey, 1949

= California two-spot octopus =

Species of cephalopod

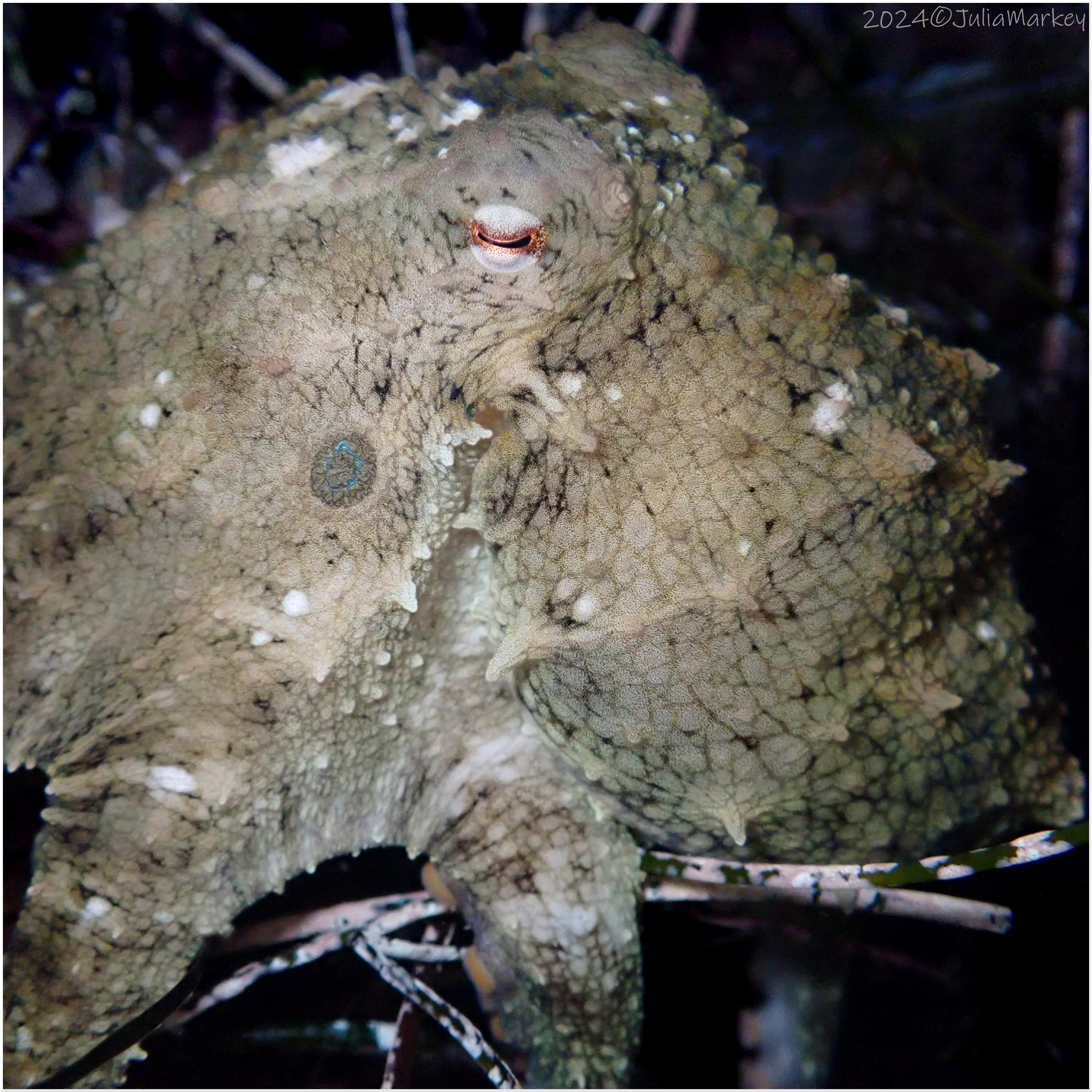
Octopus bimaculoides observed at Nicholson Point in La Jolla, California in August, 2024.

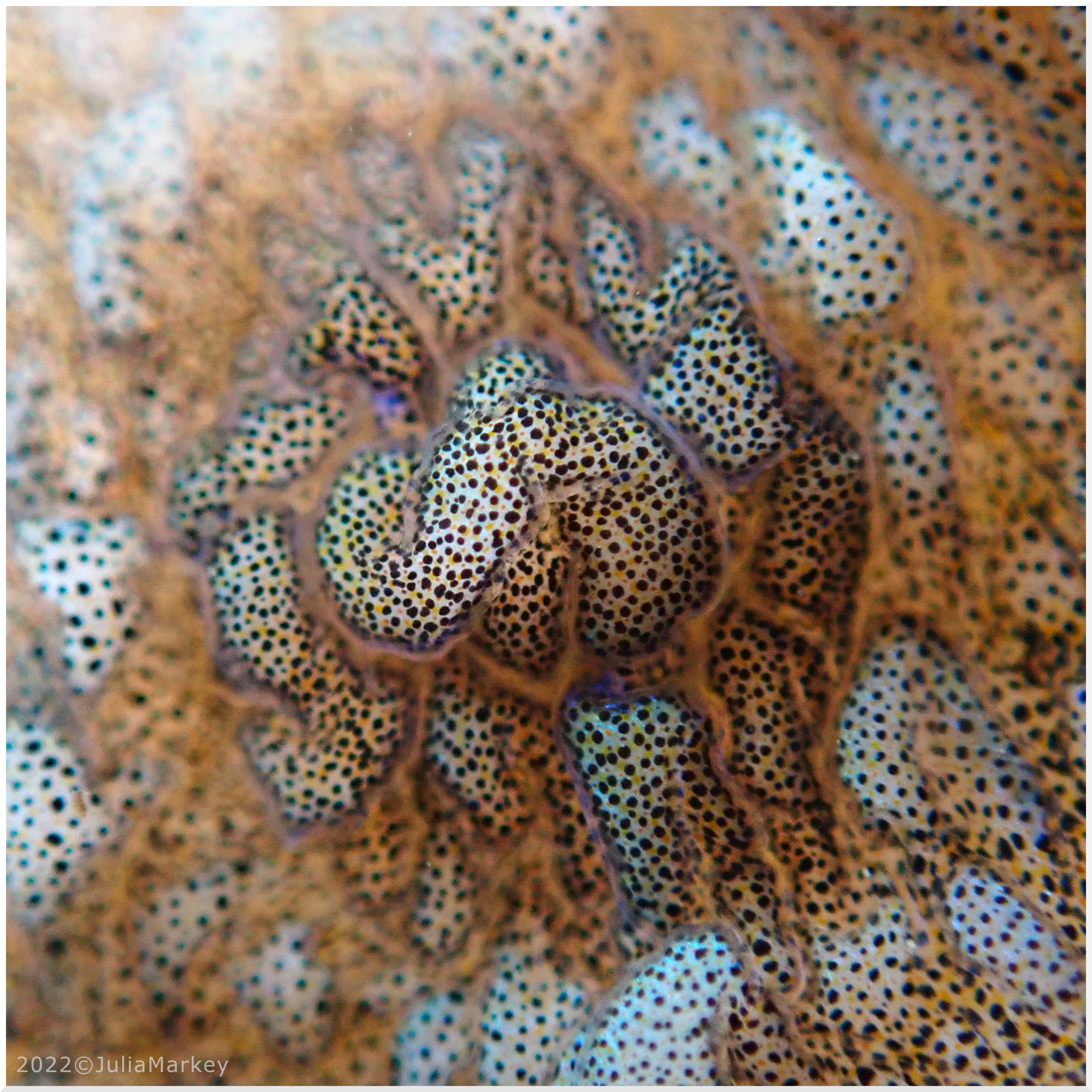
Close-up of the chromatophores on Octopus bimaculoides.

The California two-spot octopus (Octopus bimaculoides), often simply called a "bimac", is an octopus species native to many parts of the Pacific Ocean including the coast of California. One can identify the species by the circular blue eyespots on each side of its head. Bimacs usually live to be about two years old. They are closely related to Verrill's two-spot octopus (Octopus bimaculatus). In 2015, O. bimaculoides became the first octopus to have a fully sequenced genome.

== Description ==
Octopus bimaculoides reaches a mantle size of 17.5 cm (6.9 in) with arms to 58 cm (23 in). Not usually heavily textured, it has several common colors, such as grey with yellow splotches, and uses highly developed crypsis, which is camouflage or color-changing to match the environment.

Octopuses achieve color change in part by chromatophores, iridophores, and leucophores. All are structures of the skin in increasing depth. Chromatophores are elastic pigment sacs with muscle fibers attached by which they can expand and contract. The leucophores are important because they allow for the reflection of white light, and allow the skin to reflect wavelengths of light which are prevalent in their habitat, and produce disruptive patterns. The other aspect to cephalopod camouflage is the brain, which contains nerves coated in chromatophore fibers, controlling coloration patterning.

This octopus is named for the false eye spot (ocellus) under each real eye. These ocelli are an iridescent blue, chain-link circle, set in a circle of black.

On its arms, the octopus possesses many "suckers" that it uses to taste. They have three hearts, two gills, blue blood, and a donut-shaped brain.

== Distribution and habitat ==
O. bimaculoides are found in coastal waters, in the eastern Pacific along mid- and southern-California and the western side of the Baja California Peninsula in Mexico. They live at depths from the intertidal, down to at least 20 m (66 ft).

It prefers rocky reefs or debris for hiding, and tolerates a wide temperature range 15–26 °C (59–79 °F), though prefers 18–22 °C (64–72 °F).

== Ecology and behavior ==
=== Lifespan ===
These octopuses live around one to one and a half years in their natural habitat, but can live for up to two years in captivity. The end is signaled by egg-laying in the female and senescence in both males and females.

=== Diet ===
Since these octopuses do not live for long, they mature rapidly and can hunt for food to feed themselves right after hatching. Hatchlings feed on amphipods or mysid shrimp. As they grow, the list of what they eat grows with them. California two-spot octopuses eat anything they can find, like fish and crustaceans. They are nocturnal, and hunt at night. Their camouflage abilities give them an advantage while hunting.

== Reproduction ==
Towards the end of their lifespan, they are ready to reproduce. These octopuses are semelparous: they mate and reproduce only once in their lives. They can mate at any point of the year. It is most common during the summer when the water is warmer. Using its spermatophores, the male fertilizes the female. The male dies soon after the reproductive act.

After mating, the female creates a den, where she will lay 20 to 100 eggs. After laying her eggs, she must keep them alive and well. She blows cool water through her siphon so that the eggs receive oxygen. This will go on until the eggs hatch, which ranges from 150 to 210 days. During this process, the female does not eat, and her condition deteriorates, usually culminating in death.

== Genetics ==
In recent years new technology, such as genome sequencing, has provided new information on the large amounts of clustered protocadherins (PCDH) in O. bimaculoides. The octopus was found to have 168 PCDH genes, about 120 clustered and 50 non-clustered PCDH. Unlike what has been documented about mammalian clustered PCDH, octopus PCDH are clustered around the genome in an organized manner, creating a head-to-tail arrangement.

== Studies ==
Researchers collected and tagged the octopus species, O. bimaculatus, to conduct acoustic telemetry research. They measured the position of the octopuses in the environment over the course of two weeks, recording the daily movement of each octopus. The study showed that O. bimaculatus always moves from one den to another every few days, and likely to avoid predation, the octopuses varied their daytime movement patterns and the distances they travel. Octopus bimaculoides exhibits distinct temperamental traits, such as active engagement and aggression, from as early as three weeks old. Studies also show the species' cognitive flexibility, demonstrated through play-like behaviors and problem-solving abilities, highlighting its advanced intelligence and adaptability to fluctuating environments.

From stable isotope analysis to look at the variation in diets of octopuses living in marine protected areas, versus non-protected sites. The researchers discovered that the octopuses living in protected areas have more diverse diets.

== See also ==
- Terrance the octopus
