= Craig Foster (filmmaker) =

South African documentary filmmaker

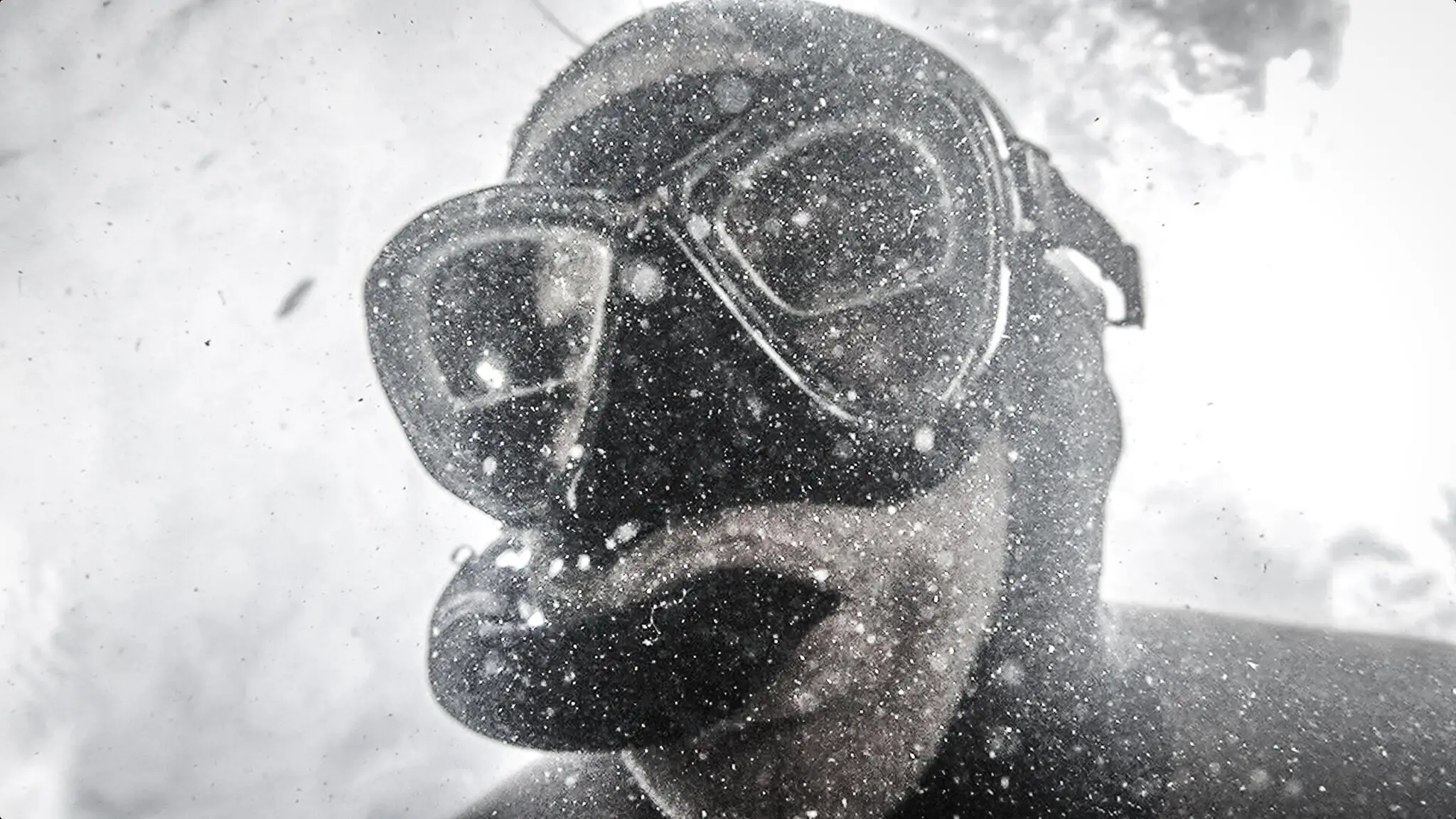
- Photo of Craig Foster from the perspective of an octopus in 2024
- Occupations: Documentary filmmaker; naturalist
- Known for: My Octopus Teacher
- Spouse: Swati Thiyagarajan
- Children: 1

Craig Foster is a South African documentary filmmaker, naturalist, and founder of the Sea Change Project. He is known for the 2020 film My Octopus Teacher, for which he won an Academy Award in 2021.

== Career ==
In 2012, Foster co-founded the Sea Change Project, a nonprofit group to protect marine life and raise awareness of the importance of the kelp forest in South Africa.

When making The Great Dance: A Hunter's Story (2000) and My Hunter's Heart (2010), he learned some of the animal tracking techniques from the San people of the Kalahari Desert.

=== My Octopus Teacher ===
Foster was the subject, producer, and photographer of a 2020 Netflix Original film called My Octopus Teacher, directed by Pippa Ehrlich and James Reed. The movie is about his experience diving in the kelp forests at a remote location in False Bay, near Cape Town, in the Western Cape of South Africa. During that time, he found a common octopus who began to trust him, and he revisited and filmed her every day for that year. Foster started filming in 2010 and the project was ten years in the making. It was the first Netflix Original South African nature documentary.

Underwater footage not shown in the movie but filmed by the same team, at the same location, and about the same subject, had been shown previously on Blue Planet II, episode 5.

== Recognition ==
During the course of his underwater tracking, Foster discovered eight new species of shrimp. One of them, Heteromysis fosteri, was named after him.

== Personal life ==
Foster is married to Indian documentary filmmaker and environmental journalist Swati Thiyagarajan. He has a son, Tom, by his former wife.

== Publications ==
In 2021, Foster co-authored the book Underwater Wild with Ross Frylinck.

In 2024, he published Amphibious Soul: Finding the Wild in a Tame World.

== Awards and nominations ==
Award	Date of ceremony	Category	Recipient(s)	Result	Ref.
Academy Awards	25 April 2021	Best Documentary Feature – My Octopus Teacher	Pippa Ehrlich, James Reed, and Craig Foster	Won	
British Academy Film Awards	11 April 2021	Best Documentary – My Octopus Teacher	Pippa Ehrlich, James Reed, and Craig Foster	Won	
Critics' Choice Documentary Awards	16 November 2020	Best Narration – My Octopus Teacher	Craig Foster	Nominated	
International Documentary Association Awards	16 January 2021	Pare Lorentz Award – My Octopus Teacher	Pippa Ehrlich, James Reed, and Craig Foster	Won	
Producers Guild of America Awards	24 March 2021	Outstanding Producer of Documentary Theatrical Motion Pictures – My Octopus Teacher	Craig Foster	Won	

== Selected filmography ==
Foster's film projects include:

- The Great Dance: A Hunter's Story (2000, director)
- Africa Unbottled (2001, director)
- Cosmic Africa (2003, director)
- My Hunter's Heart (2010, director)
- Into the Dragon's Lair (2010, cinematographer)
- Wild Walk (2010 television series, director)
- The Animal Communicator (2012, director, producer)
- Touching the Dragon (2013, director)
- Dragons Feast (2014 television documentary film, director)
- My Octopus Teacher (2020, producer, cinematographer, subject)
