= 32nd Producers Guild of America Awards =

32nd Annual Producers Guild Awards
- Date: March 24, 2021
- Location: Virtual
- Country: United States
- Presented by: Producers Guild of America

Highlights
- Best Producer(s) Motion Picture: Nomadland – Frances McDormand, Peter Spears, Mollye Asher, Dan Janvey, and Chloé Zhao
- Best Producer(s) Animated Feature: Soul – Dana Murray
- Best Producer(s) Documentary Motion Picture: My Octopus Teacher – Craig Foster

The 32nd Producers Guild of America Awards (also known as 2021 Producers Guild Awards or 2021 PGA Awards), honoring the best film and television producers of 2020, were held virtually on March 24, 2021. The nominations in the documentary category were announced on February 2, 2021, the nominees in the sports, children's and short-form categories were announced on February 26, 2021, and the remaining nominations for film and television were announced on March 8, 2021. The finalists for the PGA Innovation Award were announced on March 17, 2021.

== Winners and nominees ==
=== Film ===
Darryl F. Zanuck Award for Outstanding Producer of Theatrical Motion Pictures
- Nomadland – Frances McDormand, Peter Spears, Mollye Asher, Dan Janvey, and Chloé Zhao
  - Borat Subsequent Moviefilm – Sacha Baron Cohen, Monica Levinson, and Anthony Hines
  - Judas and the Black Messiah – Charles D. King, Ryan Coogler, and Shaka King
  - Ma Rainey’s Black Bottom – Denzel Washington and Todd Black
  - Mank – Ceán Chaffin, Eric Roth, and Douglas Urbanski
  - Minari – Christina Oh
  - One Night in Miami... – Jess Wu Calder, Keith Calder, and Jody Klein
  - Promising Young Woman – Josey McNamara, Ben Browning, Ashley Fox, and Emerald Fennell
  - Sound of Metal – Bert Hamelinck and Sacha Ben Harroche
  - The Trial of the Chicago 7 – Marc Platt and Stuart M. Besser
Outstanding Producer of Animated Theatrical Motion Pictures
- Soul – Dana Murray
  - The Croods: A New Age – Mark Swift
  - Onward – Kori Rae
  - Over the Moon – Gennie Rim and Peilin Chou
  - Wolfwalkers – Paul Young, Nora Twomey, Tomm Moore, and Stéphan Roelants
Outstanding Producer of Documentary Theatrical Motion Pictures
- My Octopus Teacher – Craig Foster
  - David Attenborough: A Life on Our Planet – Jonnie Hughes
  - Dick Johnson Is Dead – Kirsten Johnson, Katy Chevigny, and Marilyn Ness
  - Softie – Toni Kamau and Sam Soko
  - A Thousand Cuts – Ramona S. Diaz, Leah Marino, Julie Goldman, Christopher Clements, and Carolyn Hepburn
  - Time – Lauren Domino, Kellen Quinn, and Garrett Bradley
  - The Truffle Hunters – Michael Dweck and Gregory Kershaw

=== Television ===
Norman Felton Award for Outstanding Producer of Episodic Television, Drama
- The Crown (Netflix) – Peter Morgan, Suzanne Mackie, Stephen Daldry, Andy Harries, Benjamin Caron, Matthew Byam-Shaw, Robert Fox, Michael Casey, Andy Stebbing, Martin Harrison, and Oona O'Beirn
  - Better Call Saul (AMC) – Peter Gould, Vince Gilligan, Mark Johnson, Melissa Bernstein, Thomas Schnauz, Diane Mercer, Gordon Smith, Alison Tatlock, Ann Cherkis, Bob Odenkirk, and Princess Nash
  - Bridgerton (Netflix) – Chris Van Dusen, Shonda Rhimes, Betsy Beers, Scott Collins, Alison Eakle, Sara Fischer, Sarada McDermott, Holden Chang, and Tom Verica
  - The Mandalorian (Disney+) – Jon Favreau, Dave Filoni, Kathleen Kennedy, Colin Wilson, Karen Gilchrist, John Bartnicki, and Carrie Beck
  - Ozark (Netflix) – Jason Bateman, Chris Mundy, Bill Dubuque, Mark Williams, Patrick Markey, John Shiban, Miki Johnson, Matthew Spiegel, Erin Mitchell, Martin Zimmerman, and Peter Thorell
Danny Thomas Award for Outstanding Producer of Episodic Television, Comedy
- Schitt's Creek (Pop) – Eugene Levy, Dan Levy, Andrew Barnsley, Fred Levy, David West Read, Ben Feigin, Michael Short, Kurt Smeaton, and Kosta Orfanidis
  - Curb Your Enthusiasm (HBO) – Larry David, Jeff Garlin, Jeff Schaffer, Laura Streicher, and Mychelle Deschamps
  - The Flight Attendant (HBO Max) – Greg Berlanti, Kaley Cuoco, Steve Yockey, Meredith Lavender, Marcie Ulin, Sarah Schechter, Suzanne McCormack, Jess Meyer, Raymond Quinlan, Jennifer Lence, and Erika Kennair
  - Ted Lasso (Apple TV+) – Bill Lawrence, Jason Sudeikis, Jeff Ingold, Bill Wrubel, Liza Katzer, Jane Becker, Jamie Lee, Kip Kroeger, Brendan Hunt, Tina Pawlik, and Joe Kelly
  - What We Do in the Shadows (FX) – Jemaine Clement, Taika Waititi, Paul Simms, Scott Rudin, Garrett Basch, Eli Bush, Stefani Robinson, Sam Johnson, Marika Sawyer, and Derek S. Rappaport
David L. Wolper Award for Outstanding Producer of Limited Series Television
- The Queen's Gambit (Netflix) – William Horberg, Allan Scott, Scott Frank, Marcus Loges, and Mick Aniceto
  - I May Destroy You (HBO) – Michaela Coel, Phil Clarke, Roberto Troni, Simon Meyers, and Simon Maloney
  - Normal People (BBC Three/Hulu) – Lenny Abrahamson, Sally Rooney, Ed Guiney, Andrew Lowe, Emma Norton, Anna Ferguson, and Catherine Magee
  - The Undoing (HBO) – Susanne Bier, David E. Kelley, Per Saari, Nicole Kidman, Bruna Papandrea, Stephen Garrett, Celia D. Costas, and Deb Dyer
  - Unorthodox (Netflix) – Anna Winger, Henning Kamm, and Alexa Karolinski
Outstanding Producer of Streamed or Televised Motion Pictures
- Hamilton (Disney+) – Thomas Kail, Lin-Manuel Miranda, and Jeffrey Seller
  - Bad Education (HBO) – Fred Berger and Eddie Vaisman
  - Christmas on the Square (Netflix) – Dolly Parton and Sam Haskell
  - Jane Goodall: The Hope (National Geographic)
  - What the Constitution Means to Me (Amazon) – Heidi Schreck, Marielle Heller, Robin Schwartz, Kyle Laursen, and Peter Saraf
Outstanding Producer of Non-Fiction Television
- The Last Dance (Netflix) – Mike Tollin, Curtis Polk, Estee Portnoy, Andrew Thompson, Gregg Winik, John Dahl, Libby Geist, Connor Schell, Peter Guber, Jason Hehir, Nina Krstic, Matt Maxson, Jacob Rogal, Alyson Sadofsky, and Jon Weinbach
  - 60 Minutes (CBS) – Bill Owens
  - Laurel Canyon (Epix) – Craig Kallman, Mark Pinkus, Darryl Frank, Justin Falvey, Stacey Offman, Richard Perello, Jeff Pollack, Alex Gibney, Frank Marshall, Erin Edeiken, and Ryan Suffern
  - McMillions (HBO) – Mark Wahlberg, Stephen Levinson, Archie Gips, James Lee Hernandez, and Brian Lazarte
  - Tiger King (Netflix) – Chris Smith, Fisher Stevens, Eric Goode, and Rebecca Chaiklin
Outstanding Producer of Game & Competition Television
- RuPaul's Drag Race (VH1) – Fenton Bailey, Randy Barbato, Tom Campbell, Mandy Salangsang, RuPaul Charles, Steven Corfe, Michele Mills, Jacqueline Wilson, Thairin Smothers, Adam Bronstein, Lisa Steele, John Polly, Michelle Visage, Jen Passovoy, and Alicia GargaroMagana
  - The Amazing Race (CBS) – Jerry Bruckheimer, Bertram van Munster, Jonathan Littman, Elise Doganieri, Mark Vertullo, and Phil Keoghan
  - The Masked Singer (Fox) – Craig Plestis, Izzie Pick-Ibarra, Rosie Seitchik, Nick Cannon, James Breen, Deena Katz, Lindsay Tuggle, Chris Wagner, Patrizia DiMaria, Brian Updyke, Jeff Kmiotek, Lauren Taylor Harding, Nick Campagna, Erin Brady, Tiana Gandelman, Kristin Campbell-Taylor, Lindsay John, Dom Worden, Peter Hebri, Zoë Ritchken, Lexi Shoemaker, Mike Riccio, Emily Smith, Chelsea Candelaria, and Joseph Warwick
  - Nailed It! (Netflix) – Patrick J. Doody, Gaylen Gawlowski, Casey Kriley, Jo Sharon, Sandra Birdsong, Anika Guldstrand, Cat Sullivan, and Melissa Johnson
  - The Voice (NBC) – John de Mol Jr., Mark Burnett, Audrey Morrissey, Adam Sher, Amanda Zucker, Kyra Thompson, Teddy Valenti, Kyley Tucker, and Carson Daly
Outstanding Producer of Live Entertainment & Talk Television
- Last Week Tonight with John Oliver (HBO) – John Oliver, Tim Carvell, Liz Stanton, Jeremy Tchaban, Christopher Werner, Laura L. Griffin, Kate Mullaney, Matt Passet, Marian Wang, and Charles Wilson
  - Dave Chappelle: 8:46 (Netflix) – Dave Chappelle, Julia Reichert, Sina Sadighi, and Steven Bognar
  - The Daily Show with Trevor Noah (Comedy Central) – Trevor Noah, Jen Flanz, Jill Katz, Justin Melkmann, Max Browning, Eric Davies, Pamela DePace, Ramin Hedayati, David Kibuuka, David Paul Meyer, Zhubin Parang, Elise Terrell, Jocelyn Conn, Jeff Gussow, Shawna Shepherd, Beth Shorr, Dan Amira, David Blog, Adam Chodikoff, Jimmy Donn, Scott Hercman, Kira Klang Hopf, Allison MacDonald, Ryan Middleton, Matt Negrin, and Juliet Werner
  - The Late Show with Stephen Colbert (CBS) – Stephen Colbert, Chris Licht, Tom Purcell, Jon Stewart, Tanya Michnevich Bracco, Barry Julien, Opus Moreschi, Denise Rehrig, Aaron Cohen, Paul Dinello, Emily Gertler, Jay Katsir, Matt Lappin, Bjoern Stejskal, Sara Vilkomerson, Ballard C. Boyd, Michael Brumm, Gabe Gronli, Paige Kendig, Jake Plunkett, and Adam Wager
  - Saturday Night Live (NBC) – Lorne Michaels, Steve Higgins, Erik Kenward, Lindsay Shookus, Erin Doyle, Tom Broecker, Caroline Maroney, and Ken Aymong
Outstanding Sports Program
- Defying Gravity: The Untold Story of Women's Gymnastics (YouTube)
  - Hard Knocks: Los Angeles (HBO)
  - Real Sports with Bryant Gumbel (HBO)
  - Seeing America with Megan Rapinoe (HBO)
  - The Shop: Uninterrupted Featuring President Barack Obama (HBO)
Outstanding Children's Program
- The Power of We: A Sesame Street Special (HBO Max)
  - Animaniacs (Hulu)
  - Carmen Sandiego (Netflix)
  - Looney Tunes Cartoons (HBO Max)
  - Star Wars: The Clone Wars (Disney+)
Outstanding Short-Form Program
- Carpool Karaoke: The Series (Apple TV)
  - Better Call Saul Employee Training: Legal Ethics with Kim Wexler (AMC)
  - Between The Scenes – The Daily Show (Comedy Central)
  - Inside Pixar: Inspired (Disney+)
  - SNL Presents: Stories from the Show (NBC)

=== PGA Innovation Award ===
PGA Innovation Award
- BRCvr (Big Rock Creative)
  - Adventure Lab and Dr. Crumb’s School for Disobedient Pets (Adventure Lab)
  - Andrew Goes Outside (Some Evil Studios)
  - Artificial (Artificial)
  - Baba Yaga (Baobab Studios)
  - Create Together (YouTube Originals)
  - Fragments
  - Jettison (Jigsaw Ensemble)
  - Krampusnacht (Ferryman Collective)
  - Oceanides (Royal Caribbean Entertainment)
  - The Line (ARVORE)
  - The Under Presents (Tender Claws)
