= Anna Breytenbach =

South African interspecies communicator

- Born: 16 August 1968 (age 58)
- Education: University of Cape Town (Bachelor of Social Science, 1989)
- Occupation: Animal communicator

Anna Breytenbach (born 16 August 1968) is a South African animal communicator, animal activist, conservationist, and public speaker.

== Biography ==
=== Early life and career ===
Anna Breytenbach was born on 16 August 1968 in Cape Town, South Africa to Barbara Breytenbach (née Finn) and Johannes Cloete Breytenbach. After having successfully studied psychology, Marketing and Economics at the University of Cape Town she entered the corporate world. She had a career for 12 years in Human Resources and Information Technology, in both Australia and the USA. Since 2004 Anna Breytenbach has practised as a professional animal communicator. She currently lives in coastal South Africa and conducts safaris on animal communication in South Africa.

=== Interspecies communication ===
In her twenties she decided to pursue her passion for wildlife (big cats in particular) by becoming a cheetah handler at a conservation education project. On moving to America, she explored wolf and other predator conservation. She has also served on committees for wolf, snow leopard, cheetah and mountain lion conservation.

Observing and being in close contact with these animals she says she found that she became more empathic. During her tracking training with the Wilderness Awareness School just outside Seattle, Washington she says she began to experience a heightened state of awareness with regard to the animals she was tracking. Having been raised in Africa, she had little experience or knowledge about North American species and therefore found it difficult to analyze or interpret their footprints in any logical way based on visual cues. Her mentors suggested that instead she should "feel" the energy from the track - whereupon she says she started to get brief mental images or other 'sensings'. These "sudden knowings" would subsequently prove to be true. She then researched this phenomenon further and studied to advanced levels through the Assisi International Animal Institute in the US from 2001 to 2004.

Subsequently, she worked at CyberTracker International, the inventors of CyberTracker, a piece of free GPS data collection software used across the world for monitoring and managing wildlife. She travels widely lecturing on animal conservation issues and teaching animal communication.

=== Documentary film and public appearance ===
Anna Breytenbach was in 2012 the subject of a 52-minute documentary film produced by Swati Thiyagarajan, Craig Foster and Damon Foster entitled "The Animal Communicator". This documentary was nominated for Best Long Documentary and Best Director of the "Jade Kunlun" Awards of 2012 World Mountain Documentary Festival of Qinghai China.

A short clip from the documentary film depicting Breytenbach's interaction with a black leopard at the Jukani Predator Park in South Africa was published on YouTube and went viral with over 4.5 million views.

Anna Breytenbach gave a talk on interspecies communication at the Findhorn Foundation in 2013; and appeared in a segment on South African television programme Carte Blanche in March 2014.

She was also featured on Buddha At The Gas Pump, "a series of interviews with spiritual teachers and awakened gurus" in 2019.
