= Sharks in popular culture =

Representations of the shark are common in popular culture in the Western world, with a range of media generally portraying them of eating machines and threats. In some media, however, comedy is drawn from portrayals of sharks running counter to their popular image, with shark characters being portrayed as unexpectedly friendly or otherwise comical. The lists below give an approximate sample of the many forms of representation of the shark in popular culture.

== Cartoons ==
- Sharks are sometimes seen in Tom and Jerry
- Jabberjaw is a cartoon shark and the lead character in the eponymous cartoon series
- Kenny the Shark is an anthropomorphic tiger shark
- Sharky the sharkdog from Eek! The Cat
- Sharky & George
- Rin Matsuoka, Free!
- Kisame Hoshigaki, Naruto
- The DIC Entertainment series, Street Sharks, featured crime-fighting man-shark hybrids
- In a season two episode of Captain Planet, sharks are the main focus
- In a season one episode of ThunderCats, a cross between a shark and a black widow is featured
- Sharks appear in several episodes of the animated series Aquaman
- The shark appears in two episodes of Oggy and the Cockroaches
- TigerSharks
- Zig and Sharko

== Comics ==
- King Shark, a humanoid shark supervillain created by DC Comics
- Tiger Shark, an enemy of Namor the Sub-Mariner
- Warren White, an enemy of Batman
- Tiger Shark, an identity assumed by two separate DC Comics characters
- The Shark, an identity assumed by three different DC Comics characters
- Sharks are sometimes seen swimming in Aquaman comics
- Jeff The Land Shark, a Marvel Comics character.

== Film ==
- The Jaws franchise follows a series of man-eating shark attacks. The first film Jaws, directed by Steven Spielberg, stars Roy Scheider, Robert Shaw, and Richard Dreyfuss, three men who set out to kill a bloodthirsty great white shark. The film's sequel, Jaws 2 which in turn made enough profit for more sequels without Scheider, Jaws 3-D and Jaws 4: The Revenge.
- Various James Bond films depict sharks as man-eating predators, e.g. Thunderball, Live and Let Die, The Spy Who Loved Me, For Your Eyes Only and Licence to Kill, used as violent forms of execution for traitors or alleged traitors to Bond's enemies. In the Austin Powers film series, which parodies many elements of the Bond films, the villain Dr. Evil is quite displeased when he is unable to acquire sharks with laser beams attached to their heads. His wish is granted in the third film.
- A shark makes an appearance in "Batman: The Movie", attacking Batman as he ascends up a helicopter ladder, and explodes after being sprayed with Bat-shark repellent.
- Shark!, a 1969 action film.
- Anchor, Bruce, and Chum-- a hammerhead shark, great white shark and a mako shark are a trio of sharks from the 2003 Disney/Pixar animated film, Finding Nemo. The three are depicted as vegetarians, who are fighting their instinctive desires to eat innocent fish.
- A family of great white and hammerhead sharks feature in the 2004 DreamWorks Animation animated film, Shark Tale.
- Maccus from Pirates of the Caribbean: Dead Man's Chest and Pirates of the Caribbean: At World's End had his scarred head the appearance of that of a hammerhead shark and also had sharp, fang-like teeth much like those of a shark.
- A shark briefly appears in Madagascar 2: Escape to Africa.
- The Sharknado franchise depicts sharks getting sucked into tornadoes and raining down upon people.
- A whale shark called Destiny features in the 2016 Disney/Pixar animated film Finding Dory.
- Undead sharks appear in the 2017 Disney film, Pirates of the Caribbean: Dead Men Tell No Tales.
- The Meg, a 2018 action film.
- Under Paris, depicts a large Shortfin Mako Shark in the Seine.

== Internet ==
- Helicopter Shark, a composite photo of a shark leaping out of the ocean attacking military personnel climbing a Sikorsky UH-60 Black Hawk helicopter ladder.
- Hololive EN VTuber Gawr Gura, whose motif is based on a shark.
- Deep Blue, a female great white whom is believed to be one of the largest of her species. Deep Blue went viral due to her media exposure from shark week, Facebook and video footage of Ocean Ramsey swimming with her.
- Hurricane Shark or Street Shark, nicknames for claims of a shark swimming in a flooded urban area, usually after a hurricane. Most such claims have been hoaxes; however, a 2022 video of a shark or other large fish swimming in Hurricane Ian's floodwaters in Fort Myers, Florida, proved to be authentic.
- Blåhaj, the name of a plush shark sold by IKEA, popularized by the LGBTQ+ (primarily the transgender) community.

== Magazines and literature ==
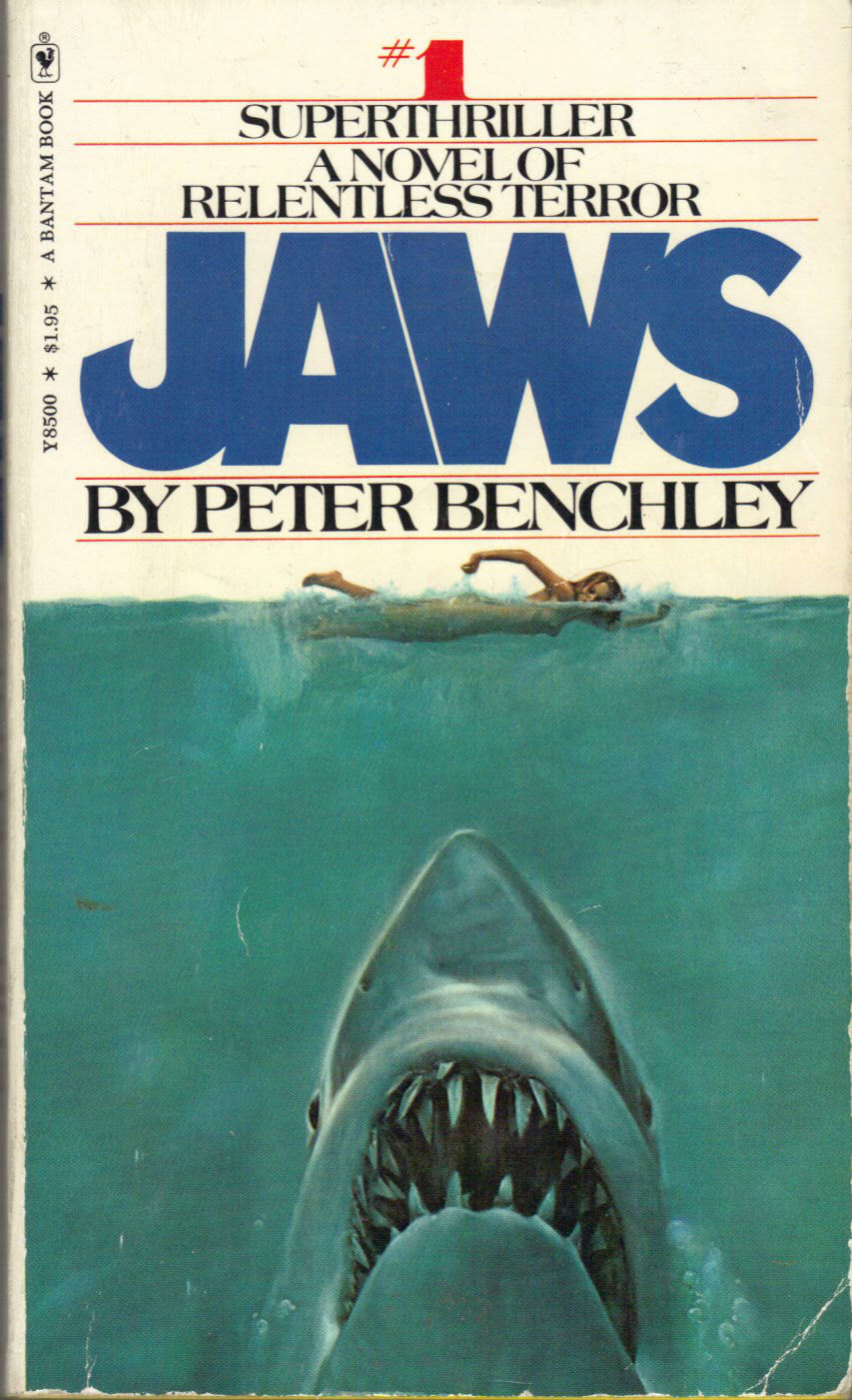
- Jaws by Peter Benchley (1975)
  Jaws, the book by Peter Benchley that the 1975 movie was based on. It tells a tale of a great white shark that terrorizes the small resort town of Amity Island, and three men who set out on a boat to track it down and kill it.
- Jaws 2 and Jaws: The Revenge, two film novelizations both written by Hank Searls
- A pregnant great white in another Peter Benchley novel, White Shark
- I Survived the Shark Attacks of 1916, a book by Lauren Tarshis
- The Devil's Teeth by Susan Casey
- Close to Shore by Michael Capuzzo about the Jersey Shore shark attacks of 1916
- Twelve Days of Terror by Richard Fernicola about the same events

== Music ==
- "Baby Shark", a children's song featuring a family of sharks. Popular as a campfire song, it has taken off since 2016, when Pinkfong, a South Korean education company, turned it into a viral video which spread through social media, online video, and radio.

== Role-playing games ==
- The Weresharks (parody of werewolves) from Dungeons & Dragons
- The Rokea weresharks of Werewolf: The Apocalypse

== As mascots ==
=== Schools, colleges and universities ===
- Razor the Shark of Nova Southeastern University
- The Perry Sharks are the school animal of the Oliver Hazard Perry School, South Boston, Massachusetts
- Tony the Landshark, an anthropomorphic shark currently used as the mascot for the Ole Miss Rebels (University of Mississippi)
- Finn, the mascot shark of the sports teams (VSA Sharks) at Victoria Shanghai Academy

== Sporting teams ==
- Colombian football team Atlético Junior de Barranquilla is nicknamed The Sharks, its mascot being an anthropomorphic great white shark called Willy.
- A shark is the mascot of UNLV men's basketball, though not of the athletic program as a whole. The use of a shark was established under the head coaching tenure of Jerry Tarkanian, nicknamed "Tark the Shark".
- Antibes Sharks, a French professional basketball team
- The Camden Riversharks, a baseball team based in New Jersey
- Named after the thresher shark, the Clearwater Threshers, are a minor league baseball from Florida
- The Cronulla Sharks, an Australian rugby league team
- The East Fremantle Sharks, an Australian rules football team
- Hawaii Pacific Sharks – NCAA Division II athletic program of Hawaii Pacific University
- Hull F.C. (once known as Hull Sharks), an English rugby league team who have now reverted to the name Hull F.C.
- The Jacksonville Sharks, the reigning champion of the Arena Football League
- Named after the hammerhead shark, the Jupiter Hammerheads are a minor league baseball team
- LIU Sharks – NCAA Division I athletic program of Long Island University
- The Orlando Sharks, a U.S. indoor soccer team
- The NSU Sharks, NCAA Division II athletic program of Nova Southeastern University
- The Sale Sharks, an English rugby union team
- The San Jose Sharks, a U.S. National Hockey League team
- The Shanghai Sharks, a Chinese basketball team
- Sharks F.C., a Nigerian football team
- The Sheffield Sharks, an English basketball team
- The Sharks, a South African rugby union team
- The Worcester Sharks, a professional ice hockey team

== Television ==
- Shark Week logo
  Shark Week
- Shark Tank, a reality show with a title card and name based on sharks
- Several myths about sharks have been tested in MythBusters
- "The Shark Fighter!", an episode of The Aquabats! Super Show! featuring a gang of mutant legged "land sharks" who attack a beachside city.
- Noel Fielding's Luxury Comedy, features a hammerhead shark called Todd Lagoona played by Richard Ayoade.
- Doubutsu Sentai Zyuohger, features a shark girl that called Sela
- In a 1977 episode of Happy Days, Fonzie famously jumps over a shark while water-skiing. This moment led to the creation of the phrase "jumping the shark," now used to describe the point when a TV show or franchise begins to decline in quality through absurd plot twists.

== Video games & pinball machines ==
Sharks variously appear in video games, arcade games and pinball machines. In video games, they typically appear either as playable characters or threats to the player. Sharks also make cameo appearances in some popular games and game series. The 1975 movie Jaws and its sequels inspired several licensed and unlicensed games.

=== Pinball machines ===
Sharks feature prominently in several pinball machines including:

- Sea Hunt, a 1972 machine inspired by the 1960s television program, manufactured by Leisure & Allied
- White Shark, a 1979 machine by Bell Coin Matic
- Shark, a 1980 machine by A. Hankin & Co.
- Shark, a 1982 machine by Taito
- Atlantis, a 1989 machine by Bally

=== Early video games ===
- Killer Shark by Sega is a 1972 electro-mechanical game where the player points and shoots a mock spear-gun at a projected shark that swims towards him. The game features on-screen in the movie Jaws.
- Shark Jaws is a single-player arcade game by Atari, Inc. that was intended to capitalise on the popularity of the film Jaws without being licensed to use the name
- Shark is a 1978 game for the Commodore PET in which the player controls a shark and must eat swimmers without being caught by a diver.
- Blue Shark is a 1978 arcade game by Midway in which the player shoots sea creatures, including a shark while a timer counts down.
- Terror at Selachii Bay is a one-player strategy game wherein the player provisions and skippers a boat hunting a shark using harpoons.
- Shark Attack is a 1981 arcade game in which the player controls a shark and must eat scuba divers.
- Jaws, a video game for the Nintendo Entertainment System.
- Shark! Shark! is a 1982 video game for the Intellivision, in which the player controls a fish and has to avoid being eaten by a shark.
- Scuba Dive is a 1983 video game published by Durell Software for the Oric-1 and ZX Spectrum. The player collects pearls from oysters on the seabed while avoiding the attention of sharks and other sea creatures.
- Shark Attack is a game by Apollo for the Atari 2600.
- Alive Sharks is a 1990 shareware game for DOS in which the player controls a scuba diver who must collect sea creatures from the ocean floor while avoiding shark bites and jellyfish stings. A sequel called VGA Sharks followed, and was updated between 1990 and 1994.
- In the 1998 arcade game The Ocean Hunter, one or two players must fight off sharks and other sea creatures while searching for seven sea monsters, including a megalodon.
- 3D Shark Hunting is a first-person perspective shark-hunting simulator released in 1999.

=== 21st century video games ===
- Shark! Hunting the Great White is a 2001 first-person shark hunting simulator.
- DreamWorks' Shark Tale game was released by Activision in 2004 for several consoles. The player is Oscar the fish, but sharks feature prominently in the game.
- Jaws Unleashed, is a 2006 game for the PlayStation 2, Xbox, and Microsoft Windows.
- Jaws: Ultimate Predator, is a game for the Wii and Nintendo 3DS set 35 years after the events of the original 1975 movie.
- The Hungry Shark series of mobile games allows the player to swim, leap and feed as a variety of real and imaginary shark species
- Derrick the Death Fin is a 2012 side-scrolling game in which the player controls a paper-craft shark.
- Depth is a sharks vs. humans underwater combat simulator where players can choose to be a human or one of several shark species.
- Maneater, a video game for the Xbox one featuring a bull shark as the playable animal. While its species is a bull shark, the game features various evolutions and mutations for the shark.

=== Minor appearances in video games ===
- Sharpedo is a Pokémon from Generation III of the game series that is the evolutionary successor to the Pokémon known as Carvanha.
- Sharks are a secondary threat to the player character in the 1984 Taito game, Sea Fighter Poseidon.
- Sharks are underwater enemies in a few entries of both the Mario and Donkey Kong franchises.
- Sharks are occasional enemies in the Ecco the Dolphin series.
- Finding Nemo, a video game for GameCube, PlayStation 2, Xbox, Game Boy Advance and Windows.
- Tiny is the name of a great white shark featured in Batman: Arkham City. Tiny was an attraction at Gotham Museum's "Terrors of the Deep" aquarium before the Penguin bought the building and turned it into his hideout.
- Whale sharks can be found in World of Warcraft: Cataclysm.
- Sharks can be seen underwater in Tomb Raider: Underworld.
- Sharks are seen as both enemies and hunting opportunities in Assassin's Creed IV: Black Flag.
- Sharks appear in Grand Theft Auto V.
- Tiger sharks can be seen underwater and attack in Call of Duty: Ghost.
- Various types of sharks can be caught in the oceans of the Animal Crossing series.
- In Kirby & the Amazing Mirror, the shark Gobbler appears as a boss in Olive Ocean.

== See also ==
- List of sharks
- Sharks in art
