= Haole Girl =

One of the largest great white sharks ever recorded

- Species: Carcharodon carcharias
- Sex: Female
- Known for: One of the largest great white sharks recorded
- Weight: Estimated >2,000 kg (4,400 lb)

Haole Girl is the nickname given to a female great white shark that is considered to be one of the largest great whites. The shark has been seen in Hawaii where it was spotted feeding on a whale carcass. The shark was initially thought to be Deep Blue, another large great white. However, researchers have claimed the shark spotted in Oahu, Hawaii was Haole Girl and was possibly pregnant.

== Discovery ==
Haole Girl was first spotted in Oahu, Hawaii January 13, 2019. The shark was spotted feeding on a sperm whale carcass.

== Description ==
Haole Girl is claimed to be one of the largest great white sharks, roughly the same size as Deep Blue, which was estimated to be around 20 ft. The similar size has caused confusion about which shark was actually filmed by Ocean Ramsey in Hawaii.

== Interactions with humans ==
The videos of Haole Girl seen in Hawaii show the shark to be calm and non-aggressive around the divers, allowing them to swim around her and even touch her.

== Identity ==
Haole Girl's size has seemingly led her to be mistaken for two large great white sharks known as Deep Blue and Kainani. The shark that has been seen swimming with scuba divers in Ramsey's videos is speculated to have actually been Haole Girl, instead of Deep Blue. In a twitter post, shark photographer George T. Probst claimed that many have assumed the shark was Deep Blue and mentions that Deep Blue was in the dive site two days prior. Michael Domeier has also disputed the claim that the shark was Deep Blue, as he stated that Haole Girl was newly discovered.

== See also ==
- Contender
