= Terrance (octopus) =

Octopus documented on TikTok

- Born: Late 2022 or early 2023; Californian coast, Pacific Ocean
- Died: April 22, 2024; Family aquarium, Edmond, Oklahoma
- Years active: 2023-2024
- Children: 50

TikTok information
- Page: Terrance the Octopus
- Followers: 400000
- Last updated: April 19, 2024

Terrance the Octopus was a pet California two-spot octopus (Octopus bimaculoides, nickname: bimac), who became popular following the unusual hatching of 50 baby octopuses in captivity. Cared for by the Clifford family, Terrance's life cycle is video-documented online through the social network TikTok.

== Life ==
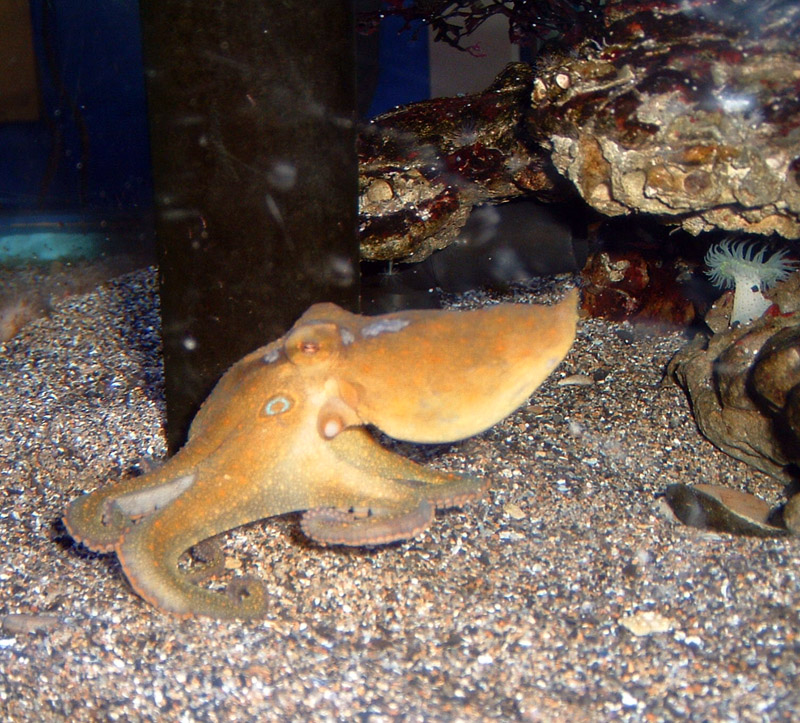
An octopus the same species as Terrance, but not her

Terrance was a California two-spot octopus (Octopus bimaculoides or "bimac"), a common pet octopus in the United States. Terrance's early life is not known, but her seller claimed to be a diver with a fishing license in California. Terrance was bought through Octopus News Magazine Online, and arrived on October 11, 2023 after a journey via UPS in a cardboard box, styrofoam insulation and plastic bag filled with air and seawater at the Clifford's Edmond, Oklahoma home, already considered a mature adult. With bimacs having an overall life expectancy of 12 to 18 months, the life expectancy of Terrance was short.

Two months after her arrival, and although originally thought to be male, in December 2023, Terrance laid about 50 eggs, a common behavior in the last life phase of female octopuses. It is believed Terrance mated before being caught and sold. Female octopodes generally will care for their eggs, even if eggs laid in captivity are usually unfertilized. Surprisingly, those eggs hatched in February 2024, with 50 hatchlings. Female octopodes may delay laying and development of fertilized eggs when stressed until a more favorable situation is secured.

To ensure their survival, the emergent hatchlings were separated and put into individual housings in order to avoid natural occurring cannibalization. Most hatchlings have been moved to an exotic pets room where they are fed live mysid shrimp daily and where a new 180-gallon tank is currently under preparation. After 4 months, all hatchlings had died.

== Death ==
Terrance died on April 22, 2024, in the aquarium at the Clifford family home.

== Caretakers ==
Terrance is mainly cared for by the Clifford family from Edmond, Oklahoma since 11 October 2023. The oldest child in the family has had a resilient passion for marine life and octopuses since 2 or 3 years old, hence the family's purchase. The octopus arrived for the child's 9th birthday and he named it Terrance. The Cliffords video-documented their earlier learning process, setting up stabilized aquariums ecosystems suitable for marine wild life, purchasing the octopus, caring for it and its hatchlings is online through the social network TikTok, receiving more than 3 million views.

Tim Tytle, a former radiologist with experience with exotic pets such as geckos, sea horses, venomous lizards and octopuses has also been pivotal in the family's efforts, and an intern has been hired to look for potential long term adopters.

Following the hatchings, the family researched related literatures, reached out to marine life experts and invested in tanks, water filters, water chillers, live crabs, snails and clams and in hopes of expanding the infrastructure to support the octopuses.

== Reception ==
The Terrance hatchlings were covered by national news organizations such as The New York Times, AP, The Washington Post, NPR and others. The reception to Terrance and its hatchlings' captivity have been diverse. Commenters have been both enthusiastic and critical.

Paul Clarkson, director of husbandry operations at the Monterey Bay Aquarium in Monterey, California, has praised the Cliffords for their dedication and care. He praised the family's efforts in raising awareness about sea life and octopuses. Both Clarkson and Jordan Baker at New England Aquarium in Boston cautioned pet owners about the difficulty to care for an octopus, requiring full time dedication.

Barbara J. King, a former anthropologist and primatologist at the College of William & Mary who has written literature on octopuses opposes holding them in captivity.

== See also ==
- My Octopus Teacher
- Paul the Octopus
