= Shark Whisperer =

2025 documentary film

- Directed by: J.P. Stiles, Harrison Macks, and James Reed
- Starring: Ocean Ramsey
- Distributed by: Netflix
- Release date: June 30, 2025

Shark Whisperer is a 2025 documentary film directed by J.P. Stiles, Harrison Macks, and James Reed.

== Synopsis ==
The Shark Whisperer follows Ocean Ramsey and her work as a conservationist.

== Reception ==
Paste magazine wrote that the documentary "dawdles too often in manufactured controversy, but enough of the morbid human drama of Ramsey’s inner life does peek through to make the experience fascinating nonetheless.

In regards to critics of the documentary, Salon.com wrote that "Ramsey’s critics say she’s turned conservation into a spectacle, using footage and photos captured during her dives to promote her personal brand while endorsing the protection of endangered species." Outside Magazine wrote that the "documentary makes clear the soft-spoken Hawaiian marine conservationist doesn’t let her critics distract her from her mission: to use her voice and platform for shark conservation, not demonization."
