= Pippa Ehrlich =

South African filmmaker and conservation journalist

- Citizenship: South Africa
- Education: Journalism and Media Studies
- Alma mater: Rhodes University
- Occupations: Film director, filmmaker, journalist
- Employer: Save Our Seas Foundation
- Organization: Sea Change Project
- Known for: Co-directing My Octopus Teacher (2020)
- Notable work: My Octopus Teacher (2020); Pangolin: Kulu's Journey (2025)
- Awards: Academy Award for Best Documentary Feature; BAFTA Award for Best Documentary

Pippa Ehrlich is a South African Academy Award and BAFTA winning director, filmmaker, and journalist. She is known for co-directing the 2020 documentary My Octopus Teacher.

== Early life and education ==
Ehrlich studied at Journalism and Media Studies at Rhodes University and Hyde Park High School.

== Career ==
Ehrlich for two years was an investigative journalist for the television programme Carte Blanche but with interest in exploring stories about nature and it's relationship with people. Unfortunately she found herself in the world of corporate campaigns and commercial media production. Lately, she was appointed conservation journalist for the Save Our Seas Foundation. She is also a part of the Sea Change Project. She edited a photography book titled Sea Change: Primal Joy and the Art of Underwater Tracking.

She co-directed the 2020 documentary My Octopus Teacher which won the Oscar for Best Documentary Film feature .She also directed the 2025 documentary Pangolin: Kulu's Journey. Her work focuses on stories surrounding conservation, science and the relationship between humans and the natural world.

== See also ==
- Norman Eaton
- James Reed
