= Ocean Ramsey =

American freediver and influencer (born 1987)

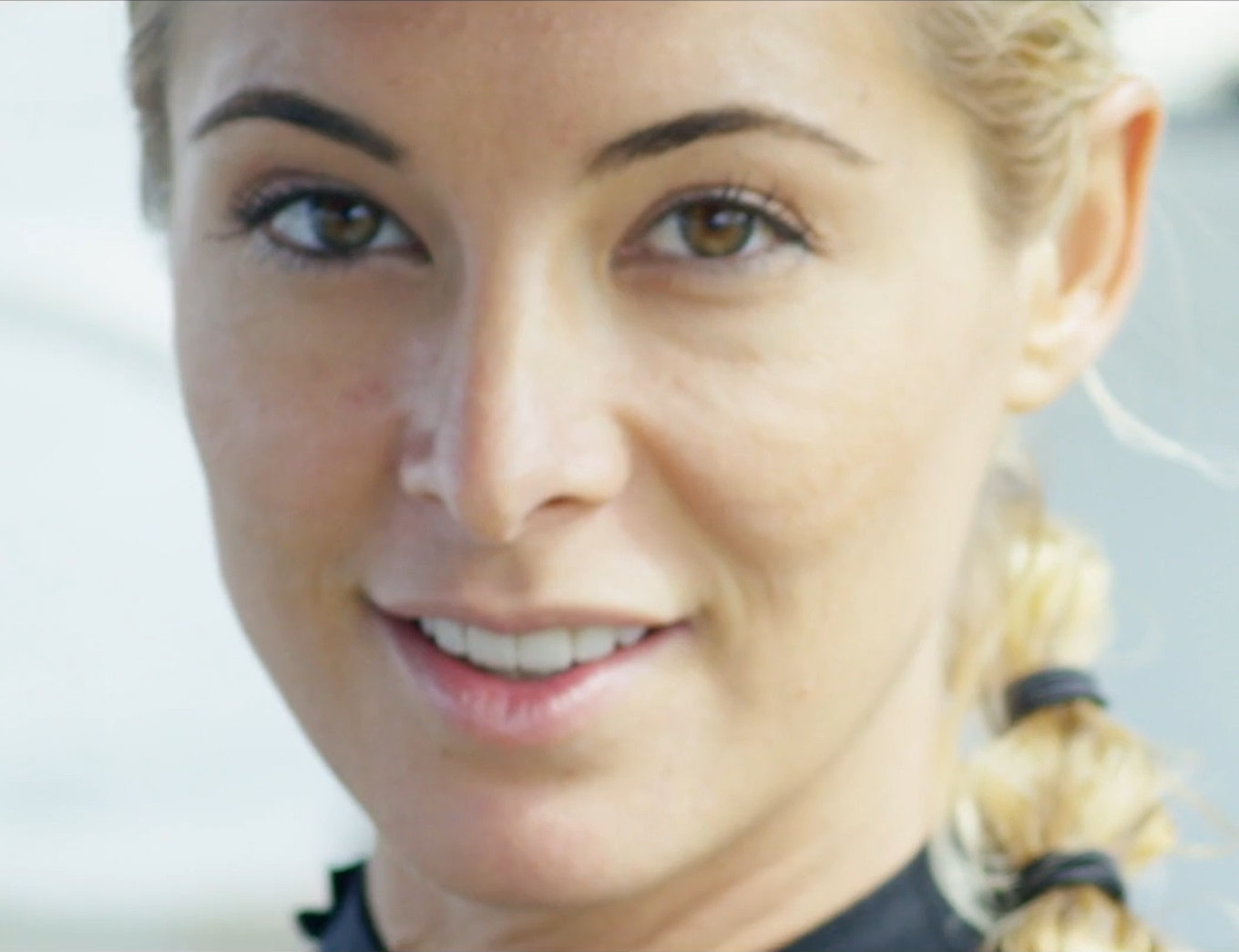
- Ramsey in trailer for She is the Ocean, 2018 film
- Born: 1987 (age 38–39); Oahu, Hawaii, U.S.
- Occupation: Underwater tourism
- Website: https://oceanramsey.org

Ocean Ramsey (born 1987) is an American underwater diver, shark tourism business owner, and social media influencer. She gained international media attention for free diving with sharks, including great white sharks and tiger sharks, to raise awareness about shark conservation and promote her business. She claims to have dived with 47 species of sharks as of 2019.

== Early life ==
Ramsey was born in 1987 on Oʻahu, Hawaii. According to Scuba Diver Life, Ramsey "born and raised in Hawaii and started surfing and diving as a child." Ramsey wrote online in 2013 that she "grew up surfing and diving in Hawaii and San Diego, studied marine biology in college and now lives on Oahu." According to one account, "Rosalind Nicklin and her husband, iconic underwater cameraman Chuck Nicklin" began training Ramsey in shark diving "after a trip to Fiji." Nicklin (1927–2022) co-founded the San Diego Underwater Photographic Society and came to some fame in 1963 when a friend photographed him on the back of a Bryde's whale they had disentangled from a net. Her educational background is obscure; at one time her website claimed she had studied at the University of Hawaiʻi and San Diego State. She legally changed her name from Melissa Dawn Ramsey in California in 2004.

== Career ==
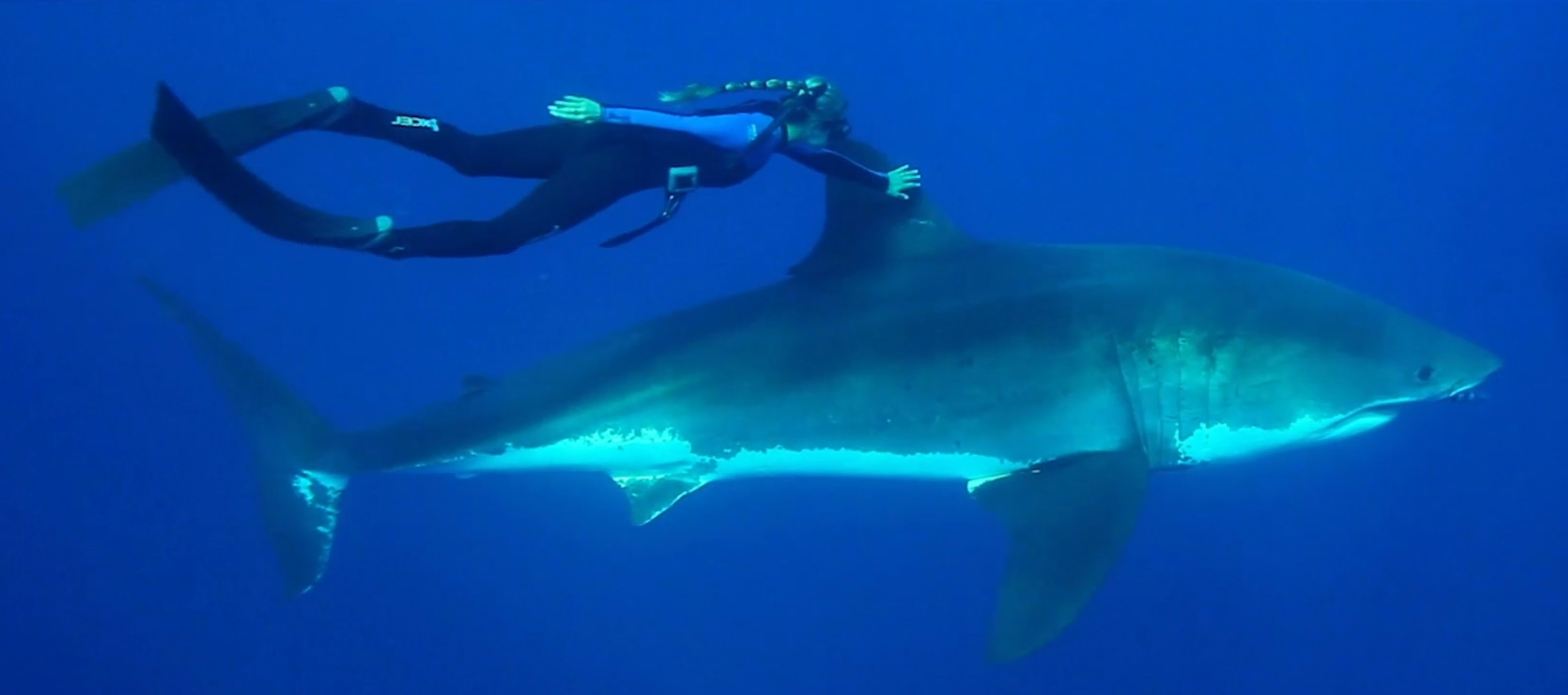
Ramsey swimming with shark in trailer for She is the Ocean, 2018 film

Ramsey worked as a stunt double on Hawaii Five-0 and The Reef 2 in the early 2010s. She was described as "the shark whisperer" in print as early as 2013. She claims to be able to hold her breath underwater for six minutes and 45 seconds. Ramsey operates One Ocean Diving, LLC, a company based in Hawaii that facilitates dives with marine life. Ramsey began conducting "shark tours" off the coast of Hawaii sometime before 2015. As of 2015, tickets for her tours cost $150 each and departed from Haleʻiwa harbor. She is business partners with husband Juan Oliphant, an underwater photographer and videographer. Oliphant grew up on the North Shore of Oʻahu and went to college at Brigham Young University–Hawaii. As of 2018, the couple organized a monthly beach cleanup.

One Ocean Dives is an ecotourism business, and as of 2013, the global "shark tourism" industry generated an estimated annual revenue of $314 million. University of Hawai’i shark researchers have found that free diving with sharks (outside of a shark cage) does not impact the travel patterns of the sharks—they do not follow the people home as potential prey animals—but does pose unnecessary risk to humans, with one known fatality in 2008 when a Bahamas tourist was killed while feeding a shark. A shark bit off a snorkeling tourist's arms in 2025; according to the Turks and Caicos Department of Environment and Coastal Resources she tried to "engage with the animal from the shallows in an attempt to take photographs." Shark bites are overall an "infrequent hazard," and the majority of the fatalities are in six countries (Australia, Brazil, Bahamas, Reunion Island, South Africa, United States), and the vast majority of bites come from just three species: bull, tiger, and great white. Although statistically rare, shark–human encounters, with their potential consequences for both sharks and humans, are increasing in frequency, probably due to a combination of human population expansion "as well as other causative factors, including habitat destruction/modification, water quality, climate change and anomalous weather patterns and the distribution/abundance of prey."

Ramsey is the subject of a 2025 Netflix documentary, the Shark Whisperer which covers both her conservation work and the controversy surrounding her approach.

=== Great white shark encounter ===
In 2019, while filming tiger sharks in Oahu, Ramsey and a film crew encountered a 20-foot-long (6.1 m) female great white shark, initially identified as Deep Blue, and later recognized as Haole Girl. The sharks were feeding on a sperm whale carcass, and there was speculation that the great white was pregnant, and "Harassing a pregnant shark while she is trying to feed could cause her to leave the meal behind, which would then, impact her ability to be able to carry a healthy pregnancy to term, or even reproduce during the next breeding season." The Hawaii Department of Land and Natural Resources' Division of Conservation and Resources Enforcement had advised the public to avoid the carcass and the sharks.

The encounter was captured by Ramsey's then-fiancé, Juan Oliphant, and the footage received worldwide media attention. While she has been praised for raising awareness of the species, she has been criticized for her actions in the footage. Marine biologist Michael Domeier, founding director of the non-profit Marine Conservation Science Institute, criticized Ramsey for appearing in the viral shark interaction video, commenting:

More than 99 percent of sharks are not dangerous. But that happens to be one that is very dangerous. If you want to talk about sharks being not dangerous, get your picture taken with a different species, not that one...If you go on a safari in Botswana, you don’t grab onto the mane of lion and let it drag you around. You just don't do that...There's a balance between the Jaws era when everyone wanted to kill them all and what’s happening now where everyone thinks that they're warm and cuddly and want to ride them. We need to show them our respect, we need to appreciate them.

David Shiffman, a conservation biologist who studies sharks, told The Washington Post: "I can't believe that 'please don't grab the 18-foot long wild predator' is something that needs to be explicitly said out loud but here we are."

Ramsey and her supporters argue that great-white-shark-touch-tank footage is a common good that reduces public paranoia about "bloodthirsty" sharks. The Routledge Book of Ocean Space (2022) argued that Ramsey's actions are part of an ongoing cultural dialogue about "the agency of aquatic nonhumans" and commented that, "...the images circulated sit uncomfortably against best practice in ocean space which advocates a 'don't touch' ethos to limit damage and/or 'stress' to marine life...Scholars might consider, then, how nonhumans that inhabit ocean space might be represented differently?" One Australian diver who runs an scuba diving tourism business reported that his customers, having seen Ocean Ramsey films, have asked him to arrange photos of them hanging on to whale sharks.

== Public image ==
Ramsey had 2.1 million followers on the Instagram platform as of 2025. She posts content on the TikTok platform. She first came to fame with "video and photos of herself riding white sharks off Mexico's Guadalupe Island, where it is illegal to do so. World over, riding on a shark during a dive expedition is considered to be one of the most unethical practices in the business." Ramsey claims that "extensive training and time spent studying shark behavior has kept her team and customers safe. She teaches people about how to act and, more importantly, not act when they encounter a shark in the water."

Maxim magazine posted an article about Ramsey swimming with a whale shark in 2016, described her as a "bikini-clad biologist" and joked that she might be a mermaid, while asking, "Truth be told, Ocean Ramsey's beauty, obvious intelligence, passion for sea creatures—and her name—have us wondering if she's too good to be true." One New Zealand-based media critic, Susan Hopkins, wrote in 2025 that Ramsey is representative of a "sexy conservationism" film genre that, in regards to sharks specifically, both "resists and relies on Jaws mythology and iconography to surf the image economy of new media." Ramsey wears a full-body wetsuit in the great white encounter, but Hopkins reels off a series of films, including the original Jaws itself, Deep Blue Sea, The Shallows, and 47 Meters Down: Uncaged, that she argues have titillated audiences with images of "bikini-clad young women juxtaposed with dangerous sharks." Hopkins argues that it remains to be seen if Ramsey is correct in asserting that "the way to enact influence and activism is through instagrammable images of beautiful models in high risk situations."

== Controversies ==
=== Credentials ===
Ramsey has faced criticism for lying about participation in shark research. If Ramsey was a marine biologist, she would "engage in the scientific study of living organisms...which involves research, data collection, analysis, and contributing to scientific knowledge through various publications." Ramsey sells branded merchandise, self-publishes her writing about sharks, has published no peer-reviewed research, has shared no data sets with the public, and has criticized the scientific method as "an old school, ego-driven approach that prioritises 'data collection' over 'animal welfare'."

A scientist associated with Simon Fraser University in Vancouver, who is on the board of directors of American Elasmobranch Society, wrote in 2025, "Ocean Ramsey does not collect data, does not publish research, does not collaborate with researchers who do except for a study testing the effectiveness of shark repellent where her role is not clear, does not present at scientific conferences, does not train students in research methods, does not have research ethics permits for her activities, regularly misrepresents her own expertise and credentials, and regularly shares unequivocally factually incorrect statements about background issues related to shark biology and conservation despite being repeatedly corrected."

Carl Meyer of the University of Hawaiʻi's Institute of Marine Biology Shark Research Lab said in 2025 of Ramsey's claims that "Posing with sharks on Instagram is not scientific research. Kim Holland, of the same institution, asserted, "There's been so many shark documentaries that I think the education/conservation value is reaching a point of diminishing return."

=== Allegations of exploitative labor practices ===
In October 2026, three divers formerly employed by One Ocean stated that "they were asked to work long hours, sometimes without pay, and that Ramsey...was physically abusive toward them on the job." According to Surfer magazine, the former employees described "systemic bullying, intimidation, and the aggressive silencing of young female divers through strict non-disclosure agreements and non-compete clauses." Ramsey replied, via People, that, "I do not believe the allegations being circulated accurately represent our company, either historically or today." In November 2026, Honolulu Civil Beat reported that at least 12 former employees had posted on social media about their negative experiences working for One Ocean, describing "lengthy unpaid training periods that culminated in a '30-day push' during which they were forced to work for 30 days straight without pay."

== Filmography ==
- Hawaii Five-0 (2011), stunt double
- The Reef 2 (2012), stunt double
- "the next Captain America film" (2013)
- Reef Madness (2014), produced by Harry Rabin
- "Why the world needs sharks," TEDxKlagenfurt, Klagenfurt, Austria (September 2015)
- She Is the Ocean (2018), directed by Inna Blokhina
- Saving Jaws (2019), directed by Keoni Bowthorpe
- Hawaii Travel Tips: Marine Animal Protection, Hawaiʻi Tourism Authority (2019)
- Envoy: Shark Cull (2021)
- Shark Whisperer (2025), cinematography by Keoni Bowthorpe – Netflix

=== Other notable clips ===
- "Hitching a ride" on dorsal fin of 17-foot great white shark (February 2013) – posted to GoPro's YouTube, posted elsewhere as "A Blonde and a Great White Shark," shared and publicized by Daily Mail, Huffington Post, Good Morning America
- "Ocean Ramsey and a Whale Shark" (2016), GoPro Award winner
- Whale song audible while free diving near a shiver of sharks (September 2026)

== See also ==
- Index of underwater divers
- Outline of underwater divers
- Shark as food
- Shark finning
- Shark culling
- Shark sanctuary
- Important Shark and Ray Area
- List of threatened sharks
- List of fishes of Hawaii
- Nature conservation
- Keystone species
- Anthropomorphism
- Sharks in popular culture
- Shark Week
- International Shark Attack File
- Shark (2015 British TV series)
- Ocean with David Attenborough (2025)
