= My Octopus Teacher =

2020 documentary film by Pippa Ehrlich and James Reed

- Directed by: Pippa Ehrlich; James Reed
- Written by: Pippa Ehrlich; James Reed
- Produced by: Craig Foster
- Starring: Craig Foster; Tom Foster; Octopus
- Cinematography: Roger Horrocks
- Edited by: Pippa Ehrlich; Dan Schwalm
- Music by: Kevin Smuts
- Production companies: Off The Fence; The Sea Change Project
- Distributed by: Netflix
- Release dates: 4 September 2020 (Millennium Docs Against Gravity); 7 September 2020 (Netflix)
- Running time: 85 minutes
- Country: South Africa
- Language: English

My Octopus Teacher is a 2020 Netflix Original documentary film directed by Pippa Ehrlich and James Reed. It documents a year spent by filmmaker Craig Foster forging a relationship with a wild common octopus in a South African kelp forest. The film won Best Documentary Feature at the 93rd Academy Awards.

Common Octopus

== Synopsis ==
In 2018, Craig Foster began free-diving in a cold underwater kelp forest at a remote location in False Bay, near Cape Town, South Africa. The location was near Simon's Town on the Cape Peninsula, which is exposed to the cold Benguela current of the Atlantic Ocean.

Foster started to document his experiences, and, in time, met a curious young octopus that captured his attention. The film shows Foster's growing intimate relationship with the octopus as he follows her around for nearly a year. They form an individual bond, and she plays with Foster and allows him into her world to see how she sleeps, lives, and eats. She frequently has to defend herself against pyjama sharks. In one attack, the octopus loses an arm, and she then retreats to her den to recover, slowly regenerating the arm over three months. In a later shark attack, she shows an incredibly improved creativity to survive, including sticking on the shark's back. After mating with a male octopus and producing numerous eggs, she dies naturally while tending to her eggs. Later, a shark scavenges her dead body and carries it off.

Foster describes the effect of this mentorship-like relationship the octopus provided him, teaching him a lesson on the fragility of life and humanity's connection with nature. This transfers to Foster creating a deeper bond with his son, Tom, as the boy develops as a diver and marine biology student.

== Production ==
In partnership with The Sea Change Project, Off The Fence, and ZDF Enterprises, My Octopus Teacher was executive produced by Ellen Windemuth. It was directed by Pippa Ehrlich and James Reed. Cinematography was handled by underwater cameraman Roger Horrocks, with additional footage from Craig Foster and Roger Horrocks; some underwater footage, not shown in the film, but filmed by the pair at the same location, had previously been included in Episode 5 of Blue Planet II (2017).

Foster was also the film's producer, via his involvement with The Sea Change Project, and his wife, Indian environmental journalist Swati Thiyagarajan, was the production manager.

The film, which Foster began filming in 2018, was years in the making, and was the first South African nature documentary to be a Netflix Original.

== Reception and legacy ==
My Octopus Teacher was released for streaming on Netflix on 7 September 2020.

The film received critical acclaim. On the review aggregator website Rotten Tomatoes, 93% of 44 critics' reviews of the film are positive, with an average rating of 7.7/10; the site's "critics consensus" reads: "A heartwarming look at the way a meaningful bond can transcend just about any barrier, this documentary will leave you asking your friends to come and see My Octopus Teacher with you." On Metacritic, the film has a weighted average score of 82% based on reviews from 5 critics, indicating "universal acclaim".

The film was spoofed in the 2022 Documentary Now episode "My Monkey Grifter".

== Accolades ==
Award nominations for My Octopus Teacher
Award	Date of ceremony	Category	Recipient(s)	Result	Ref.
Academy Awards	25 April 2021	Best Documentary Feature	Pippa Ehrlich, James Reed and Craig Foster	Won	
American Cinema Editors Awards	17 April 2021	Best Edited Documentary (Feature)	Pippa Ehrlich and Dan Schwalm	Won	
British Academy Film Awards	11 April 2021	Best Documentary	Pippa Ehrlich, James Reed and Craig Foster	Won	
Cinema Audio Society Awards	17 April 2021	Outstanding Achievement in Sound Mixing for a Motion Picture – Documentary	Barry Donnelly and Charl Mostert	Nominated	
Cinema Eye Honors Awards	9 March 2021	Audience Choice Prize	Pippa Ehrlich and James Reed	Nominated	
Cinema Eye Honors Awards	9 March 2021	Outstanding Achievement in Cinematography	Roger Horrocks	Nominated	
LabMeCrazy! Science Film Festival	4 February 2021	Best Documentary	Pippa Ehrlich and Dan Schwalm	Won	
Critics' Choice Documentary Awards	16 November 2020	Best Cinematography	Roger Horrocks	Won	
Critics' Choice Documentary Awards	16 November 2020	Best Science/Nature Documentary	My Octopus Teacher	Won	
Critics' Choice Documentary Awards	16 November 2020	Best Narration	Craig Foster	Nominated	
Critics' Choice Documentary Awards	16 November 2020	Best Documentary	My Octopus Teacher	Nominated	
Directors Guild of America Awards	10 April 2021	Outstanding Directional Achievement in Documentary	Pippa Ehrlich and James Reed	Nominated	
EarthxFilm Festival	26 April 2020	Best Feature Film	The Octopus Teacher	Won	
GREEN SCREEN Wildlife Film Festival	12 September 2020	Best Film	Pippa Ehrlich and James Reed	Won	
GREEN SCREEN Wildlife Film Festival	12 September 2020	Best Marine Film	Pippa Ehrlich and James Reed	Won	
GREEN SCREEN Wildlife Film Festival	12 September 2020	Best Story	Pippa Ehrlich and James Reed	Won	
GREEN SCREEN Wildlife Film Festival	12 September 2020	Best Independent Production	Pippa Ehrlich and James Reed	Nominated	
GREEN SCREEN Wildlife Film Festival	12 September 2020	Best Score	Kevin Smuts	Nominated	
GREEN SCREEN Wildlife Film Festival	12 September 2020	Heinz Sielmann Award	Pippa Ehrlich and James Reed	Nominated	
Guangzhou International Documentary Film Festival	17 December 2020	Best Documentary Director	Pippa Ehrlich and James Reed	Won	
Houston Film Critics Society Awards	18 January 2021	Best Documentary Feature	My Octopus Teacher	Won	
International Documentary Association Awards	16 January 2021	Best Music Score	Kevin Smuts	Won	
International Documentary Association Awards	16 January 2021	Best Writing	Pippa Ehrlich and James Reed	Nominated	
International Documentary Association Awards	16 January 2021	Pare Lorentz Award	Pippa Ehrlich, James Reed and Craig Foster	Won	
Jackson Hole Film Festival	1 October 2020	Grand Teton Award	My Octopus Teacher	Won	
Jackson Hole Film Festival	1 October 2020	Best People & Nature Film – Long Form	My Octopus Teacher	Won	
Jackson Hole Film Festival	1 October 2020	Best Science in Nature Film – Long Form	My Octopus Teacher	Won	
Jackson Hole Film Festival	1 October 2020	Best Editing	Pippa Ehrlich, Dan Schwalm and Jinx Godfrey	Won	
Jackson Hole Film Festival	1 October 2020	Best Ecosystem Film – Long Form	My Octopus Teacher	Nominated	
Jackson Hole Film Festival	1 October 2020	Best Feature Film	My Octopus Teacher	Nominated	
Jackson Hole Film Festival	1 October 2020	Best Cinematography	Roger Horrocks and Craig Foster	Nominated	
Jackson Hole Film Festival	1 October 2020	Best Original Music Score	Kevin Smuts	Nominated	
Jackson Hole Film Festival	1 October 2020	Best Audioscape	Barry Donnelly	Nominated	
Motion Picture Sound Editors Awards	16 April 2021	Outstanding Achievement in Sound Editing – Feature Documentary	Barry Donnelly and Charl Mostert	Nominated	
Producers Guild of America Awards	24 March 2021	Outstanding Producer of Documentary Theatrical Motion Pictures	Craig Foster	Won	
San Diego Film Critics Society Awards	11 January 2021	Best Documentary Film	My Octopus Teacher	Nominated	
St. Louis Film Critics Association Awards	17 January 2021	Best Documentary Feature	My Octopus Teacher	Nominated	

== See also ==
- Octopus vulgaris
- Terrance the octopus
