= James Reed (filmmaker) =

British filmmaker

James Reed is a British filmmaker known for documentaries such as Shark Whisperer, Chimp Empire, and My Octopus Teacher, the latter of which earned him an Academy Award in 2020.

== Biography ==
Reed graduated from Prudhoe Community High School in 1997 and went on to attend University of Leeds where he studied Zoology. He founded Underdog Films in 2015.

Reed won an Academy Award in 2020 for his co-directing of My Octopus Teacher. He followed up with Chimp Empire, a Netflix documentary he directed and produced. In 2022 he signed a one year agreement with BBC to work with its commercial producer-distributor on natural history feature documentaries. While with the BBC, he directed an episode of Frozen Planet II.

== Select filmography ==
- 2015, Jago: A Life Underwater, director
- 2017, Rise of the Warrior Apes, director
- 2020, My Octopus Teacher, co-director
- 2023, Chimp Empire, director, producer
- 2025, Shark Whisperer, director
