= Deep Blue (great white shark) =

One of the largest great white sharks ever recorded

- Species: Carcharodon carcharias
- Sex: Female
- Known for: One of the largest great white sharks recorded
- Weight: Estimated >2,000 kg (4,400 lb)

Deep Blue is a female great white shark that is estimated to be 6.1 m (20 ft) long or larger and is now fifty years old. She is believed to be one of the largest ever recorded in history. The shark was first spotted in Mexico by researcher Mauricio Hoyos Padilla. Deep Blue was featured on the Discovery Channel's Shark Week. The shark was spotted by marine biologists studying tiger sharks near the island of Oahu, Hawaii. Various videos show the shark as calm and non-aggressive around humans and even dolphins.

== Discovery ==
Deep Blue was first documented at Isla de Guadalupe, Mexico, in 1999. She was filmed more extensively a second time at Guadalupe in late 2013 when she was filmed as part of Shark Week off the coast of Guadalupe Island, Mexico, aboard the MV Horizon charter vessel. Deep Blue's popularity increased when a viral video of her was posted to Facebook in 2015 by Padilla. Deep Blue's exposure increased further when she was spotted scavenging for food from a sperm whale carcass in Hawaii by researchers who had been in the area to monitor tiger sharks. Due to the amount of interest, a Twitter account about her was created. Deep Blue is in a documentary.

== Overview ==
Deep Blue is estimated to be 6.1 m (20 ft) long and weigh over 2 t (2.2 short tons; 2.0 long tons). Her size is disputed, with smaller estimates between 18 and 19 ft (5.5 and 5.8 m) in length. Her age is unknown as there are no reliable means to determine a living adult white shark without performing a necropsy. Deep Blue has noticeable pigmentation and markings on her body. She had a large laceration over her right side between her right pelvic fin and primary dorsal fin. However, this injury was fully healed and only showed as a faint scar when she was photographed in 2019. In addition to her length, her body has noticeable girth, indicating she may have been pregnant. Deep Blue was identified by researchers by her size and the pattern of where the grey colouring meets the white underside. Shark photographer George Probst notes that a shark's countershading pattern is unique to each individual of the species and is analogous to a human fingerprint.

== Interactions with humans ==
Despite the large size of Deep Blue, she has been filmed not aggressively at all approaching one diver and even tolerating the presence of other scuba divers close by, even allowing free diver and model Ocean Ramsey, to hold on to one of her fins while swimming with her. However, multiple sources disputed that the shark encountered by Ramsey was Deep Blue and was more likely to be Haole Girl. Prior to this interaction, the shark is said to have already fed on some of the whale carcass, which may have contributed to her placid behavior around the divers. When Deep Blue was filmed in Mexico a few years before, she was seen calmly swimming around the shark cage and only taking curious bites at the cage; she did not attack Padillo, who had been on top of the cage and exposed. The diver was even able to touch her fin, stating he was trying to push her away from the cage.

== Criticism and identity ==
Ramsey's video of her touching and holding onto the shark has brought on some criticism from shark researchers. David Shiffman, a marine biologist, criticised Ramsey's behaviour and stated that the shark should not be interfered with, stating that it is an enormous wild predator and that repeated contact from humans can overstress the animal. Michael Domeier, another shark researcher, also criticised Ramsey's behaviour. Domeier stated that the number one rule of shark diving was not to touch the sharks. Both researchers considered Ramsey's behaviour as essentially harassing the animal.

In addition to his criticism of Ramsey, Domeier believed that the shark encountered by Ramsey was not Deep Blue and was likely to be Haole Girl, a newly discovered great white shark that Domeier believed was pregnant.
