= X-79 =

- Class symbol

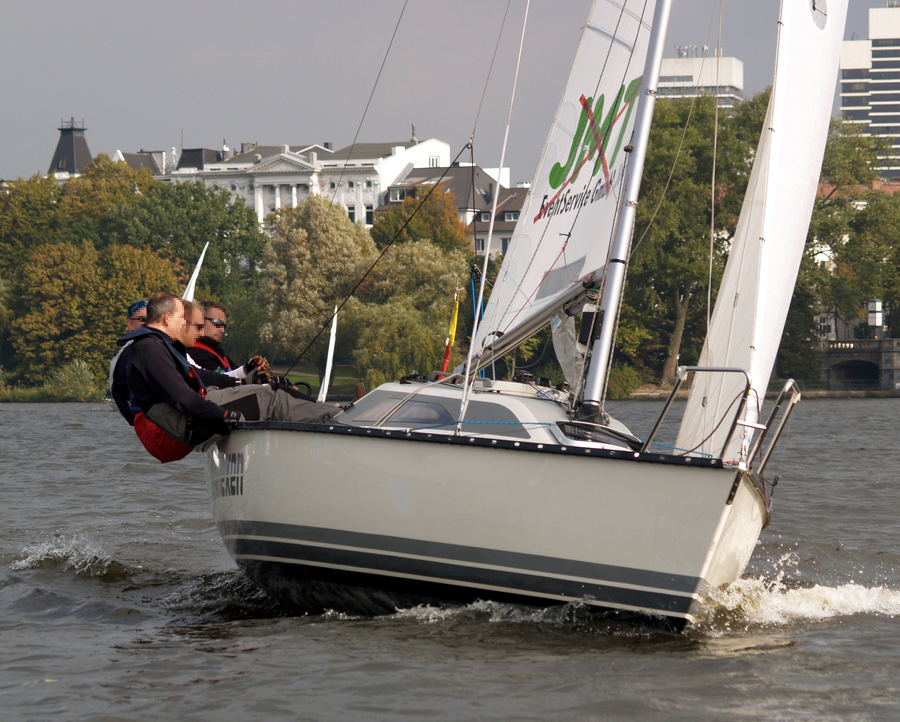
- X-79 in 2006.

Development
- Designer: Niels Jeppesen
- Year: 1979
- Builder: X-Yachts

Boat
- Draft: 1.37 m (4.5 ft)

Hull
- LOA: 7.93 m (26.0 ft)
- LWL: 6.40 m (21.0 ft)
- Beam: 2.88 m (9.4 ft)

X-79 is a 7.93-metre (26.0 ft) sailboat class designed by Niels Jeppesen and built in about 500 copies.

== History ==
Niels Jeppesen designed the X-79 to compete in the Sjælland Rundt.

== See also ==
- X-99

== Links ==
- X-79 resource site
