= Sailing yacht =

Private sailing vessel with overnight accommodations

Sailing yachts

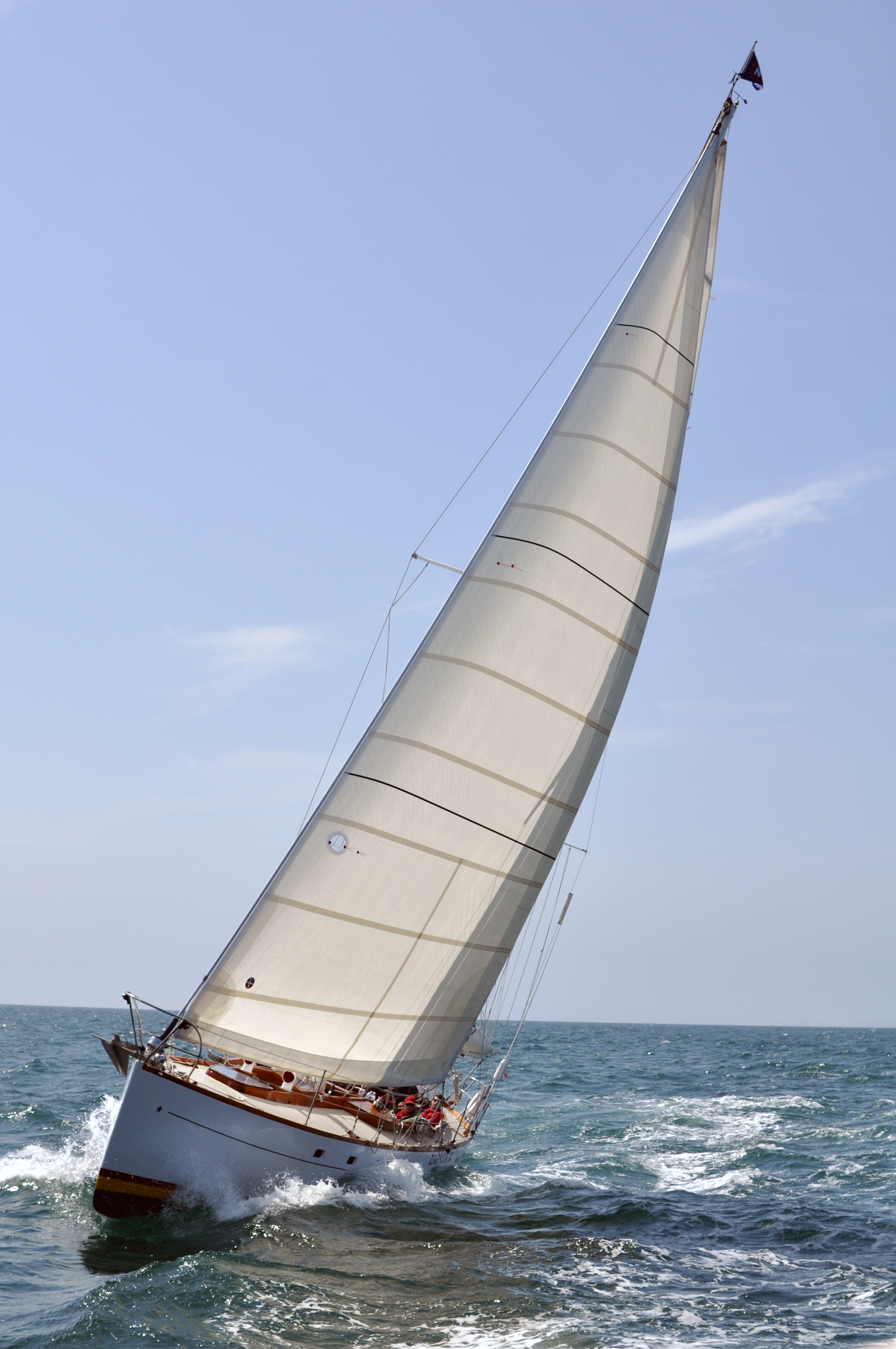
50-foot (15 m) cruising yacht, Zapata II, in 2013

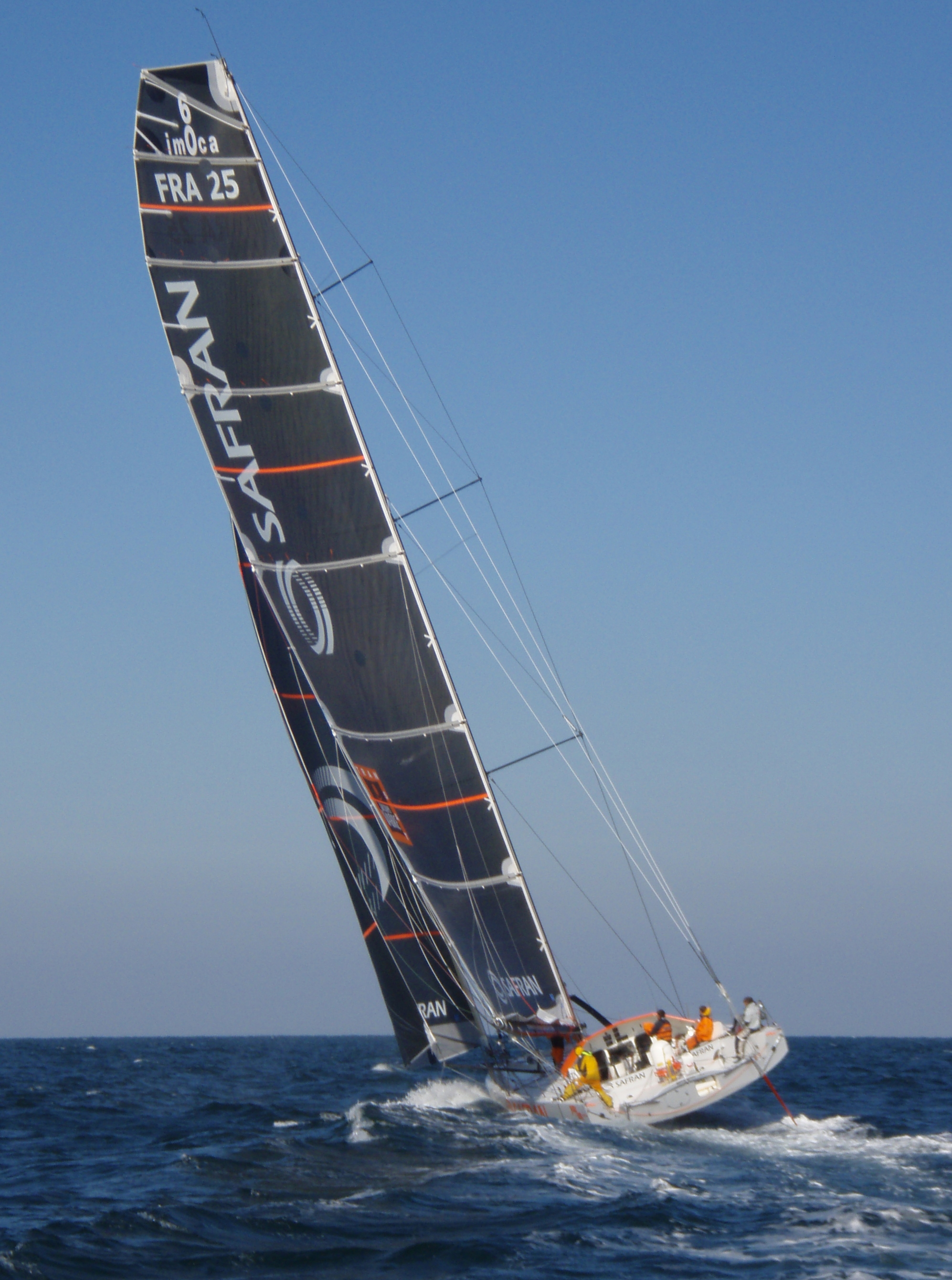
60-foot (18 m) ocean racing yacht, Safran, in 2007

Cruising and racing yachts embody different tradeoffs between comfort and performance.

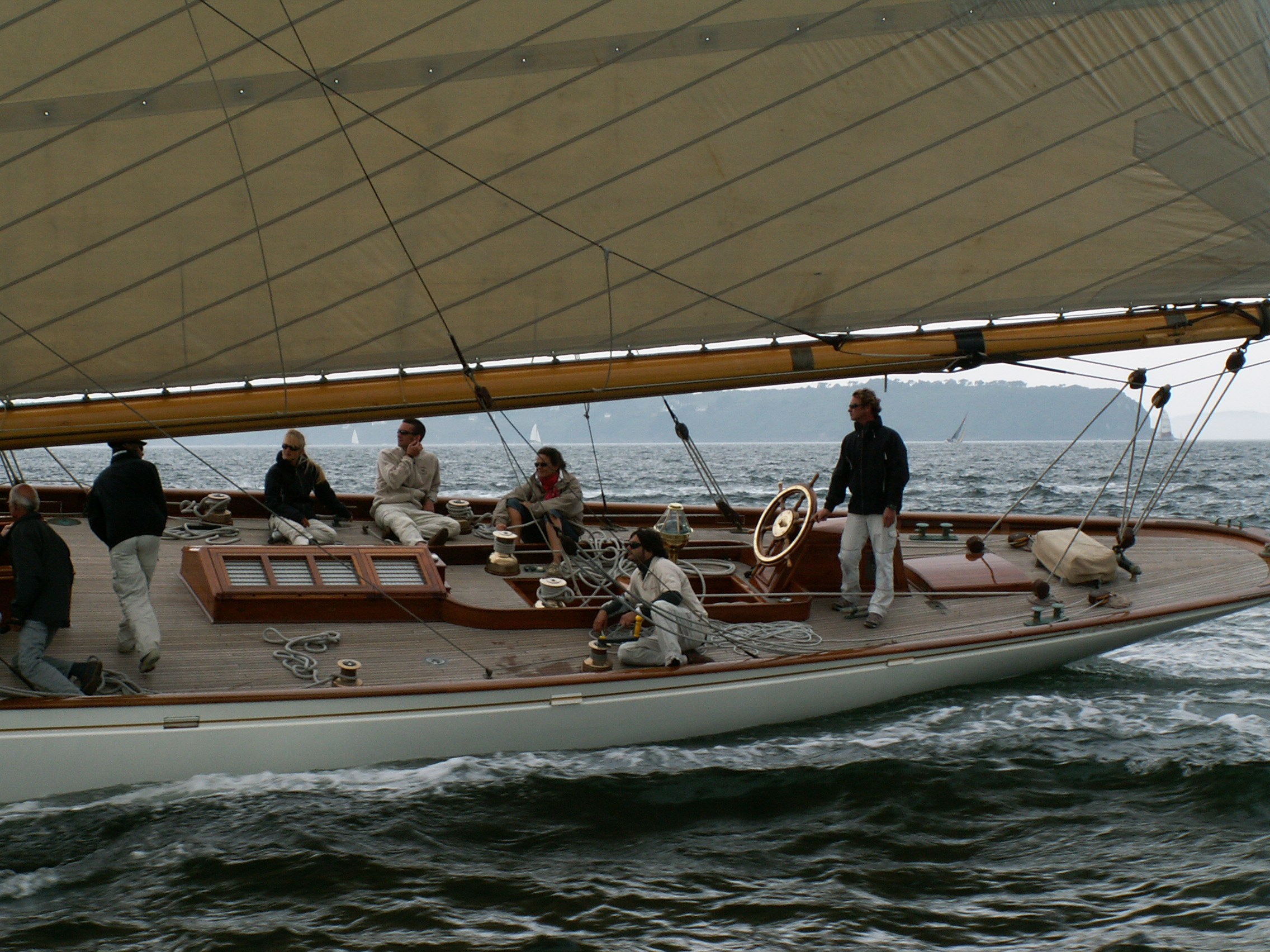
Cockpit of classic racing yacht, Moonbeam of Fife, under sail in 2008

A sailing yacht (US ship prefixes SY or S/Y), is a yacht that uses sails as its primary means of propulsion. The term applies to recreational sailing vessels as opposed to a "boat".

Sailing yachts are actively used in sport and are among categories recognized by the governing body of sailing sports, World Sailing.

== Etymology ==
The term yacht originates from the Dutch word jacht (pl. jachten, which means "hunt"), and originally referred to light, fast sailing vessels that the Dutch Republic navy used to pursue pirates and other transgressors around and into the shallow waters of the Low Countries.

== History ==
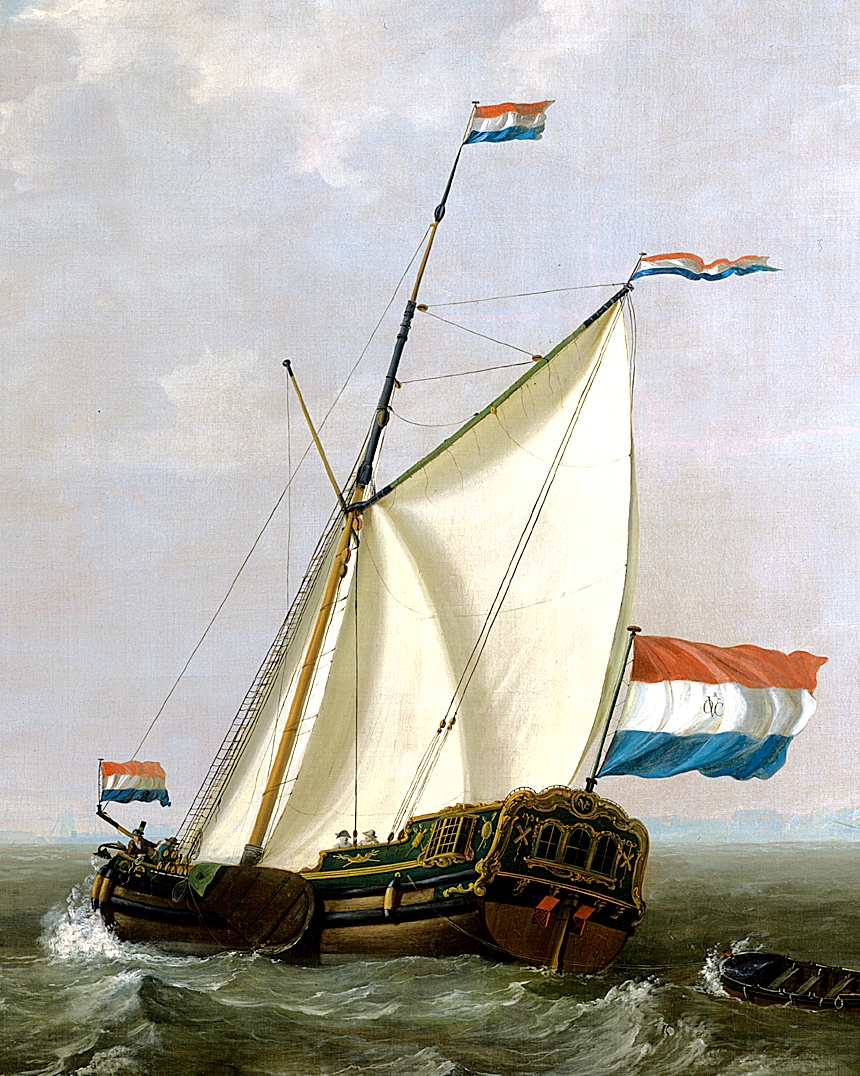
An 18th-century Dutch jacht

The history of pleasure boats begins with rowed craft in Pharaonic Egyptian times. The history of sailing yachts begins in Europe in the beginning of the 1600s with the building of a pleasure vessel for the son of King James I of England. Pleasure vessels acquired the name yacht after the time of Charles II, who spent time exiled in Europe and visited the Netherlands, where a variety of jachten were already well developed as pleasure boats for the elite classes since the beginning of the 17th century. Upon his restoration to the English crown, Charles commissioned a series of royal yachts, which included at least one experimental catamaran. The first recorded yacht race between two vessels occurred in 1661, followed by the first open sailing competition in 1663 in English waters.

Starting in 1739, England found itself in a series of wars—a period that saw a decline in yachting. In Ireland, however, the gentry enjoyed yachting and founded the first yacht club in Cork as the Cork Harbor Water Club in 1720, followed by the Lough Ree Yacht Club in 1770. English yacht racing continued among the English gentry who founded England's oldest yacht club in 1775 to support a fleet at Cumberland. With maritime peace, starting in 1815, came a resurgence of interest in yachting. Boatbuilders, who had been making fast vessels both for smugglers and the government revenue cutters, turned their skills again to yachts.

=== Evolution of design ===
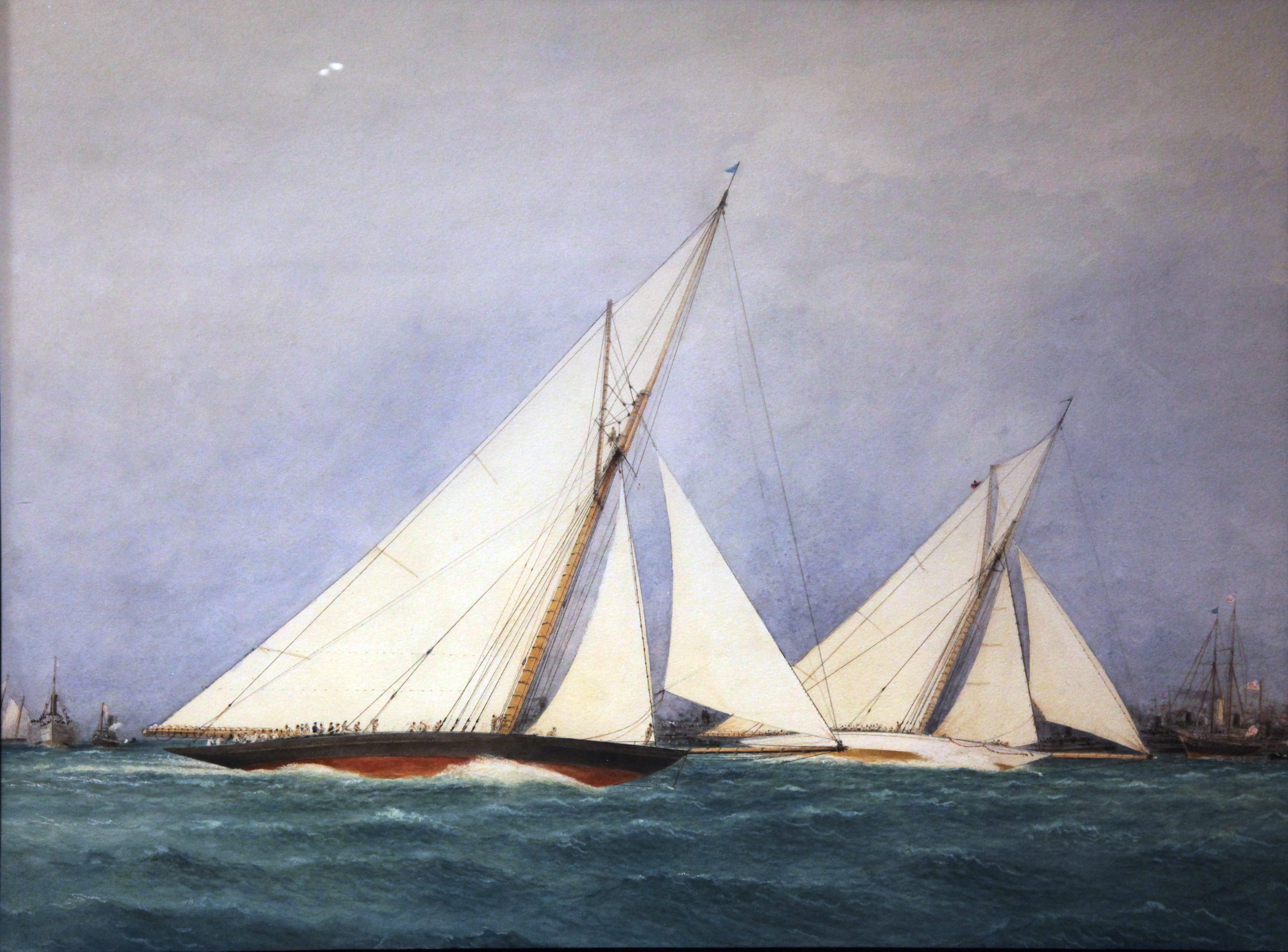
1893 America's Cup match between Vigilant and Valkyrie II

The fast yachts of the early 19th century were typically luggers, schooners, or sloops with fore-and-aft rigs. By the 1850s, yachts featured large sail areas, a narrow beam, and a deeper draft than was customary until then. Racing between yachts owned by wealthy patrons was common, with large wagers at stake. The America's Cup arose out of a contest between the yacht, America, and its English competitors. Both countries had rules by which to rate yachts, the English by tonnage and the American by length.

English and American design philosophies for sailing yachts diverged in the early 1800s: the English favoring a narrow beam (width) and a deep-draft keel and the Americans favoring a broad beam and a shallow draft with a moveable centerboard to provide lateral resistance and righting moment. In 1851, when the yacht America crossed to England, the two design philosophies were converging back towards each other. America's pointed, convex bow and maximum beam, placed aft, influenced British designs, thanks to her racing successes against the British competition. American yachtsmen, in turn, found that their shallow "skimming-dish" designs were not faster or safer than the visiting English yachts.

By the turn of the 20th century, racing yachts featured long overhangs, fore and aft, and a narrow, deep keel by historic standards. Along the way, yacht designers discovered that handicapping rules based on tonnage or length were not good indicators of performance, although they remained a basis for taxation in the two home countries.

=== Cruising yachts ===
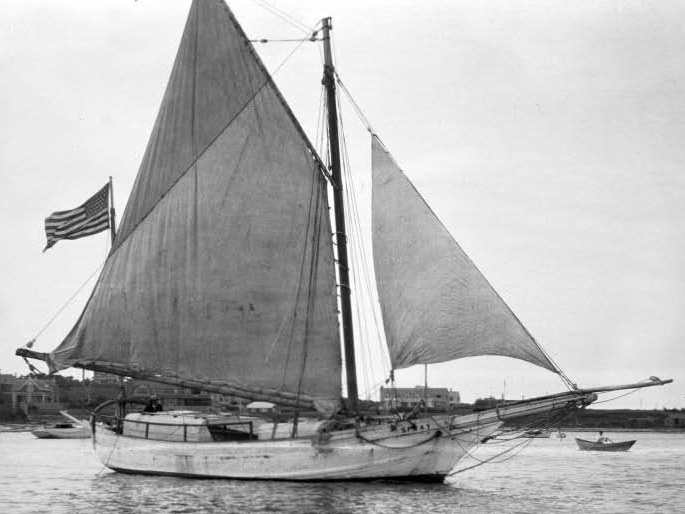
Joshua Slocum's Spray in 1898

The prevalent purpose of yachting under sail in the 19th century was racing. Boats would cross the Atlantic to engage the yachts of other owners in contests of speed. Cruising was the provenance of the most wealthy in large, luxurious yachts that had reliable auxiliary power or were solely steam-powered yachts.

Early explorers in smaller sailing craft wrote of their experiences cruising the lakes and canals of Europe in a sailing canoe (John MacGregor) and the near-shore waters of England and Scotland in a 20-foot (6.1 m) cutter (R.T. McMullen). In the late 1800s some cruising adventurers converted fishing vessels and pilot boats into cruising boats. The most notable of these was Joshua Slocum's Spray, a converted work boat in which he accomplished the first single-handed circumnavigation (1895-98).

=== Racing yachts ===
In the 20th century, cruising yacht design evolved past the handicapping rules-based designs of the 19th century towards more sea-kindly hull designs. In the 1930s yacht hulls were designed with a "fisherman" underbody, whereby the slope of the bow continued to the fullest extent of the draft and then carried horizontally aft. Noted yacht designers, such as John Alden and Starling Burgess employed this configuration. Starting in the 1920s several new rating rules were devised by the Cruising Club of America and the Royal Ocean Racing Club in order to handicap yachts of different designs that were expected to compete against one another. Successful designers of this era were Olin Stephens, Philip Rhodes, Aage Nielson, and C. Raymond Hunt. The International Offshore Racing (IOR) rule supplanted the previous rules in 1970 to provide a fairer basis for handicapping racing yachts. This rule promoted the use of fin keels and blade rudders. This rule was augmented with the International Measurement System (IMS) to assure safe designs for extreme conditions, following the disastrous 1979 Fastnet Race in which only 86 of the 303 participants finished owing to failed equipment and loss of 19 lives and five boats.

== Cruising ==
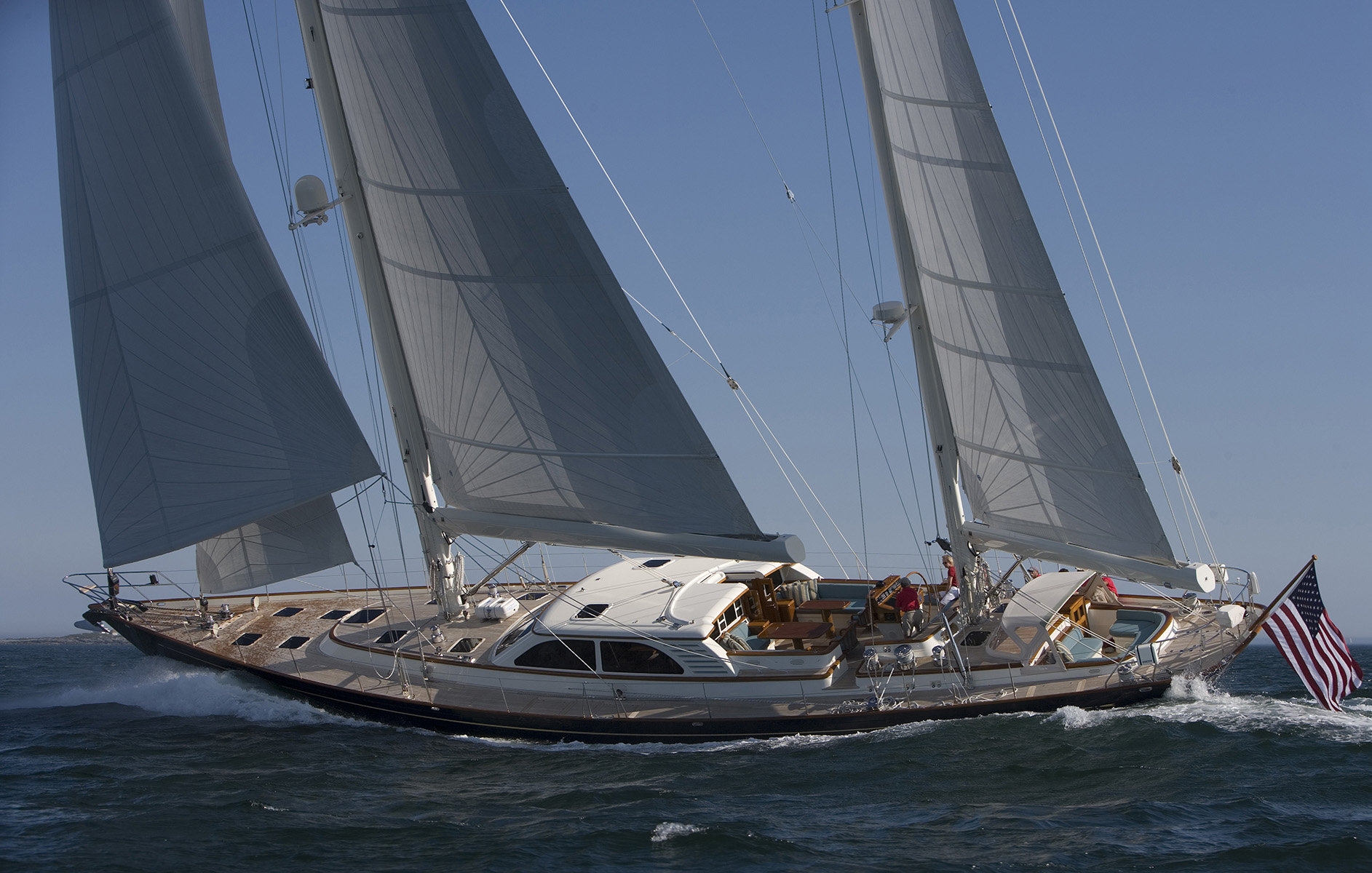
Cruising ketch, Windcrest in 2007

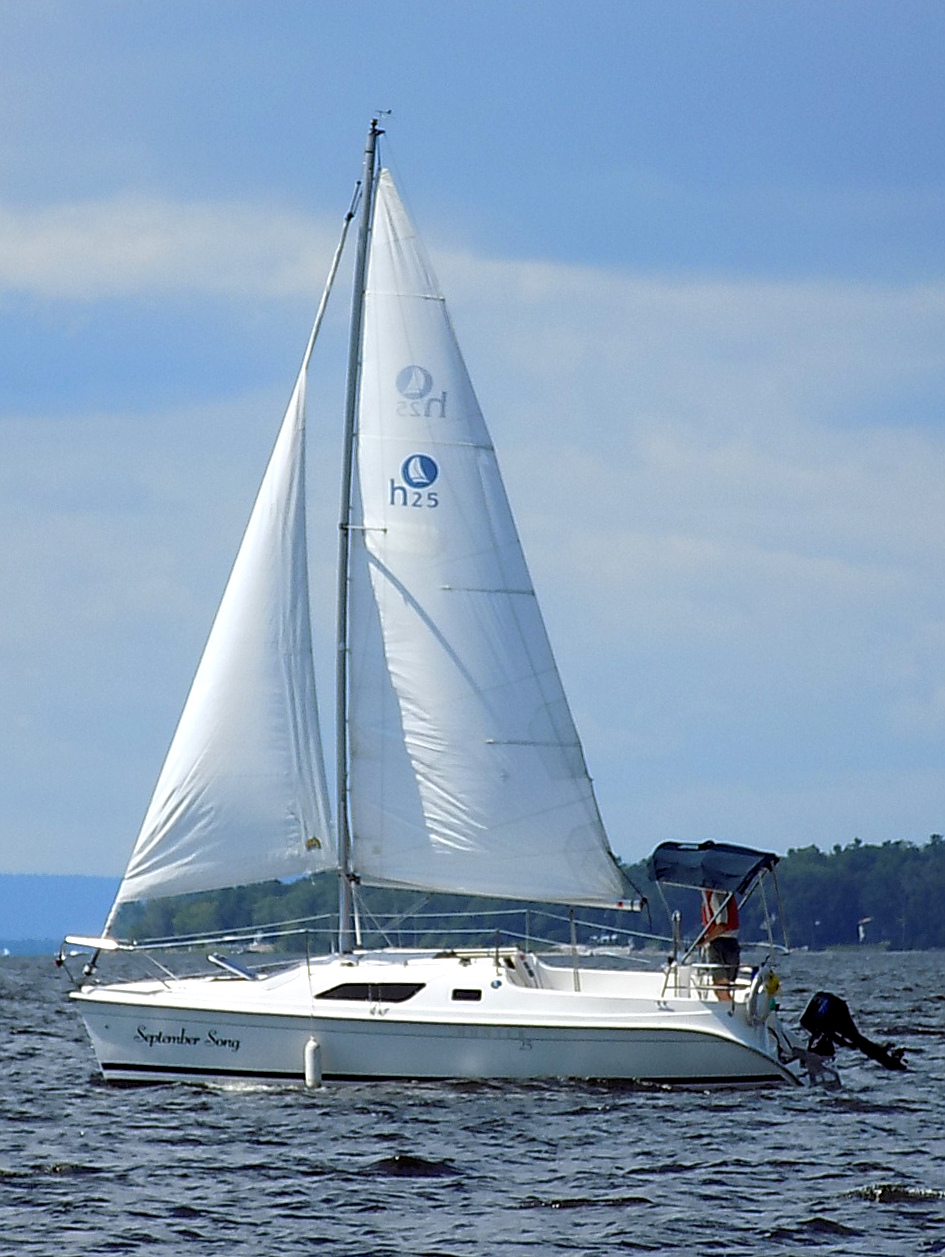
Small sailing yacht with outboard motor in 2017

Cruising yachts may be designed for near-shore use or for passage-making. They may also be raced, but they are designed and built with the comfort and amenities necessary for overnight voyages. Qualities considered in cruising yachts include: performance, comfort under way, ease of handling, stability, living comfort, durability, ease of maintenance, and affordability of ownership.

=== Categories ===
Cruising sailboats share the common attribute of providing overnight accommodations. They may be classified as small (easy to haul behind a trailer), near-shore and off-shore. Multihull sailing yachts are a category, apart.

- Small yachts are designed for sheltered coastal waters, bays inlets, lakes and rivers. Small sailing are typically shorter than 33 feet (10 m) length overall. The Royal Yachting Association (RYA) design category "D" addresses yachts that are fit for wind force 4—16 knots (8.2 m/s)—and 1.6-foot (0.5 m) maximum wave heights.

Trailer sailers that are readily towed by a car are generally shorter than 25 feet (7.6 m) length overall and weigh less than 5,000 pounds (2,300 kg). They are sometimes called pocket cruisers and may be trimarans with folding outriggers. Considerations for their design include: a shallow draft for launching, likely supplemented by a centerboard for performance under sail, sail area/displacement ratio as a measure of stability, displacement/length ratio as a measure of efficiency in propelling it through the water, and by its interior space—both interior height and volume.

- Near-shore yachts are designed for exposed coastal waters, bays inlets, lakes and rivers. Near-shore cruising sailboats typically range in size from 33–45 feet (10–14 m) length overall. The RYA design category "C" addresses yachts that are fit for wind force 6—27 knots (14 m/s)—and 6.6-foot (2 m) wave heights.
- Offshore yachts are designed for ocean passages and extended voyages. Offshore cruising sailboats typically exceed 45 feet (14 m) length overall. The RYA has two design categories for yachts used in this context: "A" yachts are fit for conditions that exceed wind force 8—40 knots (21 m/s)—and 13-foot (4 m) wave heights. "B" yachts are fit for conditions up to that threshold.

=== Design ===
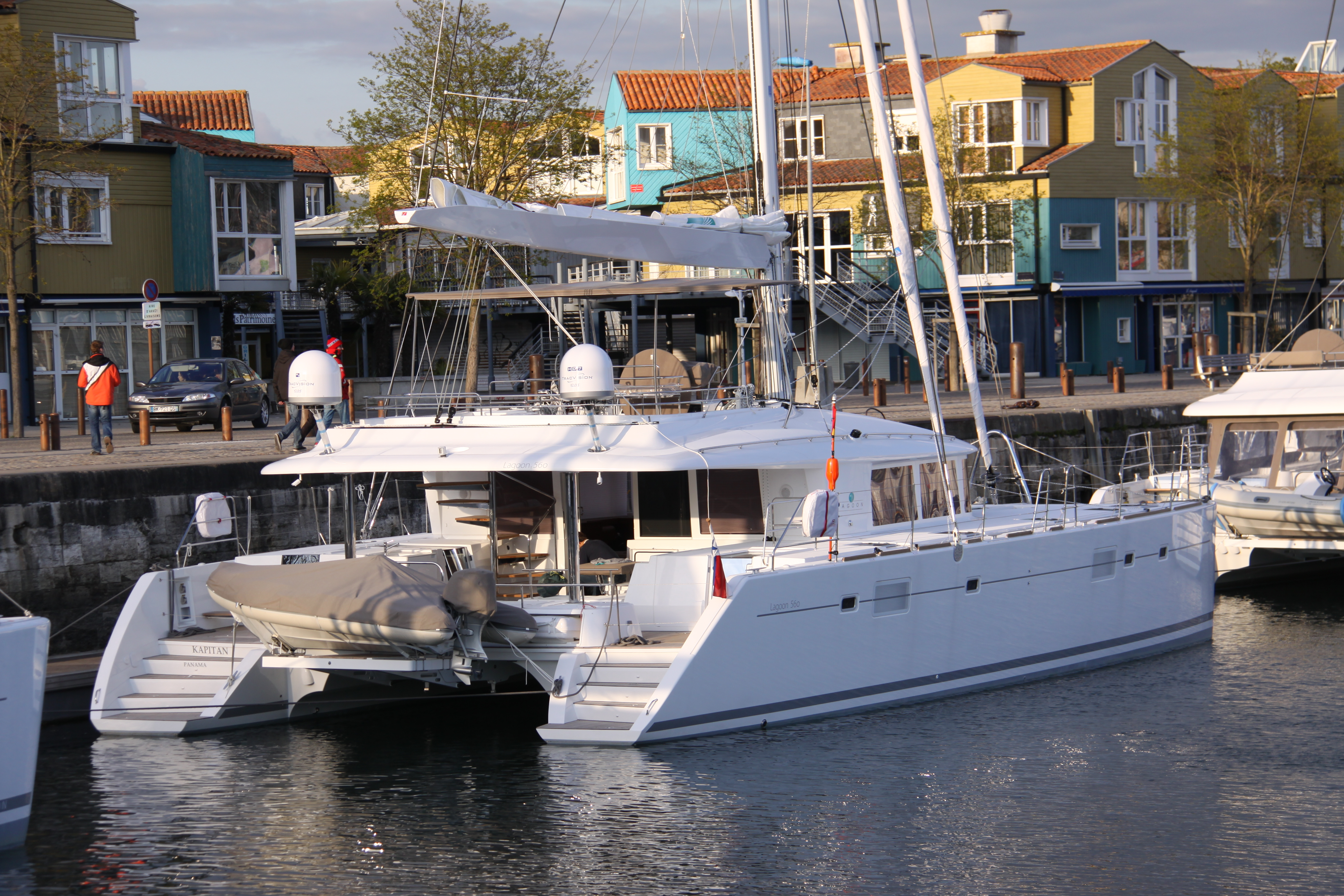
Cruising catamaran in 2012

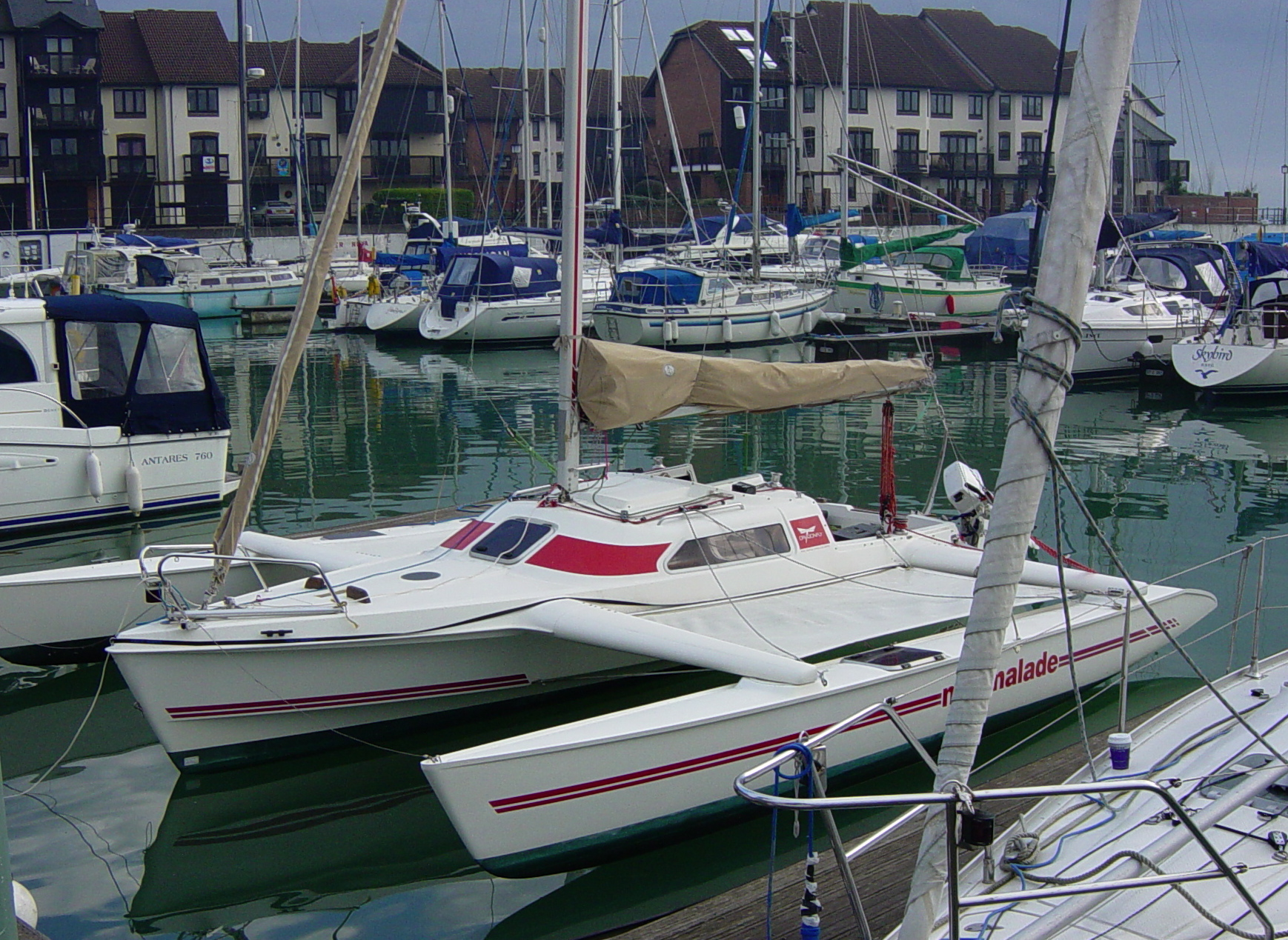
Cruising trimaran with folding amas in 2005

Design considerations for a cruising yacht include seaworthiness, performance, sea kindliness, and cost of construction, as follows:

- Seaworthiness addresses the integrity of the vessel and its ability to stay afloat and shelter its crew in the conditions encountered. Watertightness of connections, ports and hatches are key to staying afloat. Stability—the ability to return to an upright condition when upset by waves is also important.
- Performance hinges on a number of factors, including the waterline length (longer means faster), drag in the water (narrower hull with smooth appendages), hull shape, and sail shape and area.
- Sea kindliness is an indicator of steering ease, directional stability and quelling of motion induced by wind and waves.

The displacement of a monohull cruising sailboat affects the above factors, as follows:

- Heavy displacement yachts with a displacement to length ratio (D/L) of 400+ have a long, deep keel and a protected propeller. They are stable, often roomy, are resistant to harm from groundings and floating obstacles, and have good sea kindliness, but lack speed.
- Medium displacement yachts with a D/L of about 300 typically have a separate keel and blended rudder support, which improves speed and maneuverability over the heavy displacement designs.
- Light displacement yachts with a D/L of about 200 typically have a fin keel and a spade rudder with a ballasted bulb. They have good speed, maneuverability, and ability to point into the wind. Their sea kindliness is less than the heavy and medium-displacement categories.

Multihulls offer tradeoffs as cruising sailboats, compared with monohulls. They may be catamarans or trimarans. They rely on form stability—having separate hulls far apart—for their resistance to capsize. Their advantages include greater: stability, speed, (for catamarans) living space, and shallower draft. Their drawbacks include: greater expenses, greater windage, more difficult tacking under sail, less load capacity, and more maneuvering room required because of their broad beam. They come with a variety of sleeping accommodations and (for catamarans) bridge-deck configurations.

=== Construction ===
Traditionally, all sailing yachts were made of wood, using a wooden keel and ribs, clad with planks. These materials were supplanted with metal in specialty racing yachts. In the 1960s fiberglass became a prevalent material. These materials and other composites continue in use.

- Wood construction, using conventional planks over ribs continues. Hard-chined boats made with plywood is an infrequent technique. Whereas yachts made with the WEST system—plies of wood strips, soaked in epoxy and applied over the boat frame—provide a durable, lightweight and robust hull.
- Metal hulls from steel or aluminum offer the opportunity for welding components to a completely watertight hull. Both metals are vulnerable to damage due to electrolysis. Steel is easy to repair in boatyards around the world, whereas aluminum is a much lighter material.
- Fiberglass construction is best suited for mass-produced yachts, using a mold and is therefore the most prevalent material. Fiberglass skins comprise plies of roving (glass fabric) and matting, soaked in resin for the hull. Decks typically have a core of balsa or PVC foam between layers of glass mat. Both elements of construction are vulnerable to intrusion of water and the development of blisters.

=== Rigs ===
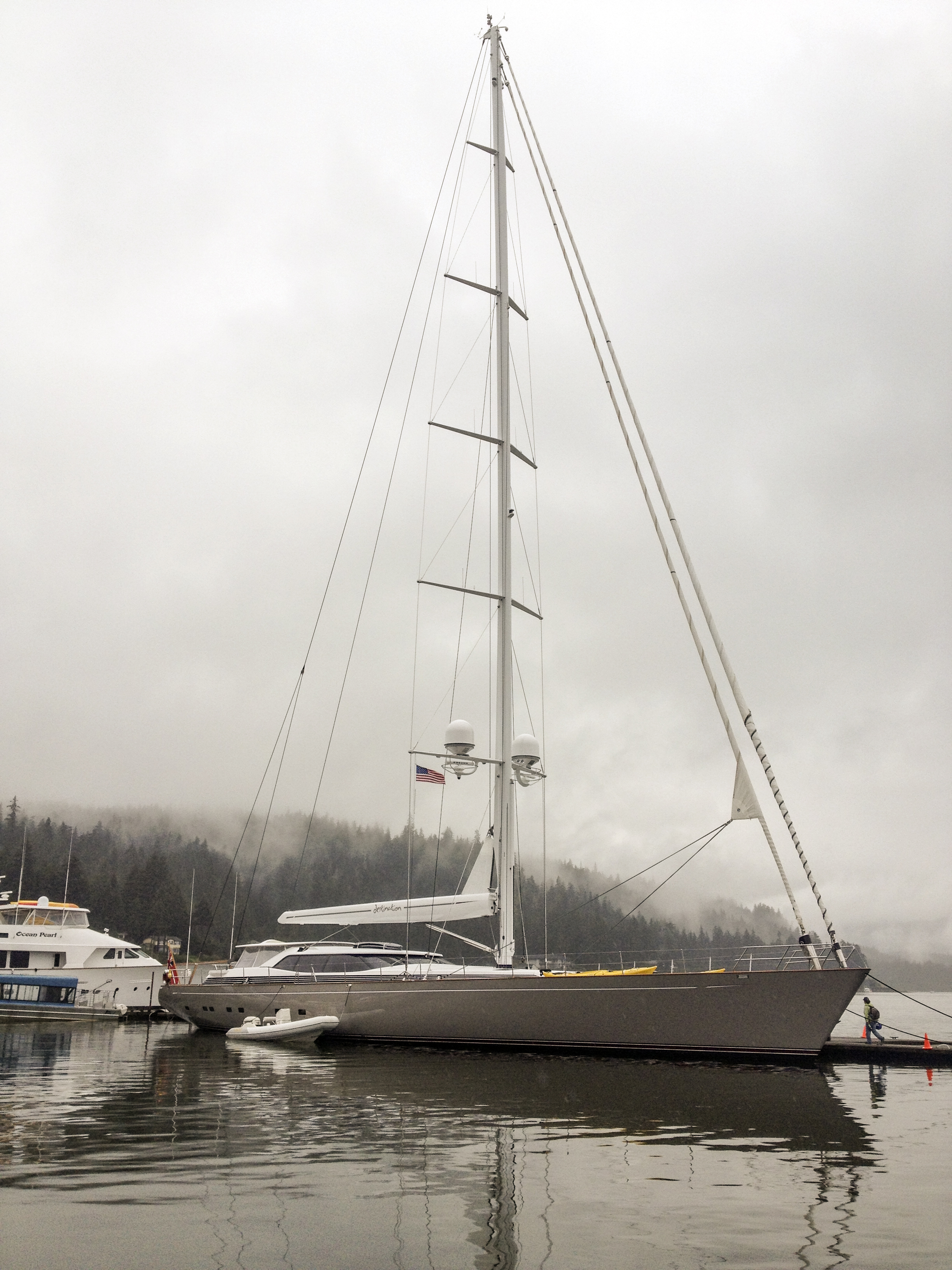
Cruising yacht, Destination, with roller furled jibs and mainsail in 2014

Gaff rigs have been uncommon in the construction of cruising boats, since the mid 20th century. More common rigs are Bermuda, fractional, cutter, and ketch. Occasionally employed rigs since then have been the yawl, schooner, wishbone, catboat. A survey of cruising sailors identified preferences for sloops, cutters, and ketches in equal measure.

Most cruising yachts have masts of aluminum, which may be stepped (mounted) on the top of the keel inside the boat or on the top of the cabin, outside. A keel-stepped mast is better able to withstand a failure of its supporting standing rigging, but requires a penetration of the cabin roof and the need for waterproofing. Masts have a variety of possible tracks for the mainsail to be attached and raised. Some allow for in-mast furling of the mainsail at the expense of aerodynamic efficiency of the mast and sail. Some booms allow for roller furling of mainsails.

=== Gear ===
Sailboats employ standing rigging to support the rig, running rigging to raise and adjust sails, cleats to secure lines, winches to work the sheets, and more than one anchor to secure the boat in harbor. A cruising yacht's deck usually has safety line to protect the crew from falling overboard and a bow pulpit to facilitate handling the jib and the anchor. In temperate climates, the cockpit may have a canvas windshield with see-through panels, called a "dodger". Steering may be either by tiller or wheel.

=== Accommodations ===
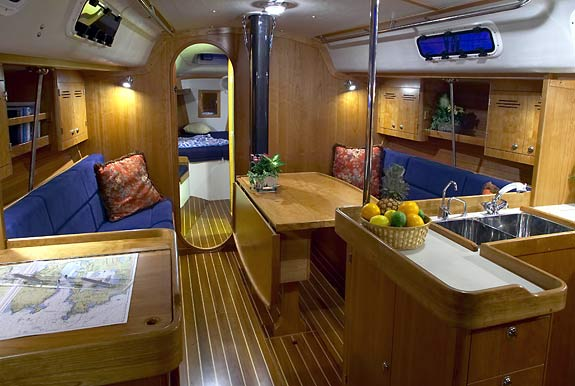
Cruising yacht interior with fold-down table in main salon, galley (kitchen) on right, and navigation station on left and forward cabin visible beyond.

Depending on size, a cruising yacht is likely to have at least two cabins, a main salon and a forward stateroom. In smaller yachts, the salon is likely to have convertible berths for its crew or passengers. Typically the salon includes a dining area, which may have a folding, built-in table. The salon is typically contiguous to the galley. A cruising yacht is likely to have a head (bathroom) with a marine toilet that discharges waste into a holding tank. Larger yachts may have additional staterooms and heads. There is typically a navigation station that allows the laying out of charts away from other activities within the vessel. The electrical panel and auxiliary instrumentation is often near this location.

=== Engine ===
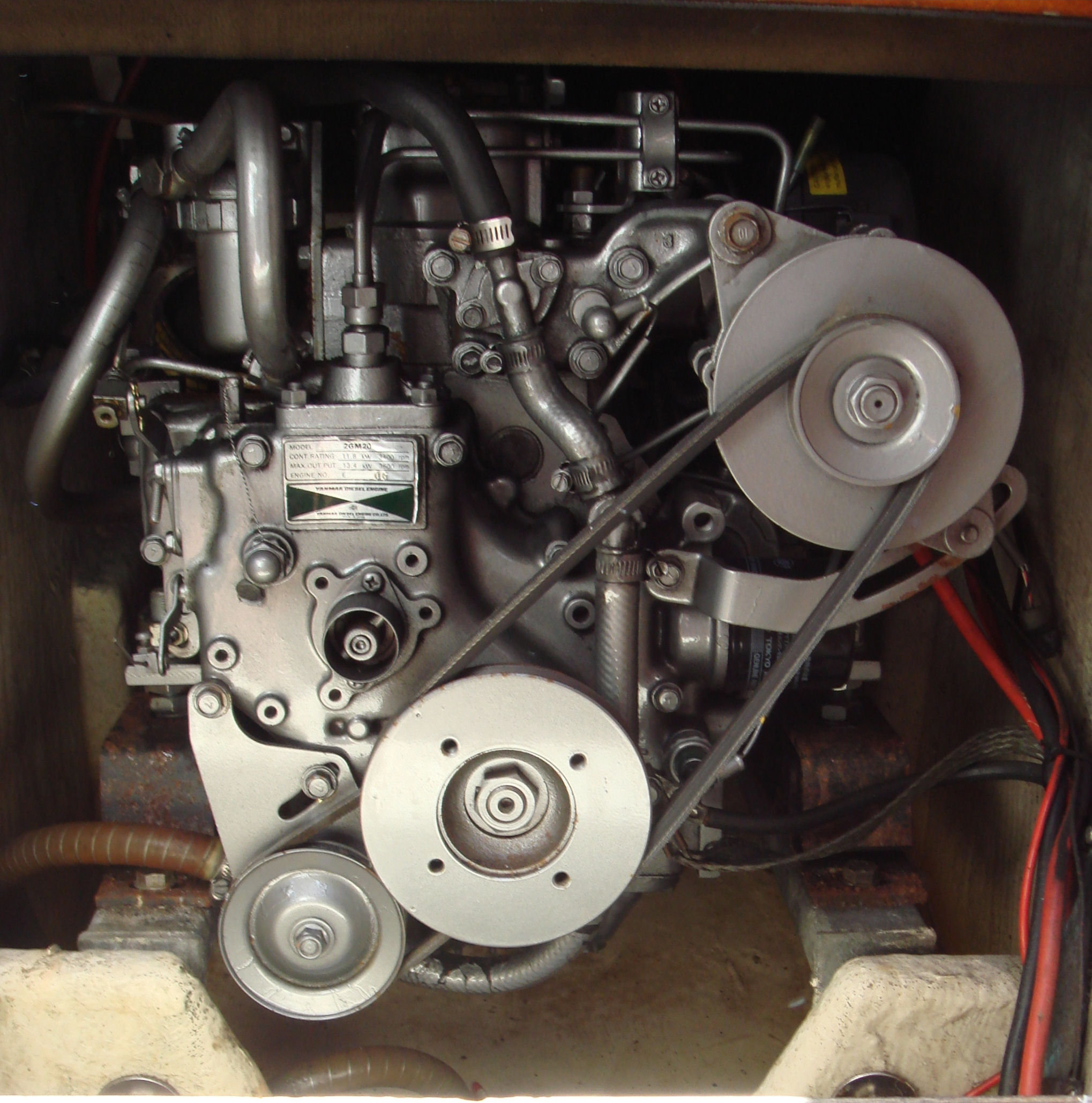
Auxiliary diesel yacht engine

Cruising yachts have an auxiliary propulsion power unit to supplement the use of sails. Such power is inboard on the vessel and diesel, except for the smallest cruising boats, which may have an outboard gasoline motor. Target shaft horsepower for the engine per unit of displacement is related to hull speed per square root of waterline length all to the third power. Choice of engines is also a function of target propeller speed at cruise. A 31-foot (9.4 m) sailboat might have a 13-horsepower (9.7 kW) engine, whereas a 55-foot (17 m) sailboat might have a 110-horsepower (82 kW) engine.

=== Systems ===
Electrical power comes from a bank of batteries that are recharged by the motor, driving an alternator. The plumbing system for house water draws from one or more tanks, which are either filled in port or replenished with a desalination water maker, driven by the engine. Typically water from kitchen and bathroom sinks and showers drains overboard. Toilets typically use salt water and drain into holding tanks, unless they are in use beyond prescribed distances from shore. Refrigeration may be from ice acquired ashore, or by mechanical refrigeration driven directly from the engine or the yacht's electrical system. Yachts have electrical lighting for inside and outside use and also for night-time running.

Modern yachts employ a suite of electronics for communication, measurement of surroundings, and navigation.

- Communications equipment includes radios in a variety of bandwidths, specifically for maritime use. Offshore vessels are likely to be equipped with an automatic identification system that allows other vessels to see their type and origin as part of the information presented on the ship's radar.
- Instrumentation also provides information on depth of water under the vessel (depth sounder), windspeed (anemometer), and directional orientation (compass).
- Navigation electronics include units that identify a vessel's location (e.g. GPS) and display the vessel's location (chartplotter) and other vessels and nearby shore (radar).

=== Styling ===
Hull design can affect the aesthetics of a sailing yacht. The shape of the bow and stern are significant factors, as is a yacht's sheer line (the curvature of its deck). Bow shapes include the bow (convex curve), destroyer or vertical (near vertical), and knuckle or raked (angled straight to the water line). Stern shapes include raked aft or counter (slight outward angle), straight (up and down), reverse angle (sloping downward from the deck). As to sheer, traditional yachts have the deck follow a curve below an imaginary straight line from stem (top of bow) to stern.

== Racing ==
Transatlantic racer, Comanche, in the 2015 Rolex Transatlantic Race

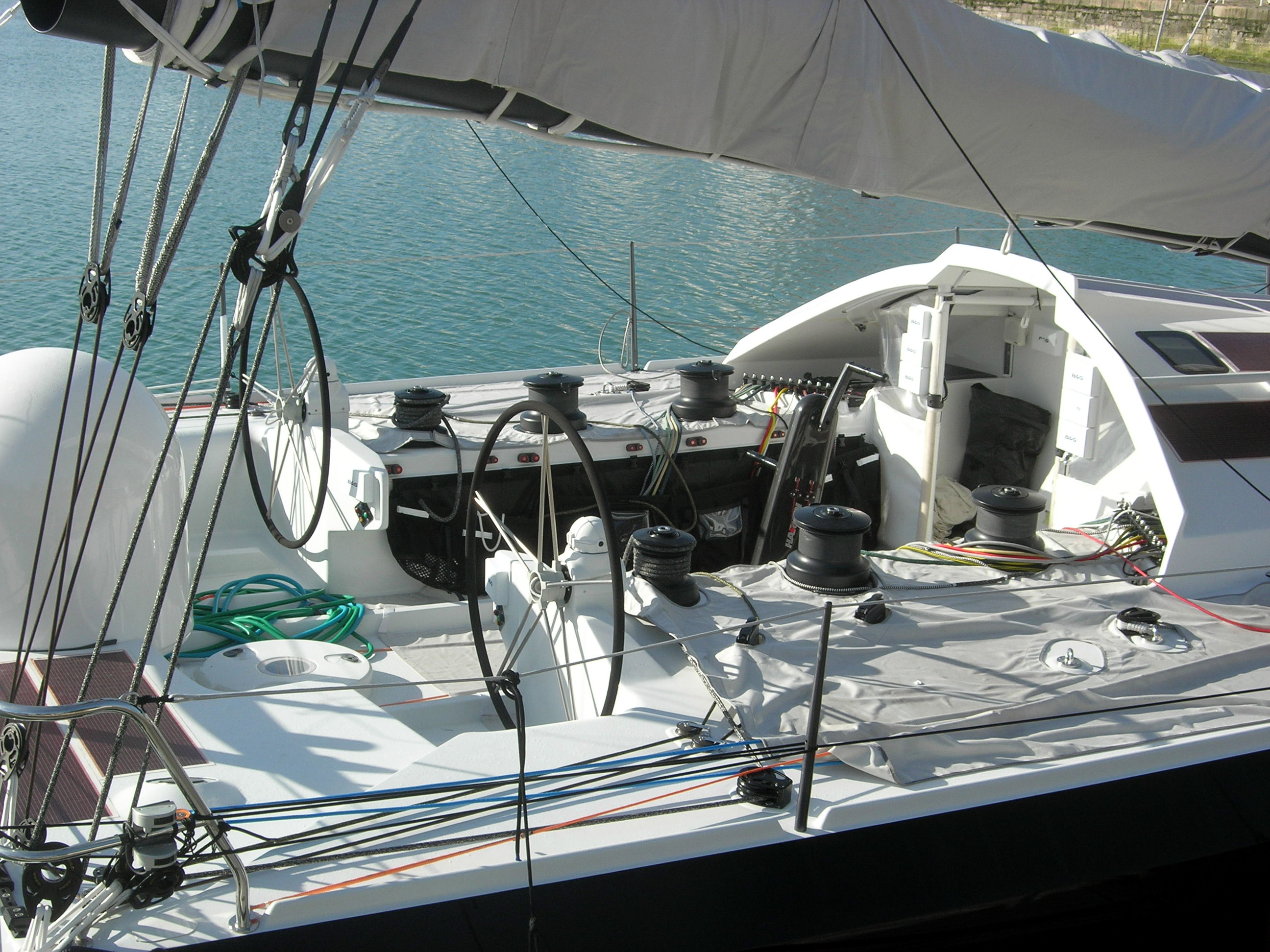
Cockpit of racing yacht, Temenos, in 2006

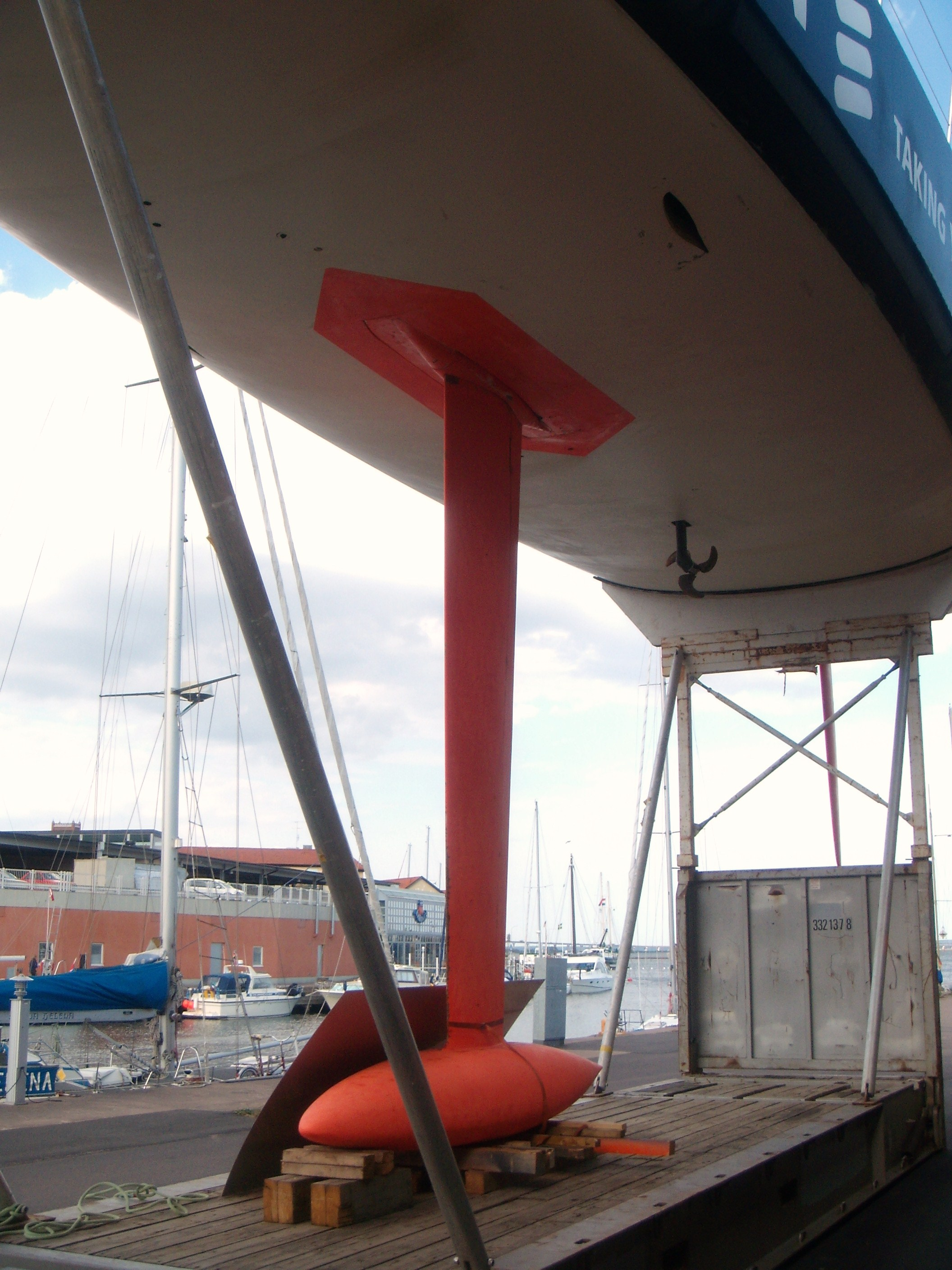
Canting keel on a Volvo Open 70 yacht in 2009

Racing yachts emphasize performance over comfort. High-performance rigs provide aerodynamic efficiency and hydrodynamically efficient hulls minimize drag through the water and sideways drift.

=== Design features ===
Racing yachts have a wide selection of weights and shapes of sail to accommodate different wind strengths and points of sail. A suite of sails on a racing yachts would include several weights of jib and spinnaker, plus a specialized storm jib and trysail (in place of the mainsail). Performance yachts are likely to have full-battened kevlar or carbon-fiber mainsails.

Underwater foils can become more specialized, starting with a higher-aspect ratio fin keel with hydrodynamically efficient bulbs for ballast. On some racing yachts, a canting keel shifts angle from side to side to promote sailing with less heeling angle (sideways tilt), while other underwater foils mitigate leeway (sideways motion).

=== Classes ===
World Sailing recognizes eleven classes of racing yacht:

| Class | LOA | Manufacturer |
|---|---|---|
| Farr 30 | 30.9 feet (9.4 m) | Open |
| X-35 | 34.0 feet (10.36 m) | X-Yachts |
| J/111 | 36.4 feet (11.1 m) | J/Boats |
| Class 40 | 39 feet (11.9 m) | Open |
| Soto 40 | 40 feet (12.3 m) | M Boats |
| X-41 | 40.5 feet (12.3 m) | X-Yachts |
| Swan 45 | 45.4 feet (13.83 m) | Nautor |
| Transpac 52 | 52.0 feet (15.85 m) | Open |
| IMOCA 60 | 60 feet (18 m) | Open |
| ClubSwan 50 | 50.0 feet (15.24 m) | Nautor |
| Maxi yacht | 70 feet (21 m)+ | Open |

== See also ==
- Cruising (maritime)
- List of sailboat designers and manufacturers
- Sailing (sport)
- Yachting
- Yacht racing
