= Capsized: Blood in the Water =

2019 American television film

- Official release poster
- Screenplay by: Stephen David
- Story by: Stephen David; Tim K. Kelly; Jonathan Soule
- Directed by: Roel Reiné
- Starring: Josh Duhamel; Tyler Blackburn; Beau Garrett; Rebekah Graf; Josh Close
- Music by: Extreme Music
- Country of origin: United States
- Original language: English

Production
- Producer: Stephen David
- Cinematography: Roel Reiné
- Editors: Derek Ambrosi; Jonathan Soule; Eric Fernandez; Radu Ion; Brian Perez
- Production companies: Stephen David Entertainment; A Shark Week Film; Discovery Channel Films; Pinewood Dominican Republic Studios; Lantica Media; Republic Studios; SAG-AFTRA; Connecticut Office of Film, Television & Digital Media; Dirección General de Cine República Dominicana (DGCINE)

Original release
- Network: Discovery Channel
- Release: July 31, 2019

Capsized: Blood in the Water is an American biographical natural horror-survival film, based on a true story from 1982. Roel Reiné directed the film, from a script written by Stephen David, with the story co-written by David, Tim K. Kelly and Jonathan Soule. The film plot centers around a small boat crew aboard a private yacht who are stranded in shark infested waters, following a storm that overturns their vessel. Debuting as the first scripted Discovery's Shark Week feature film, Capsized: Blood in the Water was released on July 31, 2019 as an exclusive to the network's week-long yearly event.

The movie was met with mixed reviews praising its realism and special effects, while criticizing its changes to the true story. Some critics questioned Discovery Channel's addition of the film to their schedule, due to the program's usual stance on disproving sharks as monsters of the ocean.

== Premise ==
Based on a true story; in October 1982, the Trashman yacht sailing in a routine transfer from Maine to Florida, is capsized following an unexpected storm. The crew is left adrift in open water for days in the cold, shark-infested waters. The group realizes that they must do everything they can to survive exhaustion, dehydration, insanity and the sharks below.

One of the survivors, Deborah Scaling Kiley, published a book about the shipwreck titled Albatross: The True Story of a Woman's Survival at Sea (1994) which was made into a TV movie Two Came Back (1997). She was profiled in the episode "Shark Survivor" on the Discovery channel series I Shouldn't Be Alive (Ep. 1, Season 1).

== Cast ==
- Tyler Blackburn as Brad Cavanaugh
- Beau Garrett as Deborah "Deb" Scaling-Kiley
- Josh Close as Mark Adams
- Rebekah Graf as Meg Mooney
- Josh Duhamel as Capt. John Lippoth

Additionally, Virginia Del Sol, Mike Marunde, and Ruairi Rhodes feature as Kate, Brad's father, and Sully, respectively. David H. Stevens, and Roque Nunez also appear in the film.

== Production ==
=== Development ===
Following the summer staple's 30th anniversary, "there was a lot of discussion around, 'How do we build on this success?'" says Howard Swartz, Discovery's senior vice president of production and development. "So we decided to try something out of the box." In 2019, Discovery Channel announced the schedule for the 31st season of Shark Week. Among its release was the first scripted Shark Week Film, Capsized: Blood in the Water. During the press-release the network stated that basing the film on a true story, was congruent with the program's educational nature. Staying true to the historical events, featuring tiger sharks (an oceanic predator with a reputation for eating anything), and with the statistical average number of six fatal shark attacks per year - the network studio stated it would refrain from "demonizing sharks".

Discovery's Vice President of Production and Development, Howard Swartz, stated that following the years of success for the annual summer event, "there was a lot of discussion around, 'How do we build on this success?' ... So we decided to try something out of the box." The film was released as A Shark Week Film, the first of its kind.

=== Filming ===
Production took place in the Dominican Republic, at the Pinewood Studios location on the islands.

Much of the photography took place with the cast treading water in a 2.4 million gallon tank. Crew members reportedly worked for hours in the scorching heat, upon metal catwalks constructed over the large tank. The tank was filled with chest-high water, where the actors dramatized the film's events. Sharks were added to the scenes during post-production, through use of CGI special effects.

=== Music ===
The score for the film was provided by Extreme Music. The company is used in various mediums, to creates music using multi-award-winning A-list talent. Extreme Music is a music production subsidiary of Sony Entertainment, Inc. and has provided music libraries for film and television since 1997.

== Release ==
=== Premiere ===
The movie debuted exclusively through Discovery network, during their Shark Week event, as Episode 10 of the 2019 Season. It was released on Wednesday at 9 p.m. ET, following the documentary-style show Extinct or Alive: The Lost Shark. Viewers without access to television, were able to view Capsized via live stream on the network's website, or on the Discovery Go app with a cable provider login needed to view the stream. Audience with a Hulu account, can similarly stream the movie through that medium. A live stream of Shark Week programs can also be accessed through YouTube TV, Amazon Prime Video or Vudu.

== Reception ==
Overall, the movie was well received by critics for its realistic portrayal of survival. As intended by Discovery, they also noted the educational value for the film. Special effects and use of real shark footage was noted, while differences from the true story were pointed out. Other reviews noted the effective use of tension, and suspenseful thriller aspects. Some reviews acknowledged the network's intention to keep from depicting sharks as villainous, as effective; even noting that actors within the film were successfully scared by the artificial sharks used during the attack scenes.

== See also ==
- Shark Week
  - Blood in the Water
  - Ocean of Fear
  - Megalodon: The Monster Shark Lives
