= Two Came Back =

1997 television film by Dick Lowry

- Based on: Albatross by Deborah Scaling-Kiley
- Screenplay by: Raymond Hartung
- Directed by: Dick Lowry
- Starring: Melissa Joan Hart; Jonathan Brandis; Jon Maynard Pennell; Susan Sullivan
- Music by: Michael Tavera
- Country of origin: United States
- Original language: English

Production
- Running time: 90 minutes

Original release
- Network: ABC
- Release: September 28, 1997

Two Came Back is a 1997 American television film based on the true story of Deborah Scaling Kiley as told in her book Albatross (1994). Melissa Joan Hart stars alongside Jonathan Brandis. The film premiered on ABC on September 28, 1997.

== Plot ==
Susan Clarkson (Melissa Joan Hart) agrees to go with Jason (Jonathan Brandis) and three other young crew members and deliver a 60-foot sailing yacht from San Diego to Vancouver to a potential buyer. However the over-anxious captain sails off course and the crew runs into some bad weather. While out at sea, the yacht sinks, leaving the crew to fend for themselves against the merciless elements. All trapped on the yacht's dinghy, they find themselves without food, water or supplies and with sharks posing a constant threat to their survival.

== Cast ==
- Melissa Joan Hart as Susan Clarkson
- Jonathan Brandis as Jason
- David Gail as Matt
- Susan Sullivan as Patricia Clarkson
- Jon Pennell as Rick
- Susan Walters as Allie
- Steven Ford as Lieutenant Belwick
- James D. Fields as Susan's teammate
- Elliot Woods as Coast Guardsman
- Tracy Villar as Coast Guardswoman

== See also ==
- Capsized: Blood in the Water, film based on same events
