= Ocean of Fear =

- DVD cover
- Narrated by: Richard Dreyfuss
- Country of origin: United States
- Original language: English

Production
- Executive producer: Julian P Hobbs
- Running time: 120 minutes

Original release
- Network: Discovery Channel
- Release: July 29, 2007

Ocean of Fear: Worst Shark Attack Ever is a 2007 made-for-television documentary film that launched the 20th anniversary of the Discovery Channel's Shark Week of 2007. It recounts the sinking of the USS Indianapolis. The show initially aired on July 29, 2007, on the eve of the anniversary of the ship’s sinking in 1945.

The show investigated the shark attacks that occurred when the USS Indianapolis sank. Hundreds of crew that survived were stranded in the water for four days before rescue. In that time many of the survivors endured constant shark attacks. The Discovery Channel hired George H. Burgess, a renowned investigator in shark attacks, to determine, "why the sharks attacked the way they did," and to "investigate the survival strategies of the men in the water, including those who fought the sharks."

== Cast and crew ==
The cast and crew of Ocean of Fear included these people:

- Richard Bedser, Director
- Peter Miller, Editor
- Malcolm Mclean, Director of Photography
- Charlotte Wheaton, Line Producer
- Richard Dreyfuss, Narrator. Dreyfuss starred in the film Jaws as Matt Hooper.
- Antony Edridge, Captain Charles Butler McVay III
- Simon Lee Phillips, Marine Giles McCoy
- Ryan McCluskey, Ensign Harlan Twible
- Philip Rosch, Dr Lewis Haynes
- Chris Mack, Cozell Smith
- Greg Wohead, Joseph Dronet
- Tim Beckmann, Woody James
- Philip Bulcock, Jim Newhall
- Robert Gill, Father Conway
- Ian Colquhoun, A Scottish actor who played the part of a wounded sailor.
- David Smallbone, Harry
- John Warman, Interviewer / Investigator

== Historical basis ==
Ocean of Fear is centered on the sinking of the USS Indianapolis, which had been torpedoed by Japanese submarine I-58 on July 30, 1945 in the Philippine Sea. Of the estimated 900 men who survived the attack, only 317 were rescued after four days in shark infested waters. The Discovery Channel describes the event as "the worst shark attack in history." Surviving members of the crew attended a special screening in New York City on 18 July 2007. According to the accounts of the surviving crew, most of the men died of either exhaustion, exposure to the elements, or drinking the ocean water, not from shark attacks. However, this incident is still one of the worst cases of sharks feeding on humans.

== See also ==
- Shark Week
  - Blood in the Water
  - Megalodon: The Monster Shark Lives
  - Capsized: Blood in the Water
