= Megalodon: The Monster Shark Lives =

2013 film

Megalodon: The Monster Shark Lives is a 2013 television film by Doug Glover and written by John McLaughlin presented as a documentary, that aired on the Discovery Channel as part of their Shark Week series, about the potential survival of the prehistoric shark. The story revolves around numerous videos, photographs, and firsthand encounters with a megalodon and an ensuing investigation that points to the involvement of the prehistoric species, despite the long-held belief of its extinction. The film is presented as factual, including accounts from professionals in various fields such as marine biology.

The show, similar to the Animal Planet's pseudo-documentary Mermaids: The Body Found, came under heavy criticism by both scientists and viewers due to the attempt to present something fictional as a documentary. Many of its viewers were offended that a docufiction program aired on Discovery Channel—an American network known for producing otherwise educational and credible scientific programs.

Megalodon: The Monster Shark Lives ranks as the most-watched Shark Week show to date, with 4.8 million viewers. Much of the attention garnered by the film was a result of the backlash, though host Brian Switek said that the film "gave science communicators like me an easy target". The special received a sequel titled Megalodon: The New Evidence. During Shark Week 2018, Discovery aired Megalodon: Fact vs. Fiction, a third special, with actors playing experts that reflect on the original.

== Cast ==
- Darron Meyer as Colin Drake
- Mike Bhana as Mike Bhana
- Katherine Kampko as Jess Okar (as Katherine Crawford)
- Clayton Evertson as Fisherman
- Jeremeo Le Cordeur as Hawaiian Boy
- Juliana Venter as Madelyn Joubert (uncredited)

== Controversy ==
Soon after the film premiered, it was criticized for its presentation of fictional details treated as facts, actors allegedly posing as scientists, and presenting "evidence" that did not exist. Colin Drake was not a marine biologist and actually a hired actor named Darron Meyer. Discovery Channel added brief disclaimers at the beginning and end, indicating the program is fictional, as a result.

After the show was released, Discovery Channel gave a poll to its viewers asking whether or not they believed in the Megalodon's survival.

== See also ==
- Shark Week
  - Ocean of Fear
  - Blood in the Water
  - Capsized: Blood in the Water
- The Last Dragon, a similar program airing on Animal Planet that attempted to describe dragons in a scientific manner.
- List of television shows notable for negative reception
