= X35 =

X35 may refer to:

- X-35 (yacht)
- Dunnellon/Marion County Airport, Florida
- Lockheed Martin X-35, an American experimental aircraft
- Senova X35, a crossover SUV
