= Deborah Scaling Kiley =

American sailor (1958–2012)

- Born: January 21, 1958; Throckmorton, Texas, U.S.
- Died: August 13, 2012 (aged 54); San Miguel de Allende, Mexico
- Occupations: Sailor; author
- Spouse(s): John Coleman Kiley III (m. 19?? div. ??} Greg Blackmon (m. 2005; div. 2008)
- Children: 2

Deborah Scaling Kiley (January 21, 1958 – August 13, 2012) was an American sailor, author, motivational speaker, and businesswoman. She was the first American woman to complete the Whitbread Round the World Race. In 1982, she famously survived a boating accident off the coast of North Carolina, which became the basis for her book Albatross and the subject of multiple other books and films which emphasized traits and skills of survival. She died of unknown causes after moving to Mexico in 2012.

== Biography ==
Deborah Scaling was born January 21, 1958, in Throckmorton, Texas. She took up sailing at an early age and began working as a crew member on yachts. In 1981, she became the first American woman to complete the Whitbread Round the World Race, working as a cook on the South African Xargo.

In October 1982, she was hired to crew a 58-foot (18-meter) sailing yacht called the Trashman for a routine Maine to Florida transfer. From Maine, they stopped over in Annapolis, Maryland, and had left for the next leg when the boat was overtaken by unexpected heavy weather in the Gulf Stream off the coast of North Carolina. The Trashman foundered in 40–50-foot (12–15-meter) seas and sank while the five crew members gathered on an 11-foot (3.4-meter) Zodiac life raft. Over the next several days, three crew members would die. Two – Mark Adams and John Lippoth – drank seawater, became delusional, left the raft, and were eaten by sharks. The third, Meg Mooney, who was John's girlfriend, died from infected wounds she suffered during the sinking, and was subsequently buried at sea. Five days after the sinking, Scaling and the only other surviving crew member, Brad Cavanagh, were rescued by a passing Soviet cargo ship Olenegorsk, and presented to US authorities.

The shipwreck was transformative for Scaling who went on to write a popular account of the incident called Albatross: The True Story of a Woman's Survival at Sea (1994) which was made into a TV film, Two Came Back; and profiled in the episode "Shark Survivor" on the Discovery channel series I Shouldn't Be Alive (Ep. 1, Se. 1, 2005-08-10); and in the episode "Danielle/Deborah/Gordy & Betty" of the series I Survived... (Ep. 17, Se. 3, 2010-09-12).

She became a motivational speaker, appeared on Larry King Live (CNN) in 2006, and published another book, No Victims Only Survivors (2006), about lessons for surviving. In 2019, Discovery Channel released a made-for-TV movie lightly based on the events of the shipwreck titled Capsized: Blood in the Water.

== Personal life ==
Scaling was married to John Coleman Kiley III, and later to Greg Blackmon from 2005–2008. Both marriages concluded in divorces and in the case of Blackmon, there were charges of domestic violence. She had two children: a daughter, Marka Kiley, and a son, John "Quatro" Kiley IV, who died in a drowning accident on August 23, 2009.

Scaling Kiley died of an undisclosed cause on August 13, 2012, in San Miguel de Allende, Mexico, where she had recently moved.

== See also ==
- List of solved missing person cases: 1950–1999

== Works ==
- Albatross: The True Story of a Woman's Survival at Sea (1994)
- No Victims Only Survivors: Ten Lessons for Survival (2006)

Further reading

- Laurence Gonzales, Deep Survival: Who Lives, Who Dies, and Why, Chapter 11 "We're All Going To Fucking Die!", W. W. Norton & Company, 2004
