= Sharkrunners =

Sharkrunners season 1 was a game created by area/code for the Discovery Channel as part of the channel's 20th year of Shark Week. The game used satellite tracking of six great white sharks off the coast of California. Users were able to take control of research vessels to gather, in real-time, information on the sharks, while trying to earn funding. Players could rename the sharks. At ports, players could use four main services: buying gas, boat upgrades, equipment, and hiring crew. There were four boats in the game. Each could have an engine refit (increases both cruising and top speed by 10%) and upgraded fuel tanks (increases fuel capacity by 20%).

Sharkrunners season 2 used satellite tracking of ten tiger sharks and ten grey reef sharks off the northern coast of Queensland, Australia.

Sharkrunners was removed from Discovery Channel online in July 2011.

== Institutions ==
When creating a character, the player is given the choice of three institutions to join:

- The International Marine Observation Project (I.M.O.P.): a high-tech research institute run by no-nonsense marine scientists looking for hard data
- The Piermont Group: a media-savvy philanthropic organization that is interested equally in scientific data and dramatic images
- Friends of the Ichtheological Nation (FIN): a hard-core ecological activist group devoted to protecting and preserving sharks at any cost
