= Rebekah Graf =

American actress

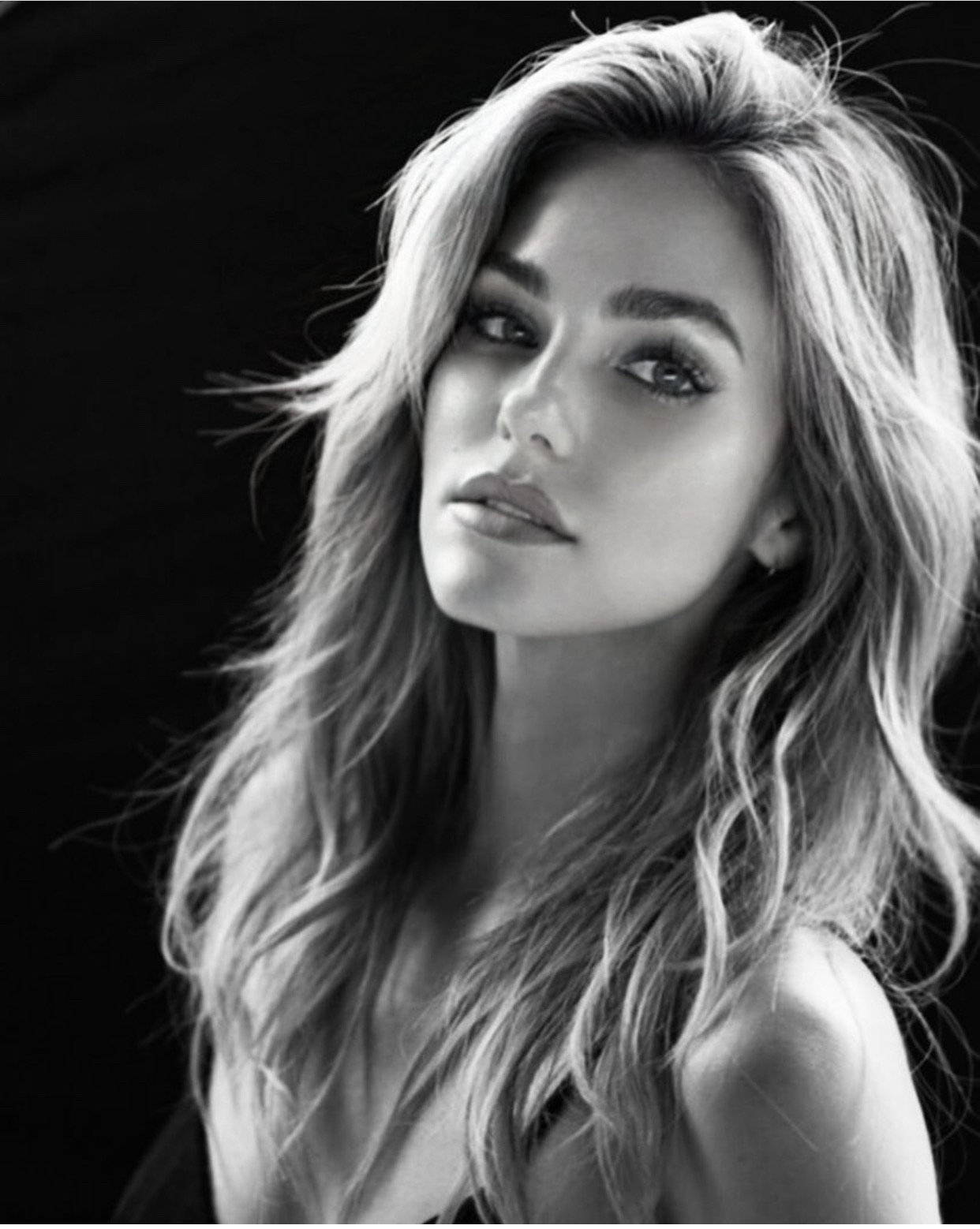
- Born: Corpus Christi, Texas
- Education: University of Texas at Austin
- Occupation: Actor
- Years active: 2008–present

Rebekah Graf is an American film and television actress. She is best known for playing Heather Locklear in the 2019 biographical film The Dirt.

== Family and early life ==
Graf was born and raised in Corpus Christi, Texas. From an early age she aspired to be an actress, and began performing in local theater at the age of five or six years old, a goal fostered by her parents. Graf attended Ray High School and the University of Texas at Austin where she majored in theater arts.

== Career ==
Graf relocated from Austin to Los Angeles and began auditioning for TV and film parts. Early roles included small parts in TV series 90210 and the Comedy Central series Workaholics. She also acted in the films Savage County; the 2015 continuation film of the series Entourage; and The Amityville Murders, the true story of the mass murder antecedent to the alleged supernatural events of The Amityville Horror.

In 2018, Graf was cast in the Netflix biographical film The Dirt, as 80s TV star Heather Locklear, then-wife of Mötley Crüe drummer Tommy Lee. The Dirt received mixed reviews from the critics but was one of the top audience-rated films of 2019 on Rotten Tomatoes. Graf's subsequent roles have included a lead in the film Capsized: Blood in the Water, a survival film based on the true story of a yacht crew stranded in shark-infested waters; and a guest role on the Netflix comedy series The Kominsky Method.

In 2021, Graf was cast in The CW series Walker starring Jared Padalecki, a reboot of the 1993–2001 television series Walker, Texas Ranger, as Crystal. She had been cast in a recurring role as Tara Locke, the mother of Kyle Abbott's (Michael Mealor) son on the CBS soap opera The Young and the Restless, but had to be replaced due to a resulting scheduling conflict with Walker's shooting.

== Personal life ==
In 2019, the tabloid press linked Graf with the actor Josh Duhamel.
