= X-99 =

Type of boat

- Class symbol

Boat
- Crew: 6
- Draft: 1.75 m (5.7 ft)

Hull
- Hull weight: 2,980 kg (6,570 lb), Ballast 1,300 kg (2,900 lb)
- LOA: 10 m (33 ft)
- LWL: 8.5 m (28 ft)
- Beam: 3 m (9.8 ft)

Sails
- Mainsail area: 32.3 m^2
- Jib/genoa area: 30 m^2
- Spinnaker area: 78 m^2

The X-99 was designed by Niels Jeppesen and built by X-Yachts and first launched in 1985 with 605 built. Oak frame: Hull no 1 -to 259 and hull no 270, 263 and 267 Steel frame introduced 1990 Hull no 260 and onwards except 270, 263, 267 Alu. framed windows introduced 1991 (MK I) Hull no 288 and onwards except 290 and 310 Volvo engine introduced 1991 (MK I) Hull no 288 and onwards except 290 and 310 MK II introduced 1996 Hull no 500. From there on the MK II was sold with slightly different features as two windows, needle rudder bearing and a different water pass design. The class was recognised by the International Sailing Federation from the late 1997 to November 2010 during this period the class was entitled to an official World Championship.

== Events ==
=== World Championships ===
Event	Gold	Silver	Bronze
1997 Medemblik,	Netherlands; Walter Geurts	Netherlands; Peter van Veen	XAOS (DEN); Rainer Wolff
1998 Travemünde	www.x-99.dk (DEN)	Alice II (DEN)	Next Step (SWE)
1999 Marstrand	Denmark; Flemming Fjord	Denmark; Lars Thiellesen	Sweden; Michael Collberg
2000 Ramsgate	Humbug (DEN); Flemming Fjord	X-treem (NED); Bart van Aken	Sirena (DEN); Peter Buhl
2001 Skoshoved	Team Nescafé (DEN)	Estonia; Peter Šaraškin	Fut-fut-fut-nu-kører-toget (DEN)
2002 Medemblik	Denmark; Flemming Fjord	Estonia; Peter Saraskin	Germany; Frank Zaun
2003 Sandefjord	Denmark; Flemming Fjord	Denmark; Mats Victorin	Denmark; Bolvig; Galskov
2004 Bregenz	Germany; Christian Soyka	Austria; Mads Christensen	Estonia; Peter Saraskin
2005 Gromitz	Denmark; Flemming Fjord	Estonia; Mati Sepp	Denmark; Peter Bolvig
2006 Borgholm	Team Elion (EST); Jaak Jõgi	Alexela (EST); Mati Sepp	Sweden; Fredrik Malmén
2007 Copenhagen	Baltic Bay Laboe (GER); Christian Soyka	Saxad (EST); Mati Sepp	Pilen (DEN); Bo Selko
2008 Medmemblik	Baltic Bay Laboe (GER); Christian Soyka	Team Xive (GER); Martin Christiansen	Niller (DEN); Jens Haldager
2009 Åsgårdstrand	Immac sailing team (GER); Christian Soyka	Frem (DEN); Per Jungersen; Mads Christensen	Team Xive (GER); Martin Christiansen
2010 Langenargen	Salon Bleu (GER); Tino Ellegast	Immac sailing team (GER); Christian Soyka	Niller (DEN); Jens Haldager

=== Gold Cup ===
Event	Gold	Silver	Bronze
2011, Kiel	GER 408; Christian Soyka (GER)	GER 446 Team Xive; Martin Christiansen (GER)	GER 535 Newport Storm; Jan-Hendrik Franzen (GER)
2012, Marstrand	GER 408 IMMAC X Christian Soyka (GER)	GER 446 Team Xive; Martin Christiansen (GER)	DEN 517 Mille; Kim Rasmussen (DEN)
2013, Copenhagen	GER 408 IMMAC X Christian Soyka (GER)	GER 446 Team Xive; Martin Christiansen (GER)	DEN 517 Mille; Kim Rasmussen (DEN)
2014, Warnemünde	GER 446 Team Xive; Martin Christiansen (GER)	GER 408 Grün; Christian Soyka (GER)	GER 108 Fiefdeeler; Christian Schönrock (GER)
