= X-41 (yacht) =

Sailboat designed by X-Yachts Design Team

Development
- Designer: Nils Jeppersen, X-Yachts Design
- Location: Denmark & UK
- Brand: X-Yachts
- Builder: X-Yachts

Boat
- Crew: 7-10
- Displacement: 6,800 kg (15,000 lb)
- Draft: 2.50 m (8.2 ft)

Hull
- LOA: 12.35 m (40.5 ft)
- LWL: 10.69 m (35.1 ft)
- Beam: 3.64 m (11.9 ft)

Hull appendages
- Keel: Bulbed T-Keel
- Ballast: 2,730 kg (6,020 lb)

Sails
- Mainsail area: 54.5 m^{2} (587 sq ft)
- Jib/genoa area: 43.8 m^{2} (471 sq ft)
- Spinnaker area: 147.6 m^{2} (1,589 sq ft)

Racing
- Class association: One Design

The X-41 was designed by X-Yachts Design Team led by Niels Jeppesen and first launched in 2007 to follow on from the X-35. The class is recognised by the International Sailing Federation.

== Events ==
=== World Championships ===
Event	Gold	Silver	Bronze
2009 Scarlino	Sideracordis; Pier Vettor Grimani (ITA)	Lady; Piergiorgio Ravaioni (ITA)	WB Five; Gianclaudio Bassetti (ITA)
2010 Arendal	Technonicol; Mati Sepp (EST)	Nicole 4 Riku Nissila (FIN)	Forte; Jaak Jogi (EST)
2011	Andrea Tedesco (ITA)	Giovanni Arturo di Lorenzo (ITA)	Vincenzo Onorato (ITA)
2012 Helsinki	FIN 19; Aaro Cantell (FIN)	FIN 45; Kenneth Thelen (FIN)	EST 499; Mati Sepp (EST)
2013	ITA 41048; Pier Vettor Grimani (ITA)	ITA 4100; Gian Claudio Bassetti (ITA)	ITA 4149; Maurizio Pavesi (ITA)
2014	Aaro Cantell (FIN)	Mati Sepp (EST)	Gian Claudio Bassetti (ITA)
2016 Hanko (FIN)			
