= X-Yachts =

Danish yacht manufacturer

X-Yachts A/S is a Danish shipyard, located in Haderslev in the southern part of Denmark. The shipyard builds sailboats between 35 and 65 feet.

== History ==
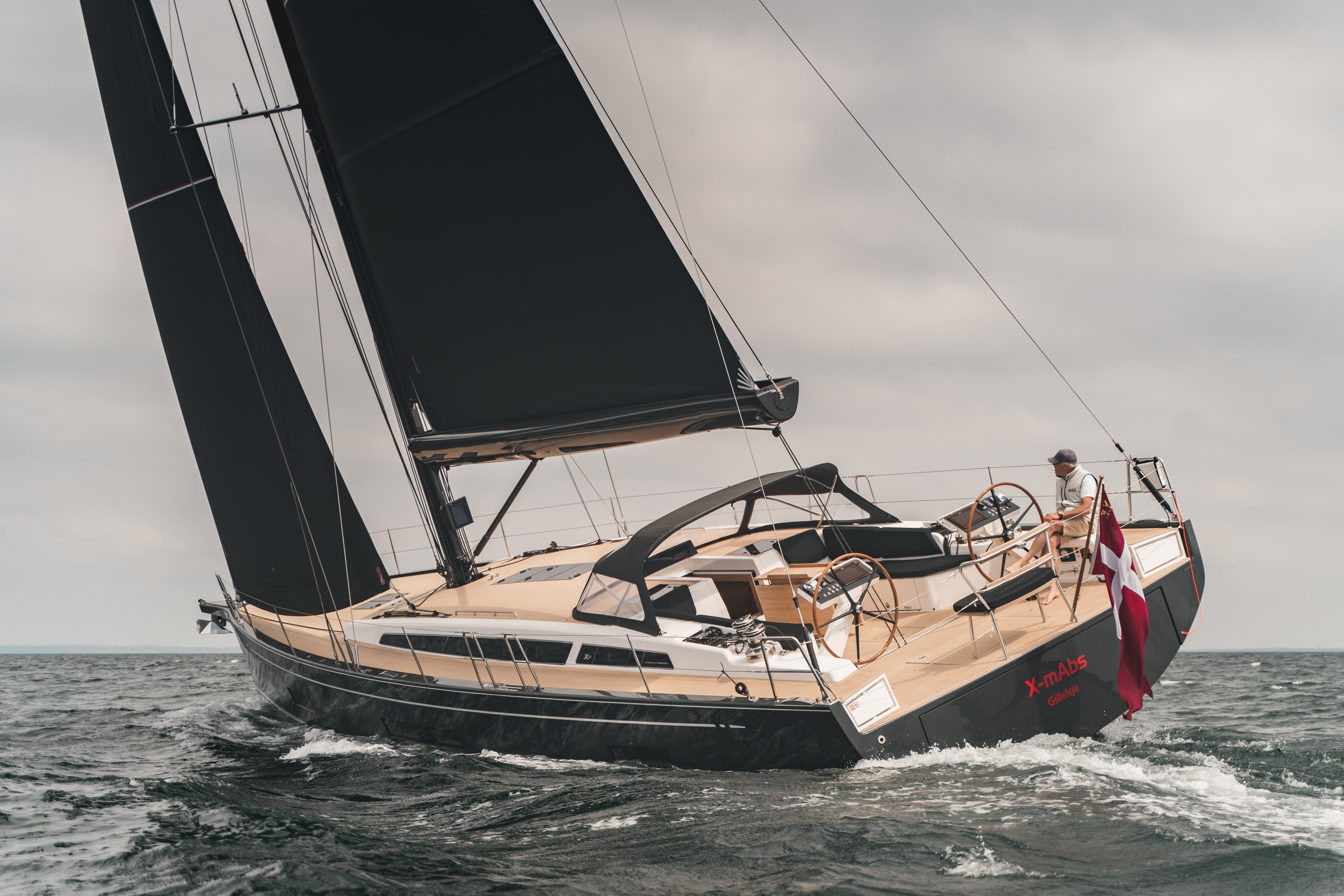
X5.6 in Gilleleje - Photo: Mikkel Groth

The shipyard was founded in 1979 by the brothers Lars Jeppesen, Niels Jeppesen and their friend Birger Hansen. The first boat, the X-79, got its name due to the length of the boat, which was 7.9 m (7.96 m), and because it was launched in the year of 1979. The boat was the Danish answer to J/24, Albin Express, and Maxi 80 Racer and has won many regattas since the first launch. A total of 468 X-79 were built between 1979 and 1994. The yard builds approximately 150 boats per year. The yard has built over 6,000 boats to clients worldwide since 1979.

X-Yachts employs a total of 100 people at the headquarter in Haderslev and has its own moulding production in Poland as well. X-Yachts has a global dealer network consisting of 40 independent dealers. In total X-Yachts employs over 250 people worldwide.

The majority shareholder of X-Yachts and owner since 2012 is Ib Kunøe's holding company Consolidated Holdings, which operates through a number of wholly or partly owned companies. X-Yachts current CEO, since 2018, is Kræn Brinck Nielsen.

== Current Models ==
Although the first boat was designed for regattas, the yard's main area is cruising boats, and today represents three series of sailing boats: XCruising, XPerformance, and latest XRange. In total, these three series represent a fleet of 9 boats from 40 to 56 feet. Furthermore, the yard introduced powerboats in 2021.

XCruising was introduced in 2009. The Xc Series is intended for cruising and ocean navigation. The current Xc series is Xc 47.

The production of the Xc 42 stopped in 2018.

The production of the Xc 35 and Xc 38 stopped in 2021.

The production of the Xc45 and Xc50 stopped in 2024.

XPerformance was introduced in 2011. The Xp Series is the equivalent of the Xc Series, where performance and speed are essential. The current Xp series consists of Xp 44 and Xp 50.

The production of the Xp 33 stopped in 2017.

The production of the Xp 38 and Xp 55 stopped in 2021.

The latest series is the XRange Series, which was introduced in 2016. The XRange Series is a hybrid between the Xc and Xp model, focused on easy sailing and modern lines. In total, the XRange Series consists of 5 models, the X4^{0}, X4^{3}, X4^{6}, X4^{9}, and X5^{6}.

The Powerboat range, which was introduced in January 2021, is consisting of the X-Power 33C. X-Yachts is planning to expand this range with 2 more powerboats the following years.

== Awards (current models) ==
- 2021: X4^{0} - Cruising World, Boat of the Year (Performance Cruiser)
- 2021: X4^{0} - Sail Magazine Best Boats (Performance Cruiser)
- 2020: X4^{6} - Cruising World, Boat of the Year (Best Full Size Cruiser 45 - 55 ft.)
- 2020: X4^{0} - European Yacht of the Year (Performance Cruiser)
- 2019: X4^{9} - Cruising World, Boat of the Year (Best Full-Size Cruiser)
- 2017: X4^{3} - HISWA (Sailing Boat of the Year)
- 2017: X4^{3} - Cruising World, Boat of the Year (Best Full-Sized Cruiser Under 50 ft.)
- 2017: X4^{3} -Adriatic Boat of the Year (Performance Cruiser 42 - 60 ft.)
- 2016: Xc 45 - Cruising World, Boat of the Year (Best Full-Size Cruiser under 50 ft.)
- 2015: Xc 45 - Sailing Today Awards (Performance Cruiser)
- 2014: Xp 44 - Sailing World, Boat of the Year (Midsize Cruisers (41-45 ft.)
- 2013: Xp 50 - Adriatic Boat of the Year (Performance Cruiser 40 - 60 ft.)
- 2009: Xc 45 - European Yacht of the Year (Luxury Cruiser)

Award nominated (current models):

- 2021: X-Power 33C - Best of Boats Award (Best for Fun)
- 2021: X5^{6} - European Yacht of the Year (Luxury Cruiser)
- 2019: X4^{6} - European Yacht of the Year (Performance Cruiser)
- 2017: X4^{3} - European Yacht of the Year (Luxury Cruiser)
- 2015: Xc 45 - Asia Boating Awards (Best Worldwide Production Sailing Yacht under 15 metres)
- 2013: Xp 50 - European Yacht of the Year (Performance Cruiser)

== Former Models ==
Sortable table
| Name | Year Started | Year Ended | No. Built | Hull Length (m) | Notes |
|---|---|---|---|---|---|
| X-79 | 1979 | 1994 | 468 | 7.96 | |
| X-102 | 1981 | 1987 | 173 | 10.02 | |
| X-95 | 1982 | 1988 | 153 | 9.25 | |
| X-402 | 1984 | 1990 | 79 | 12.09 | |
| X-3/4 Ton Mk 1 | 1984 | 1990 | 84 | 9.98 | |
| X-3/4 Ton Mk 2 | 1985 | 1990 | 51 | 10.03 | |
| X-99 OD | 1985 | 2004 | 605 | 9.96 | |
| X-One Ton Mk1 | 1986 | 1986 | 12 | 12.12 | Base on the X-402 Hull |
| X-One Ton Mk2 | 1986 | 1989 | 12 | 12.12 | |
| IOR Two Ton One Off | 1986/12/31 | - | 1 | | "Original Beckmann Stain Remover" first epoxy boat |
| X-452 | 1987 | 1991 | 20 | 13.92 | |
| X-372 | 1987 | 1992 | 120 | 11.28 | |
| X-119 | 1988 | 1992 | 74 | 12.00 | |
| X-342 | 1988 | 1994 | 105 | 10.21 | |
| X-312 | 1989 | 1994 | 64 | 9.24 | |
| 60ft One-Off | 1988 | - | 11 | 18.29 | "Andelsbanken 88" ULDB Racer |
| 50ft IOR One Off | 1989 | - | 1 | 15.23 | "Andelsbanken 89" first pre-preg carbon |
| IOR One Ton One Off | 1989 | - | 1 | 12.12 | "Stockbroker" |
| X-512 | 1990 | 1995 | 17 | 15.57 | |
| 40 ft One Ton | 1990 | 1990 | 1 | 12.12 | "Okyalos IX" |
| X-412 | 1990 | 2003 | 252 | 12.90 | |
| IMX 38 | 1992 | 2000 | 92 | 11.41 | |
| X-362 | 1993 | 2003 | 93 | 10.70 | |
| X-442 | 1993 | 2003 | 127 | 13.51 | |
| X-332 | 1994 | 2005 | 432 | 10.06 | |
| X-302 | 1994 | 2004 | 117 | 9.08 | |
| X-612 | 1995 | 2004 | 12 | 18.29 | |
| X-382 | 1995 | 2003 | 141 | 11.73 | |
| X-482 | 1996 | 2004 | 156 | 14.63 | |
| X-362 Sport | 1998 | 2004 | 156 | 10.70 | |
| X-562 | 1999 | 2004 | 21 | 17.23 | |
| IMX 40 | 2000 | 2004 | 99 | 12.10 | |
| X-73 | 2001 | 2001 | 2 | 22.43 | |
| IMX 45 | 2002 | 2004 | 24 | 13.74 | |
| X-46 | 2003 | 2010 | 75 | 14.01 | |
| X-43 | 2003 | 2010 | 169 | 12.93 | |
| X-50 | 2004 | 2011 | 63 | 15.24 | |
| X-37 | 2004 | 2010 | 148 | 11.35 | |
| X-40 | 2004 | 2010 | 140 | 12.19 | |
| X-35 OD | 2005 | - | - | 10.61 | |
| X-55 | 2005 | 2012 | 34 | 16.76 | |
| IMX 70 | 2005 | 2005 | 1 | 21.40 | Moulding by Green Marine (UK) |
| X-41 OD | 2007 | - | - | 12.35 | |
| X-34 | 2007 | 2013 | 144 | 10.36 | |
| X-65 | 2009 | 2014 | 6 | 20.01 | |
| Xc 42 | 2009 | 2018 | 99 | 12.81 | |
| Xp 33 | 2012 | 2017 | 40 | 9.99 | |
| Xc 38 | 2010 | 2021 | 61 | 11.58 | |
| X-6^{5} | 2016 | 2021 | 3 | 19.18 | |
| Xp 38 | 2011 | 2021 | 83 | 11.58 | |
| Xp 55 | 2013 | 2021 | 13 | 16.76 | |
| Xc 35 | 2014 | 2019 | 30 | 10.36 | |
| X-4^{0} | | Present | N/A | 11.50 | |
| X-4^{3} | | Present | N/A | 12.57 | |
| X-4^{6} | | Present | N/A | 13.50 | |
| X-4^{9} | | Present | N/A | 14.50 | |
| X-5^{6} | | Present | N/A | 16.58 | |
| Xp 44 | | Present | N/A | 13.86 | |
| Xp 50 | | Present | N/A | 14.99 | |
| Xc 45 | | Present | N/A | 13.29 | |
| Xc 50 | | Present | N/A | 14.99 | |
| X-Power 33C | | Present | N/A | 10.2 | |

== Milestone ==
An X-79 won what was then the biggest yacht race in the world, the Sjælland Rundt, with almost 2,100 yachts competing. The X-79 went on to become a one-design class with almost 500 boats built throughout the 190s.

In 1981 the X-102 was designed to race under the Three-Quarter-tonner Rule. X-102s won the Three-Quarter Ton Cup in Finland in 1981 (Soldier Blue) and in 1982, in Spain (Lille Du). A 'Sport' version of the X-102 was called the X-3/4 Ton and won the Three Quarter Ton Cup in 1985 (Sweden), 1987 (Holland), Italy (1988) and Greece (1989).

Throughout the 1980s X-Yachts built many designs to Ton and IOR Rules, also winning the One Ton Cup in 1986 in Spain (Andelsbanken), and in Sweden (Okyalos, 1990).

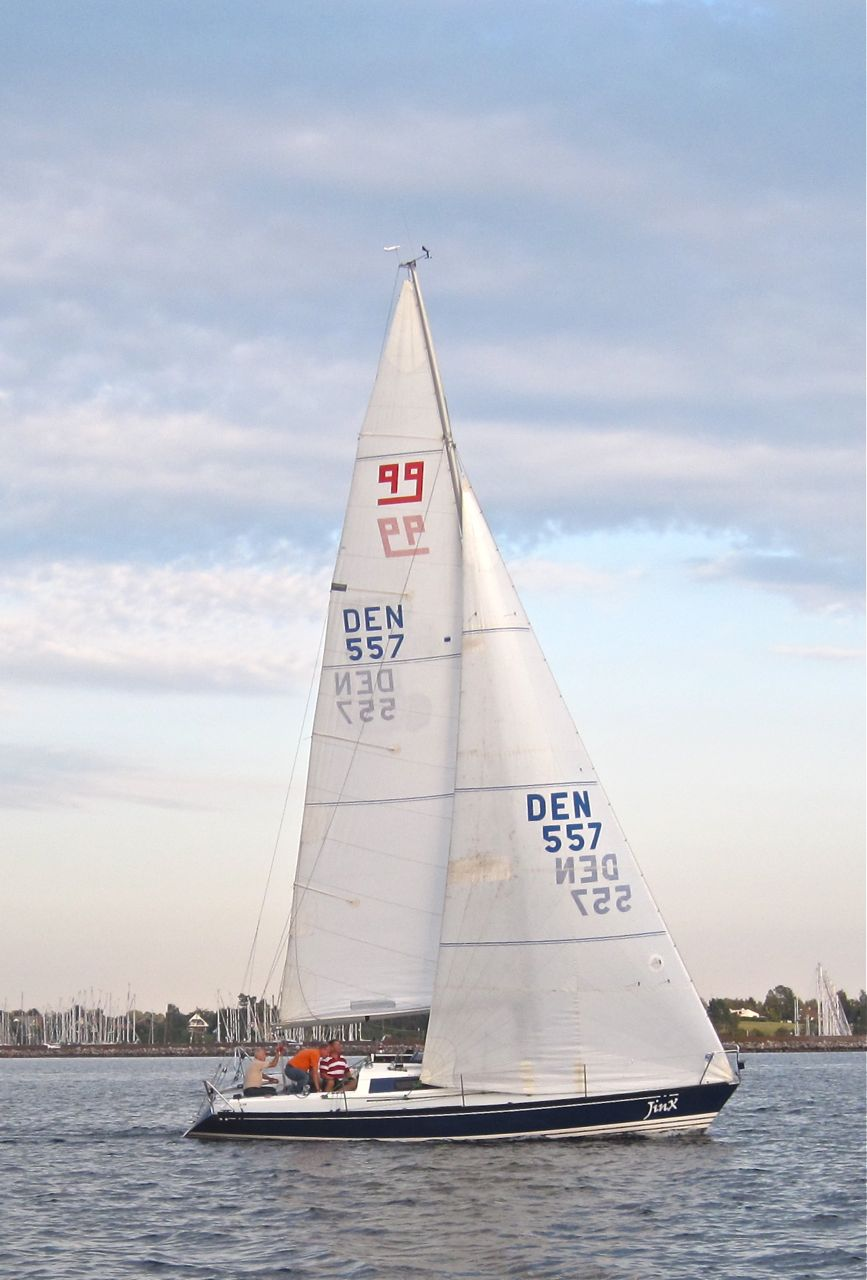
X-99 yacht

In 1985 the X-99 was launched, which became an ISAF-recognized one-design, with 605 boats built.

Seven of the top ten finishers of the 1987 Sjælland Rundt were X-Yachts.

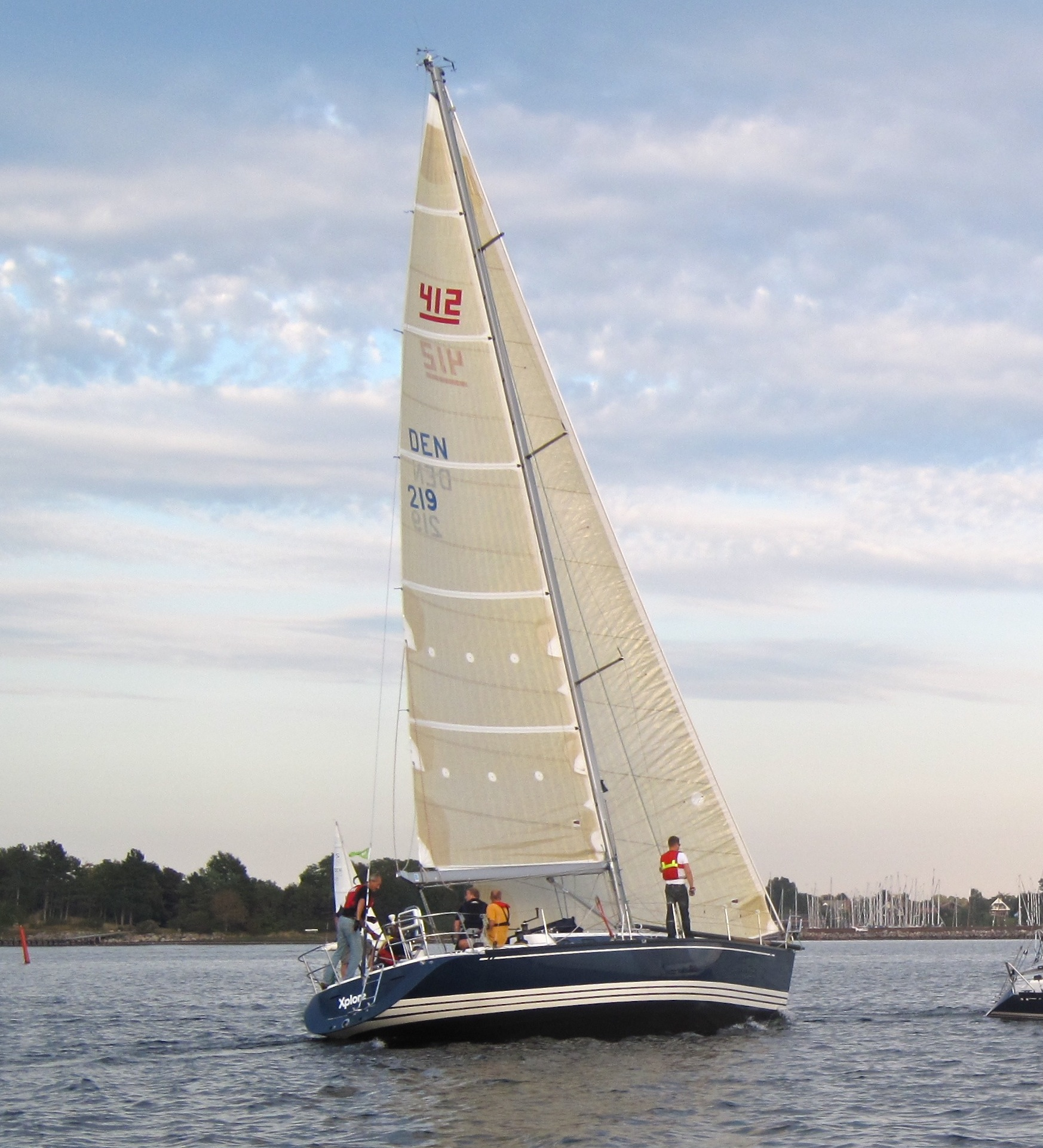
X-412 yacht

In 1990 X-Yachts launched a Performance Cruiser range, beginning with the X-412 and X-382.

In the 1990s the IMS handicap rule became increasingly popular for racing. The IMX 38 was developed and launched in 1993, followed by the IMX 40 and IMX 45 in the early 2000s. IMX designs competed around the world under both IMS and IRC ratings, including winning SORC in the USA in 1995 and 1997, IMS European Championships in 1995, and the Rolex Commodores' Cup in Great Britain in 2002 and 2004.

X-Yachts launched their first one-design racing yacht, the X-35, in 2005, followed by the X-41 one-design in 2007. Both became ISAF-recognized one-design classes.

The IMX 70 was launched in 2005 as a 'one-off', built by Green Marine in the UK and fitted out in Denmark.

In 2007 X-Yachts won a European Yacht of the Year Award with the X-55, a performance cruising design.

In 2009 the first dedicated cruising X-Yacht was launched, the Xc 45, winning its category at the European Yacht of the Year. This was followed by three other Xcruising designs, with the Xc 38 also winning at the European Yacht of the Year awards in 2010.
