= Peter Šaraškin =

Estonian sailor

Personal information
- Nationality: Estonian
- Born: 2 November 1967 (age 58) Tallinn, then part of Estonian SSR, Soviet Union

Sport
- Sport: Sailing

Peter Šaraškin (born 2 November 1967) is an Estonian sailor. He competed at the 1996 Summer Olympics and the 2000 Summer Olympics.
