= Shark Week =

Television program on Discovery Channel

- Shark Week's logo. A fin is carved inside the A.
- Type: Shark-themed programming
- Country: United States
- Network: Discovery Channel

Programming
- Language: English
- Picture format: 1080i HDTV

Ownership
- Owner: Warner Bros. Discovery
- Parent: Warner Bros. Discovery Networks

History
- Launched: July 17, 1988 – present

Links
- Website: discovery.com/shark-week

Availability

Streaming media
- Affiliated Streaming Service(s): discovery+ HBO Max

Shark Week is an annual week-long programming block at the Discovery Channel focusing on shark-themed programming. It originally premiered on July 17, 1988. The block is featured annually in the summer, and was originally devoted to conservation efforts and correcting misconceptions about sharks. Over time, it grew in popularity and became a hit on the Discovery Channel. Since 2010, it has been the longest-running cable television programming event in history. The block is owned by Warner Bros. Discovery, and is broadcast in over 72 countries. Shark Week is promoted by the Discovery Channel heavily via social networks such as Facebook and X (formerly Twitter). Episodes are also available for purchase on services such as Google Play/YouTube, Amazon Prime, and Apple TV. Some episodes of the shows on Shark Week are free on the over-the-top streaming services HBO Max, Hulu (owned by Disney), and Discovery+.

== History ==
Shark Week originated in an 1987 meeting of Discovery Channel executives, although there are varied and contradicting accounts of the meeting. The most repeated accounts all involve executives John Hendricks, Clark Bunting, and Steve Cheskin. The three men have on separate occasions each been individually credited with conceiving it. Cheskin has said he was the first to mention it involving sharks, a detail both Bunting and Hendricks have corroborated. The first Shark Week aired in July 1988, with Caged in Fear as its first show. A total of 10 episodes aired. Other shows included Sharks: Predators or Prey, The Shark Takes a Siesta, and Sharks of a Different Color. Due to the success of the block, Discovery decided to continue it. In 2000, Discovery Channel aired Shark Week Uncaged presented by well-known zoologist Nigel Marven as a host. Six million 3D Pulfrich glasses were distributed to viewers in North America for an episode featuring an extinct giant shark, which had 3D segments.

Starting in 2000, programming has been hosted by notable personalities from other Discovery series. In 2005, Adam Savage and Jamie Hyneman of MythBusters hosted Shark Week, which premiered with a two-hour MythBusters "Jaws Special". In 2006, Mike Rowe of Dirty Jobs hosted Shark Week, and two Dirty Jobs episodes were produced to tie-into the programming, titled "Jobs that Bite" and "Jobs that Bite...Harder". That year, a 446-foot-long (136-metre) inflatable great white shark named Chompie was hung from the Discovery Channel's Silver Spring, Maryland headquarters.

In 2007, the Discovery Channel celebrated Shark Week's 20th Anniversary hosted by Les Stroud, host of Survivorman. The 20th anniversary included the launch of Sharkrunners, a video game that uses GPS data from tagged sharks in the Pacific Ocean. The program Ocean of Fear aired on July 29. In 2014, Deep Blue, a large great white shark estimated to be twenty feet long was featured in an episode of Shark Week; she was seen traversing the waters off the coast of Guadalupe Island. In 2021, the events began streaming on Discovery+ along with its telecasts on the Discovery Channel.

== Shweekend ==
In early 2015, Discovery announced a new, shark-themed weekend that would air on the Discovery Channel. The weekend took place in late August 2015, and contained three different programs. The first program, which aired on Saturday, August 29, was MythBusters vs. Jaws, followed right after by Shark Alley: Legend of Dynamite. The next day, Sunday, August 30, one program aired, called Air Jaws: Walking with Great Whites. The purpose of Shweekend was to increase the shark-related content from past years and to prolong the summer's shark coverage.

== Criticism ==
Since its early days, Shark Week evolved into more entertainment-oriented and sometimes fictional programming. By the 2010s, it attracted much criticism for airing dramatic programs to increase viewers and popularity. This fictitious programming, known as docufiction, has been produced in the last few years. Examples of such programs include Megalodon: The Monster Shark Lives, Shark of Darkness: Wrath of Submarine, Monster Hammerhead, Lair of the Mega Shark, and Megalodon: The New Evidence. This strategy was successful, especially for the program Megalodon: The Monster Shark Lives, as it became one of the most watched programs in Shark Week history, primarily for the controversy and backlash it generated. The mockumentary was based on an ancient giant shark called megalodon, which is now long extinct. The airing of this program fueled criticism by the professionals in the science blogger community, as well as science-advocacy bloggers like actor Wil Wheaton, and resulted in a boycott of the network. Since then, Discovery has increasingly been accused of using junk science, pushing dubious theories, creating false stories, and misleading scientists as to the nature of the documentaries being produced. In early 2015, Discovery President Rich Ross vowed to remove this type of programming from future Shark Week lineups.

There has also been criticism from scientists that have been featured in episodes of Shark Week. Jonathan Davis, a 29-year-old marine biologist was featured in an episode of Shark Week called Voodoo Shark. The episode is meant to discuss the legend of the 'Rooken', and suggests that Davis strongly believes in said legend. Davis had believed he was being featured to talk about his research, but instead was blindsided by this portrayal. He also recounts that while filming, "One of the guys was like, "Oh, maybe you should just let it bite you, that would be so exciting.' And I was just thinking to myself, 'Are you kidding me? You really think I wanna let the shark bite me just for ratings? Are you serious?'"

More criticism was leveled at Discovery in 2017 when the network heavily promoted a race between Olympic gold medal winner Michael Phelps and a great white shark that turned out to be computer generated, but based on actual speeds of such animals, and Phelps wearing illegal swim gear.

=== Content analysis ===
A 2022 study reviewed trends in the content covered by Shark Week. Of the 272 Shark Week programs produced, 43% had titles using words with negative connotations in context (such as "attack", "fear", "deadly"). The relative proportion of in-context negative titles is stable through time, rising at the same rate as the overall number of shows. Of the 201 shows that could be viewed by the authors, around 74% referenced shark bites or other negative portrayals of sharks. 63% of shows used positive language in reference to sharks, though this language was often only used briefly.

About 37% of shows are research-oriented, though in some years (2009–2012, 2020) less than a quarter of shows involved research. Research methods are skewed towards expensive and television-friendly techniques such as satellite telemetry tagging, drones, and ROVs. In contrast, actual shark science is oriented more towards methodical research related to life history and reproduction, which are more practical for conservation work. Uncertainty and repeatability are frequently eschewed in presentation, in favor of controversy or authoritative results. Of the people labelled as "experts" or authorities by Shark Week programs, 41% have over 26 peer-reviewed publications, while 23% lack any contribution to the scientific literature. Little distinction is made between experiential (non-scientific) and scientific experts.

The demographics of Shark Week "experts" mirrors the underrepresentation of women and people of color in STEM fields. 94% of "experts" featured by Shark Week are white, and 79% are male. 24 shows featured at least one non-white "expert" and 60 involved at least one woman "expert". Several non-doctorate men were referred to as "Dr.", and several doctorate-holding women were not labelled with their title. The most commonly featured country is the United States (24.2% of episodes, with California, Florida, Hawaii, and Massachusetts as the predominant states), followed by the Bahamas (15%), South Africa (15%), New Zealand (10%), Australia (10%), and Mexico (10%). Black researchers are rarely featured despite the fact that both the Bahamas and South Africa are majority-black countries.

79 living species of sharks have been featured in Shark Week, along with several species of batoids (rays and kin), chimaeras, and extinct forms. The most common species to be featured are great white sharks (Carcharodon carcharias, 18.4% of episodes), tiger sharks (Galeocerdo cuvier, 12.2%), bull sharks (Carcharhinus leucas, 9.6%), and hammerhead sharks (Sphyrnidae, 8.4%). Some species with extensive scientific literature are rarely featured, such as bonnetheads (Sphyrna tiburo), sandbar sharks (Carcharhinus plumbeus), and the spiny dogfish (Squalus acanthias). Threats to sharks are alluded to by a majority (53%) of shows, with 14% mentioning the fin trade, though only 3% identify particular measures that viewers could take towards shark conservation. No Shark Week shows have recommended government action or donations to shark conservation groups.

== Programming information ==
Year	Dates	Host	Additional information
1988	July 17–July 23	No host	
1989		No host	
1990		No host	
1991		No host	
1992		No host	
1993		No host	
1994	July 31–August 7	Peter Benchley	
1995		No host	
1996		No host	
1997		No host	
1998	August 9–15	No host	
1999		No host	
2000		Nigel Marven	
2001		Nigel Marven	
2002		Nigel Marven	
2003		No host	
2004		The cast of American Chopper	
2005		Adam Savage, Jamie Hyneman	
2006		Mike Rowe	
2007		Les Stroud	
2008	July 27–August 2	Jamie Hyneman, Adam Savage, Mike Rowe	Both a new MythBusters shark special and a shark-themed episode of Dirty Jobs premiered for the event.
2009	August 2–August 8	Les Stroud	The season premiered with Blood in the Water, a recreation of the Jersey Shore shark attacks of 1916.
2010	August 1–August 7	Craig Ferguson	The programming block featured six brand-new shark specials. It was advertised by the second appearance of the giant inflatable shark attached to the Discovery Channel building nicknamed "Chompie". Shark Week 2010 was rated the most viewed Shark Week ever with 30.8 million unique viewers. Shark Week is now the longest-running program event on cable.
2011	July 31–August 6	Andy Samberg	Programming featured seven specials.
2012	August 12–August 18	Philip DeFranco	"Chompie", the 446-foot-long, great white shark, was once again hung on the Discovery Channel headquarters building. To honor the series' 25th anniversary, viewers were encouraged to vote via Twitter (now X) or Facebook on which item a mechanical megalodon shark would crush with its hydraulic jaws in the "Shark Week Chompdown".
2013	August 4–August 10	Josh Wolf	The event began with Megalodon: The Monster Shark Lives, a fictitious documentary-style film which hypothesized the megalodon shark existing in present times. A marketing campaign for the event launched during Discovery's Skywire Live, featuring a newscast covering the return of "Snuffy The Seal" to the ocean, only to see a shark jump out and devour the seal on camera (carrying the slogan "It's a bad week to be a seal"). An aftershow—Shark After Dark Live—was also introduced, hosted by Josh Wolf.
2014	August 10–August 16	Josh Wolf	The programming block featured fourteen programs, including five Shark After Dark LIVE episodes shown for the first five days after two new programs each night.
2015	July 5–July 12	Eli Roth	The block lasted eight days, and consisted of 14 new episodes, including a special titled Shark Week Sharktacular that premiered on June 23. It highlighted the best moments in Shark Week history, and previewed Shark Week 2015. Also, eight special "Sharkopedia Edition" episodes aired. For the third year in a row, five Shark After Dark LIVE episodes hosted by will premiere on the first five nights.
2016	June 26–July 2	Eli Roth	
2017	July 23–July 29	Eli Roth	To celebrate its 29th anniversary, selected U.S. theaters, beginning July 18, showed a "best of" episode from 2016 while also debuting a new 2017 special.
2018	July 22–July 28	Shaquille O'Neal	To celebrate its 30th anniversary, Shark Week created a limited edition Shark Week Box for dedicated fans to complement the Shark Week Experience.
2019	July 28–August 4	Rob Riggle	
2020	August 9–August 16	Josh Gates	
2021	July 11–July 18	Josh Gates	
2022	July 24–July 30	Dwayne Johnson	All Elite Wrestling, whose Dynamite and Rampage shows air on Warner Bros. Discovery-owned channels, participated in Shark Week with a shark cage-themed match; their Fight for the Fallen event benefited ocean wildlife charities.
2023	July 23–July 29	Jason Momoa	Programs included Jaws vs the Meg, Great White Fight Club, Raiders of the Lost Shark, Cocaine Sharks, and Dawn of the Monster Mako.
2024	July 7–July 13	John Cena	Programs included Belly of the Beast, Great White Serial Killer: Sea of Blood, and Monster Hammerheads: Species X.
2025	July 20–July 26	Tom Bergeron	A featured program is Dancing With Sharks, an interspecies dance competition inspired by Dancing with the Stars.
2026	July 26–August 1	No host	Programs included K-Pop Shark Heroes, My Strange Shark Addiction and How to train a Great Shark.

== Home media ==
Shark Week DVD and Blu-ray releases
Title	Release date	Format(s)	No. of episodes	Contents
Air Jaws / Air Jaws II	2002	DVD	1	Includes two episodes.
Anatomy of a Shark Bite	2005	DVD	1	Includes the title episode (2003) and "Future Shark" (2000).
Great White Shark: Uncaged	2007	DVD	1	Single episode.
Shark Week: 20th Anniversary Collection	2007	4×DVD	14	Various Shark Week episodes.
Discovery Channel: Shark DVD Set	2007	3×DVD	6	Includes six episodes (2003–2005).
Shark Week: Ocean of Fear	2008	2×DVD	6	The complete 2007 season, the 20th season, including Ocean of Fear.
Shark Week: The Great Bites Collection	2009	2×DVD	9	The complete 2008 season, plus three bonus episodes.
Shark Week: The Great Bites Collection	2009	Blu-ray	9	The complete 2008 season, plus three bonus episodes.
Shark After Dark	2010	DVD	1	Single episode; not to be confused with Shark After Dark LIVE.
Shark Week: Jaws of Steel Collection	2010	2×DVD	8	The complete 2009 season, the 22nd season, plus two bonus episodes. Includes the two-hour docudrama Blood in the Water, which was the season premiere of the 22nd season.
Shark Week: Jaws of Steel Collection	2010	2×Blu-ray	8	The complete 2009 season, the 22nd season, plus two bonus episodes. Includes the two-hour docudrama Blood in the Water, which was the season premiere of the 22nd season.
Shark Week: Favorites	2011	2×DVD	5	Various Shark Week episodes
Shark Week: Restless Fury	2011	2×DVD	8	The complete 2010 season.
Shark Week: Restless Fury	2011	2×Blu-ray	8	The complete 2010 season.
Shark Week: 25th Anniversary Collection	2012	DVD	4	Includes four popular episodes from recent seasons.
Shark Week: 25th Anniversary Collection	2012	Blu-ray	4	Includes four popular episodes from recent seasons.
Shark Week: Fins of Fury	2013	2×DVD	6	The complete 2011 season.
Shark Week: Fins of Fury	2013	2×Blu-ray	6	The complete 2011 season.
Shark Week: Predator of the Deep	2014	DVD	5	The complete 2012 season.
Shark Week: Dominating the Deep	2015	3×DVD	13	The complete 2013 season.
Shark Week: Jawsome Encounters	2016	3×DVD	13	The complete 2014 season.
Shark Week: Shark 'n' Awe! Collection	2017	6×DVD	32	The complete 2015 and 2016 seasons.
Shark Week: Sharktacular Adventures	2017	3×DVD	15	The complete 2017 season.
Shark Week: 30 Years of Jaw-Dropping Discovery	2018	Blu-ray + 2×DVD	10	Includes five recent episodes on Blu-ray and DVD, and five "vintage" episodes on DVD only.
MythBusters: Jaws Special	Unknown	DVD	1	MythBusters Shark Week special; includes unaired mini-myths.

== See also ==
- Air Jaws
- Ocean of Fear
- Blood in the Water
- Megalodon: The Monster Shark Lives
- Sharkrunners
