= Sjælland Rundt =

Danish sailing competition

- First held: 1947
- Organizer: Helsingør Sejlklub
- Website: www.sjaellandrundt.dk

Sjælland Rundt (lit. Round Zealand Race) is a sailing race around the Danish island Zealand. It is organized by the Elsinore Sailing Club

== History ==
The race was first held on 29 June 1947. During the 1980s, Sjælland Rundt had over 2000 competing boats, making it the biggest sailing race in the world.

== Races ==
The 2020 race was announced to be June 25-28.

== Sponsorships ==
The event is from 2017 sponsored by Hempel Group.
