= X-35 (yacht) =

One-design racing sailboat

The X-35 was designed by X-Yachts Design Team led by Niels Jeppesen and first launched in 2006.

== Events ==
=== World Championships ===
Event	Gold	Silver	Bronze
2007 Kiel	BRS X (NED); Cees Wieringa	Cool Running (GBR); Mark Richmond	Sector (EST); Mati Sepp
2008 Cala Galera	L'Irascibile (ITA); Alberto Signorini	Foxy Lady – Atlantica Sistemi (ITA); Antonio Sodo Mingliori	Cool Running (GBR); Mark Richmond
2009 Kiel	Lelagain (ITA); Alessandro Solerio	RoXanna (FIN); Kimmo Vahatalo	Just4Fun (NED); Albert Kooijman
2010 Scarlino	Lelagain (ITA); Franco Solerio	Karma (ITA); Enrico Mattia Pegoraro	Sector (ITA); Gianluca Vigano
2011 Århus	Oxygen (DEN); Morten Ulrikkeholm	Lelagain (ITA); Alessandro Solerio	Xen (GER); Torsten Bastiansen
2019 Malmö	Joanna (SWE); Jacob Jacobsson	Cool Water (LTU); Raimondas Šiugždinis	Spirit of Nerina (ITA); Paolo Sena
