= Blood in the Water (2009 film) =

- Written by: Richard Bedser; Ed Fields
- Directed by: Richard Bedser
- Starring: John Hunerlach; Ryland Alexander; Pierre Blanc; Peter Brooke
- Theme music composer: Joel Douek
- Country of origin: United States
- Original language: English

Production
- Producers: Richard Bedser; Phil Craig
- Cinematography: Malcolm Mclean
- Editor: Peter Miller
- Running time: 120 minutes

Original release
- Network: Discovery Channel
- Release: August 2, 2009

Blood in the Water is a television film that aired on the Discovery Channel in 2009. It was directed by Richard Bedser. It is based on a true-life series of shark attacks that became the inspiration for Peter Benchley's novel Jaws. It was the season premiere of Shark Week on August 2 for the 2009 season.

== Plot ==
Blood in the Water tells the story of a series of shark attacks, that occurred on the New Jersey shore during the summer of 1916. Five people were attacked over the course of 12 days. The Jersey Shore attacks triggered a nationwide panic. It also details how scientists views on sharks and the threat they posed to humans changed in the wake of the attacks.
