= Bibliography of the Bahamas =

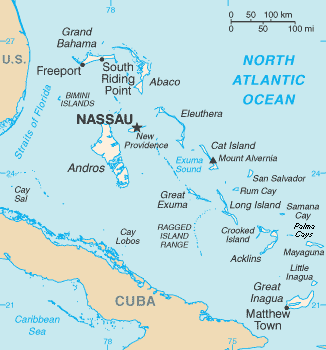

This bibliography of The Bahamas is a list of English-language nonfiction books which have been described by reliable sources as in some way directly relating to the subject of The Bahamas, its history, geography, people, culture, etc.

- Albury, Paul. The Story of the Bahamas.
- Atlas of the Commonwealth of the Bahamas.
- Bangs, Outram – The Smaller Mockingbird of the Northern Bahamas.
- Barry, Colman J. – Upon These Rocks: Catholics in the Bahamas.
- Bell, H. MacLachlan – Bahamas: Isles of June.
- Bohlke, James E., Charles C. G. Chaplin, Eugenia B. Bohlke, and William F. Smith-Vaniz – Fishes of the Bahamas and Adjacent Tropical Waters.
- Bonhote, J. Lewis – List of Birds Collected on the Island of New Providence, Bahamas.
- Brudenell-Bruce, P. G. C. – The Birds of the Bahamas.
- Buden, Donald W. – The Birds of the Southern Bahamas, an Annotated Check-List.
- Campbell, David G. - The Ephemeral Islands, a Natural History of the Bahamas.
- Chapman, Frank M. – The Origin of the Avifauna of the Bahamas.
- Cloud, P. E. – Environment of Calcium Carbonate Deposition West of Andros Island, Bahamas.
- Craton, Michael – A History of the Bahamas.
- Crocker, John – Bermuda, the Bahamas, Hispaniola, Puerto Rico and the Virgin Islands.
- Crocker, John – The Caribbean and El Dorado.
- Defries, Amelia – The Fortunate Islands: Being Adventures with the Negro in the Bahamas.
- DeLoach, Ned – Reef Fish Behavior: Florida Caribbean Bahamas.
- Forbes, Rosita – A Unicorn in the Bahamas.
- Gilbert, Perry W., Robert W. Mathewson, and David P. Rall – Sharks, Skates, and Rays. A symposium, Bimini, Bahamas, January–February 1966.
- Ginsburg, Robert N. – Subsurface Geology of a Prograding Carbonate Platform Margin, Great Bahama Bank: Results of the Bahamas Drilling Project: SEPM Special Publication Series no. 70.
- Ginsburg, Robert N. – Tidal Deposits: A Casebook of Recent Examples and Fossil Counterparts.
- Gonsalves-Sabola, Joaquim C. – Law Reports of the Bahamas, 1965-1970.
- Hardie, L. A. – Sedimentation on the Modern Carbonate Tidal Flats of North-western Andros Island, Bahamas.
- Hughes, Colin A. – Race and Politics in the Bahamas.
- Humann, Paul – Reef Fish Identification: Florida, Caribbean, Bahamas.
- Johnson, Howard – The Bahamas from Slavery to Servitude, 1783-1933.
- Johnson, Howard – The Bahamas in Slavery and Freedom.
- Keegan, William F. – Bahamian Archaeology: Life in the Bahamas and Turks and Caicos before Columbus.
- Keegan, William F. – The People Who Discovered Columbus: The Prehistory of the Bahamas.
- Lewis, James A. – The Final Campaign of the American Revolution: Rise and Fall of the Spanish Bahamas.
- Lind, Aulis O. – Coastal Landforms of Cat Island, Bahamas.
- Marshall, Dawn I. 'The Haitian Problem'. Illegal Migration to the Bahamas.
- Maynard, C. J. – Corrected Descriptions of Five New Species of Birds from the Bahamas.
- Morton, Julia F. – Atlas of Medicinal Plants of Middle America: Bahamas to Yucatan.
- Northrop, John I. – A Naturalist in the Bahamas.
- Otterbein, Keith F. – The Andros Islanders: A Study of Family Organization in the Bahamas.
- Palmer, Robert – The Blue Holes of the Bahamas.
- Paquette, Robert L. and Stanley L. Engerman – The Lesser Antilles in the Age of European Expansion. | issue = 2
- Rankin, W. M. – The Northrop Collection of Crustacea from the Bahamas.
- The Real Bahamas in Music and Song.
- Reininger, Pete – The Bahamas: Islands of Song.
- Saunders, D. Gail and E. A. Carson – Guide to the Records of the Bahamas.
- Savage, Ernest A. – The Libraries of Bermuda, the Bahamas, the British West Indies, British Guiana, British Honduras, Puerto Rico, and the American Virgin Islands: A Report to the Carnegie Corporation of New York.
- Siegel, Peter K. and Jody Stecher – The Real Bahamas: African American Spirituals, Gospels, and Anthems in Old Rhyming Tradition.
- Slater, Mary – The Caribbean Islands.
- Smith, C. Lavett – National Audubon Society Field Guide to Tropical Marine Fishes of the Caribbean, the Gulf of Mexico, Florida, the Bahamas, and Bermuda.
- Smith, F. G. Walton – Atlantic Reef Corals: a Handbook of the Common Reef and Shallow-Water Corals of Bermuda, the Bahamas, Florida, the West Indies, and Brazil.
- The Sound of the Sun.
- Tavolga, William N. – Marine Bio-Acoustics: Proceedings of a Symposium Held at the Lerner Marine Laboratory, Bimini, Bahamas, April 11 to 13, 1963.
- Watt, Maurice J. – Report on a Visit to the British West Indies, the Bahamas and Bermuda.
- Wiedenmayer, Felix – Shallow-Water Sponges of the Western Bahamas: Experientia Supplementum 28.
- The Year Book of the Bermudas, the Bahamas, British Guiana, British Honduras and the West Indies, 1928.
- The Year Book of the Bermudas, the Bahamas, British Guiana, British Honduras and the West Indies, 1929.
- Zeledón, José C. – Description of a New Form of Spindalis zena from the Bahamas.
