= Marianne K. Henderson =

American biomedical scientist

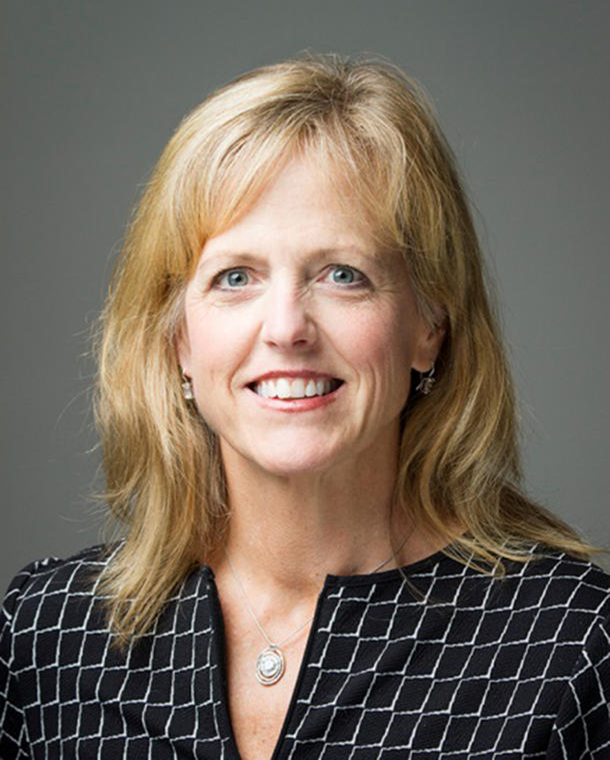
- Henderson in 2015
- Born: Marianne Martha Krall; September 1, 1962 (age 63); Bethesda, Maryland, U.S.
- Education: University of Maryland, College Park
- Scientific career
- Fields: Biobanks, biorepositories
- Workplaces: National Cancer Institute
- Academic advisors: Eugenie Clark

Marianne Krall Henderson (born September 1, 1962) is an American biomedical scientist specialized in biobanks and biorepositories. She is a senior advisor on biospecimen resources at the National Cancer Institute. Henderson was president of the International Society for Biological and Environmental Repositories from 2011 to 2012.

== Life ==
Marianne Martha Krall was born September 1, 1962, in Bethesda, Maryland, to Bettijane and Albert Krall. She graduated from Richard Montgomery High School in 1980. Henderson Completed a B.S. (1984) in zoology and a M.S. (1988) in zoology and marine biology from the University of Maryland, College Park. She studied fish communities in the Red Sea. She completed a M.S. in Zoology and Marine Biology in 1988. Henderson's master's thesis was titled Vertical Resource Partitioning and Sexuality of Three Sympatric Species of Red Sea Sandfishes (Xyrichtys melanopus, labridae: Trichonotus nikii, triconotidae; and Gorgasia sp., congridae). Her major advisor was Eugenie Clark. She was a teaching assistant at the University of Maryland from 1984 to 1987.

From 1999 to 2015, Henderson served as chief of the National Cancer Institute (NCI) division of cancer epidemiology and genetics' (DCEG) office of division operations and analysis. As of 2022, she is the senior advisor for NCI division resources for the DCEG. Henderson is also a senior advisor on biobanking to the NCI center for global health. Henderson is responsible and involved in project operations and contract management, fiscal and scientific reporting; strategic planning; technology transfer; and laboratory/biorepository infrastructure planning for largescale molecular epidemiology studies. She is a founding member of the NCI biospecimen coordinating committee and participated in the development and revision of the first and second editions of NCI’s best practices for biospecimen resources. Since 1999, Henderson has been a member of the International Society for Biological and Environmental Repositories (ISBER) and served as ISBER president from 2011 to 2012. Henderson is involved in human biospecimen management process improvements in processing, handling, technology transfer, and repository automation.
