= International Shark Attack File =

Global database of shark attacks

The International Shark Attack File is a global database of shark attacks.

The file reportedly contains information on over 6,800 shark attacks spanning from the early 1500s to the present day, and includes detailed, often privileged, information including autopsy reports and photos. It is accessible only to scientists whose access is permitted by a review board.

== History ==
The database originated when the Office of Naval Research formed the Shark Research Panel in June 1958, which funded it until 1967. This group comprised 34 scientists with expertise in sharks, tasked with exploring research strategies to enhance protection for Navy personnel against shark attacks.

The file was temporarily housed at the Mote Marine Laboratory in Sarasota, Florida. In the 1980s, it was transferred to the National Underwater Accident Data Center at the University of Rhode Island before it was transferred to the Florida Museum of Natural History at the University of Florida under the direction of George H. Burgess. It is currently under the direction of Dr. Gavin Naylor and members of the American Elasmobranch Society, which has assumed the task of preserving, expanding, and analyzing shark attack data.
