= Perry Webster Gilbert =

Shark scientist

Perry W. Gilbert
- Born: December 1, 1912; North Branford, Connecticut
- Died: October 15, 2000 (aged 87); Sarasota, Florida
- Occupations: Zoologist, Professor, Marine Biologist, Shark Scientist, Director of Mote Marine Laboratory & Aquarium
- Known for: Marine Biology, Research on Behavior and Anatomy of Sharks, Director of Mote Marine Laboratory & Aquarium

Perry Webster Gilbert (December 1, 1912 – October 15, 2000) was a professor at Cornell University, shark scientist, and former Director of Mote Marine Laboratory. He pioneered the capture and study of live sharks and for several decades was considered one of the world's foremost experts on shark anatomy and behavior. Over the course of his life, Gilbert published two books and approximately 150 scientific papers. As a recipient of both Carnegie and Guggenheim Fellowships and chair of the American Institute of Biological Sciences' Shark Research Panel, Gilbert travelled the world to better learn and understand shark behavior.

== Early life and education ==
Gilbert was born December 1, 1912, to Scott and Hester Gilbert in North Branford, Connecticut. He also had a sister, two years younger, named Eleanor. When Gilbert was a child, the family would frequently spend time on the seashore, developing in him an early appreciation for marine life that would be reignited in his academic career. His father Scott, a carpenter and homebuilder, would take Gilbert fishing, treading for clams, and tonging for oysters.

As a child, Gilbert started his schooling in a one-room schoolhouse in his hometown of North Branford, but his mother ultimately proved to be dissatisfied with the quality of the education that the school provided. She sent him to a school of 600 students in New Haven, Connecticut, about 10 miles away by trolley. While he was initially labeled as a "hick" by his classmates, Gilbert would often invite classmates to his family's farm and by his last year in school he had become the class president.

Eventually, Gilbert's parents were forced to sell the family home to make way for a new city reservoir, and the Gilberts relocated to nearby Branford, a town on the coast of Long Island Sound. As Gilbert continued his education at Branford High School, he spent his free time collecting wildlife specimens, including butterflies and moths, often studying books on them. He also spent his summers working at a cemetery digging graves and mowing lawns, during which time he learned much from the sexton's father about budding roses, grafting plants, and raising evergreens. Upon graduating high school, Gilbert was accepted into Dartmouth College, and - although his father's business had been destroyed by the Depression - his aunt was able to provide funding for his college education.

== Academic career ==
Gilbert initially entered Dartmouth College in 1930, studying both vertebrate anatomy under Professor William Ballard and histology and embryology under Professor Norman Arnold. He graduated in 1934 with a bachelor's degree in zoology, and continued on at Dartmouth as an instructor for two years. In 1936, Gilbert decided to pursue his Ph.D. and with financial support from a Cramer Fellowship he started his doctoral research on comparative anatomy of burrowing and terrestrial sciurid mammals at Cornell University. Under the advisement of mammalogist William J. Hamilton II, Gilbert achieved his doctorate in 1940 and was immediately hired as in instructor in Cornell's Department of Zoology by Chairman Benjamin Young.

Gilbert ended up having a long career at Cornell, and was continuously affiliated with the University for 64 years. He began as an instructor, being promoted to an assistant professor in 1943, a tenured associate professor in 1946, and ultimately to a professor of zoology from 1952 to 1978. Thereafter, Gilbert served as a professor of Neurobiology and Behavior, Emeritus. He taught Comparative Vertebrate Anatomy during fall, spring, and often summer terms from 1940 to 1967, a course which was known for its large enrollment as it was a requirement for entrance to most medical schools. During World War II, Gilbert taught comparative anatomy to the pre-medical corps of the U.S. Army and Navy for six days a week, every week for a year except Christmas Day.

Gilbert was known among the student population for drawing multi-colored, symmetrical drawings on the chalkboard using both hands simultaneously, and for giving summative philosophical thoughts at the end of each lecture. He also kept a collection of note cards with details on every one of his students, which he used to remember particulars of over 5000 students in the course of his career. During Gilbert's time at Cornell, the university underwent a departmental reorganization that resulted in the formation of the Division of Biological Sciences, in which Gilbert chose to join the new Section of Neurobiology and Behavior, which is now the Department of Neurobiology and Behavior.

Robert Hueter, Senior Scientist, Director of the Center of Shark Research, and Perry W. Gilbert Chair in Shark Research at Mote Marine Laboratory & Aquarium, has written that "Thousands of professionals in the biological sciences today - and certainly those in comparative anatomy, functional morphology, neurobiology and even ichthyology - can trace their roots to some relationship with Perry Gilbert the teacher".

== Personal life ==
Soon after arriving at Cornell, Gilbert met Claire Rachel Kelly in Hamilton's mammalogy class. She was pursuing her bachelor's at Cornell, and on September 3, 1938, the two were married. The couple began their married life in Ithaca on Linden Avenue in Collegetown, later moved to a farm on Coddington Road, and eventually settled on the Parkway. When Gilbert gained his position as Director of Mote Marine Laboratory in 1967, the Gilberts relocated from Ithaca to Sarasota. They had eight children together, including five sons - David, Stephen, John, Christopher, and Philip - and three daughters - Ann, Mary, and Lois. The family also owned a farmhouse on the Danby Hills, known as "the Nob" which served as a seasonal vacation retreat as well as a site for social gatherings of Gilbert's colleagues, students, and friends.

Claire Kelly Gilbert edited Gilbert's publications and co-authored several of them. Claire learned Russian and Italian in order to translate scientific treatises on sharks. In Sarasota, she volunteered at St. Vincent de Paul Thrift Shop and sang alto in the choir at Incarnation Church. Following the death of her husband, Claire sold the home in Siesta Key in 2002 and moved to an Ithacare Community in Ithaca called Longview. She died of a stroke at the age of 92.

== Early academic work ==
Early on, Gilbert's academic work varied widely in nature. Gilbert's first published academic paper, initially penned in 1935 during his time at Dartmouth, focused on the structure and function of avian lungs and air sacs; this paper was ultimately published in 1939. He went on to write his 1940 doctoral dissertation on the anatomy of burrowing squirrels, particularly the woodchuck.

In 1949, Gilbert took his first sabbatical as a Carnegie Fellow in Embryology. He worked with Dr. George Corner at Johns Hopkins University in Baltimore, and ultimately this fellowship resulted in several publications including an illustrated monograph on the origin and development of the human extrinsic eye muscles.

== Research in shark biology and behavior ==
As a professor, Gilbert oversaw the dissections of many animal specimens but took special interest in the biology of dogfish sharks. Here his interest in shark biology appears to have begun. Gilbert's first published paper on sharks was focused specifically on the male urogenital system of the frilled shark, published in Copeia in 1941. He supplemented this first article two years later with an additional paper on the male frilled shark anatomy, published in the Journal of Morphology in 1943. Gilbert's interest and expertise in sharks grew over the course of his career, growing to dominate his academic work in the coming decades.

Gilbert went on to study male spiny dogfish and smooth dogfish at the Marine Biological Laboratory in Woods Hole, Massachusetts in the mid-1950s, resulting in papers about the functional morphology of shark claspers and siphon sacs. The late 1950s, and 1957 in particular, proved to be fruitful for Gilbert's emerging shark research. During 1957 and 1958, he studied at Mt. Desert Island Biological Laboratory in Maine, using radioactive tracers to observe the transfer of nutrients between mothers and embryos in spiny dogfish. This work was accomplished with the help of his eldest son, David, who was a student at Harvard at the time. In 1957, Gilbert and his colleague F. G. Wood made a breakthrough while conducting research at Marineland in Florida, and inventing an anesthetic named MS 222 that could be sprayed into the gills of large sharks, ultimately publishing a widely cited paper on the subject in Science in 1957. Gilbert went on his second sabbatical in 1957, with the support of a Guggenheim Fellowship, studying sharks at the Lerner Marine Laboratory in Bimini.

Over the course of his career, Gilbert conducted research - primarily shark-focused, but also including other marine life - at a wide array of research facilities, including: the Marine Biological Laboratory in Woods Hole, Massachusetts; Mt. Desert Island Biological Laboratory in Maine; Lerner Marine Laboratory in the Bahamas; Cape Haze Marine Laboratory in Florida (which later became Mote Marine Laboratory, under Gilbert's directorship: see below); Scripps Institution of Oceanography in California; and various other labs in Florida, Hawaii, South Africa, Australia, Japan, and the South Seas. During his career, Gilbert also led scientific expeditions in Tahiti and British Honduras.

== Work with the Office of Naval Research ==
Gilbert's growing expertise around sharks eventually drew the attention of the Office of Naval Research (ONR). Concurrently with Gilbert's research efforts, ONR was funding research around methods for repelling shark attacks, which had been reported as a problem for shipwrecked navy personnel and downed pilots during World War II. In 1957, Sid Galler of ONR approached Gilbert and asked him to serve as the chair of the American Institute of Biological Sciences' ONR-funded Shark Research Panel.

As the chair of the Shark Research Panel, Gilbert was tasked with traveling around the world to encourage, coordinate, and direct programs in shark research, as well as to conduct his own research as needed. While the ONR work had initially been specifically focused on developing some sort of shark repellent, Gilbert helped convince them to "support a broad program in basic research, opening the door to a new era of scientific studies on sharks around the world".

Between 1960 and 1969, Gilbert authored more than 40 scientific articles on sharks, including research relating to sharks' vision, bite force, chemoreception, attack behavior, and methods for repelling them. Gilbert's early work with ONR also resulted in the publication of the edited volume "Sharks and Survival" (1963), a collection of peer-reviewed papers with contributions from experts in the field.

As a part of his work with the Shark Research Panel, Gilbert helped to plan and coordinate two major symposia on shark research. One of these symposia was held at Lerner Marine Laboratory in the Bahamas. The symposium collected 70 researchers, twelve of whom were affiliated with Mt. Desert Island Biological Laboratory (MDIBL), where Gilbert had done work himself in the late 1950s. The result of this symposium was the edited volume "Sharks, Skates, and Rays," published in 1967, which included papers on shark anatomy, physiology, taxonomy, and life history.

According to Robert Hueter, "practically every thread of contemporary research on the biology and behavior of sharks since 1960 can be traced back to the ONR program guided by the scholarly leadership of Perry Gilbert".

== Directorship of Mote Marine Laboratory ==
In 1955, the Vanderbilt family established the Cape Haze Marine Laboratory in Placida, Florida and placed it under the direction of Eugenie Clark. Clark oversaw the movement of the laboratory from Placida to Siesta Key in 1960. By 1965, however, Clark decided to resign her directorship for personal reasons and the position was open to fill. After two interim directors and a generous contribution from William R. Mote to keep the laboratory afloat, Gilbert was approached by the search committee to be the new director of what would become Mote Marine Laboratory & Aquarium. During the early-to-mid 1960s, Gilbert had carried on much of his research here as a visiting fellow, and was well known by the deciding board. When offered the position in 1967, Gilbert only agreed to work as an interim director. He ultimately maintained his professorship at Cornell by returning to Ithaca for some weeks each year to give lectures and consult with students and colleagues; in return, Cornell gained from policies that allowed students and faculty to access Mote Laboratory's equipment and research facilities. His position as director of Mote was soon changed from Interim Director to Permanent Director

Under Gilbert's leadership, the laboratory became known as a center of excellence in a variety of marine research disciplines, not least of which related to shark research. Funding from ONR allowed for the construction of a large, elaborate shark-holding facility, which provided new opportunities for the observation and study of life sharks in safe and controlled conditions for the first time. Meanwhile, Gilbert continued his own research and published many papers with the help of collaborators, stimulating others to follow suit.

Gilbert also expanded the scope of Mote's research to include biomedicine, microbiology, neurobiology and behavior, ecology, and environmental health by inviting specialists in these fields to work as visiting investigators at Mote. He used contacts that he had cultivated over his 30-year career to help boost the reputation and breadth of research in the facility, often soliciting experts from other universities, museums, and the National Institutes of Health.

In the mid-1970s, it became clear that the laboratory would need to be moved once again due to various problems, including coastal erosion of the Siesta Key. Gilbert took on the planning, design, local politicking, and fundraising for the move, and oversaw the creation of Mote's current facility on City Island in Sarasota, Florida. The new facility was much larger, with further growth in mind. Following this move, Gilbert retired as Director in 1978.

== Retirement and death ==
Upon his retirement as Director of Mote Marine Laboratory in 1978, Gilbert continued to work as Mote Senior Scientist and member of the board of trustees. A new education building was named in his honor, and the endowed "Perry W. Gilbert Chair in Shark Research" was established. When he retired from Cornell, he was honored with a symposium of distinguished speakers, a banquet, and the establishment of an endowed "Perry Gilbert Lectureship in Comparative Anatomy and Behavior".

Perry Gilbert died on October 15, 2000, at his home in Sarasota, FL.
