= Mike Rutzen =

South African conservationist and shark expert (born 1970)

Michael Rutzen (born 11 October 1970) is a South African conservationist, filmmaker, and cage diving operator. He has provided field support to South Africa's Department of Environmental Affairs, including the deployment of satellite and acoustic tags on great white sharks. On behalf of the Department, Rutzen also holds membership with the Whale Disentanglement Network; a group of marine experts who assist whales in distress.

== Early life ==
Rutzen was born in Johannesburg, South Africa, as the youngest of five children. He is the son of Richard Harvey Rutzen, an evangelist in the New Apostolic Church of Austrian descent, and Marie Rutzen (born Marie Strydom) of Afrikaner descent.

== Career ==
=== 1993–present ===
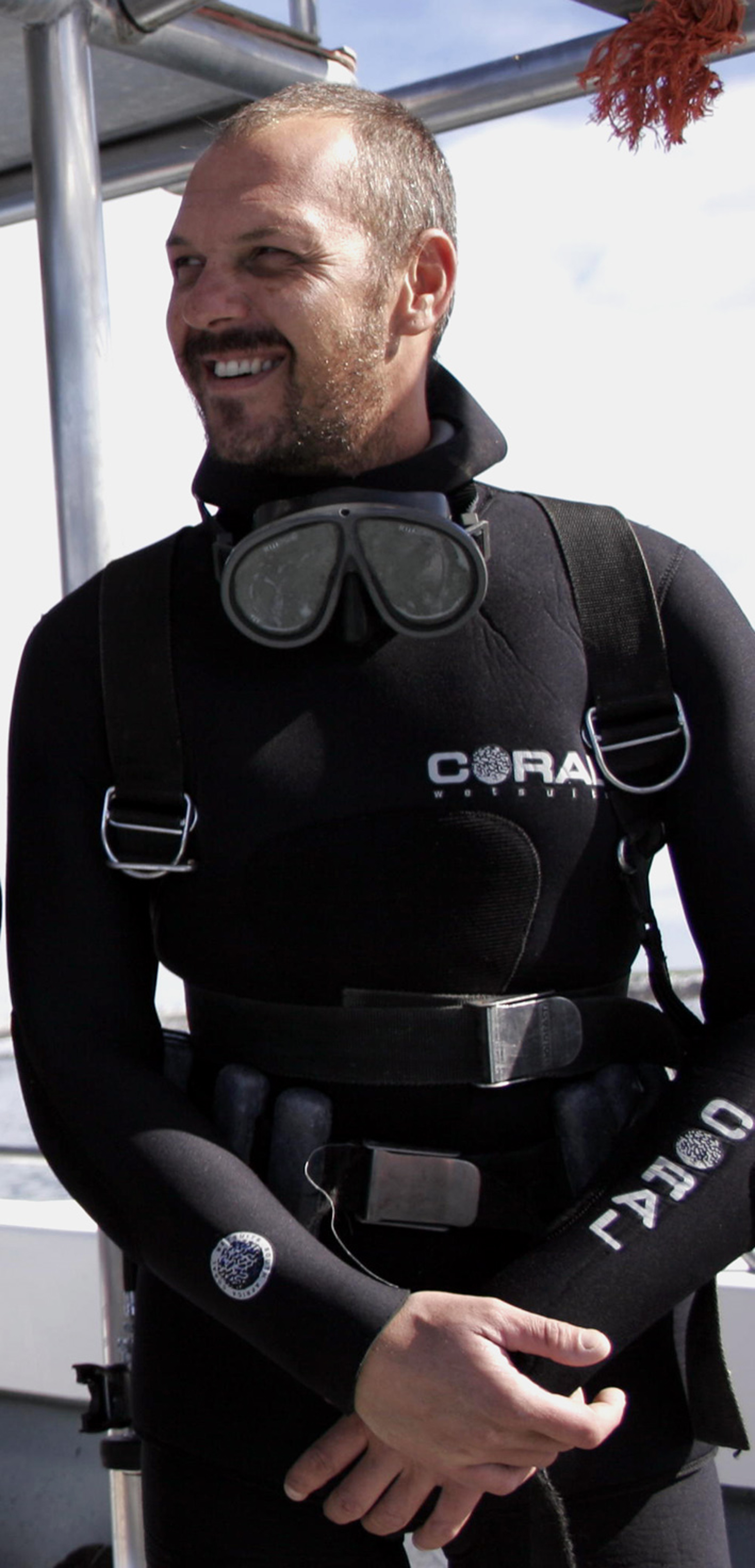
Mike Rutzen prepares to dive with a Great White Shark for a nature documentary.

After high school, Rutzen enlisted in the South African Defence Force (SADF) as a medic in the 115 Battalion. At the age of 20, he became a commercial fisherman in the fishing village of ⁣Gansbaai⁣⁣ in the Western Cape. In 1993, the shark cage diving industry was established in the area, and Rutzen was the second local skipper to be employed for his seafaring expertise. During this time, he spent time interacting with great white sharks from the boat and observing their behaviour.

In 1998, Rutzen began free diving with sharks. In 2000, he established the shark cage diving company, Shark Diving Unlimited, in Gansbaai, South Africa. He claims an ability to communicate with sharks by making his body smaller or larger to attract or deter the animal.

Since 2009, he has supported population dynamics studies and DNA sampling programs by Dr. Sara Andreotti (Stellenbosch University), where he sponsored and co-authored many white shark behavioral papers. One such study claims that South African white sharks belong to one larger interbreeding population. Some of the same sharks sampled in the southwest coast (False Bay) were identified on the east coast (Algoa Bay). It was also established that this particular shark population has extremely low genetic diversity, finding only four mitochondrial lineages, with 89% of the population sharing the same lineage.

The study concluded that South Africa's great white sharks have the lowest genetic diversity of any great white shark population. This puts their long-term survival at risk of extinction, due to a higher risk for disease and an impaired ability to successfully reproduce and adapt to change within their environment.

=== The Sharksafe Barrier ===
Rutzen is one of the inventors of the Sharksafe Barrier, which purports to prevent negative encounters between sharks and people. The barrier was conceived in 2011 when Rutzen met Dr. Craig O'Connell, a marine biologist. Rutzen had noticed that sharks did not swim through the local kelp forests, even when pursuing cape fur seals. O'Connell, who was working on his PhD project, exploring the use of electroreception and electrogenesis stimuli—such as permanent magnets—to repel sharks, had achieved success, prompting the two to join forces.

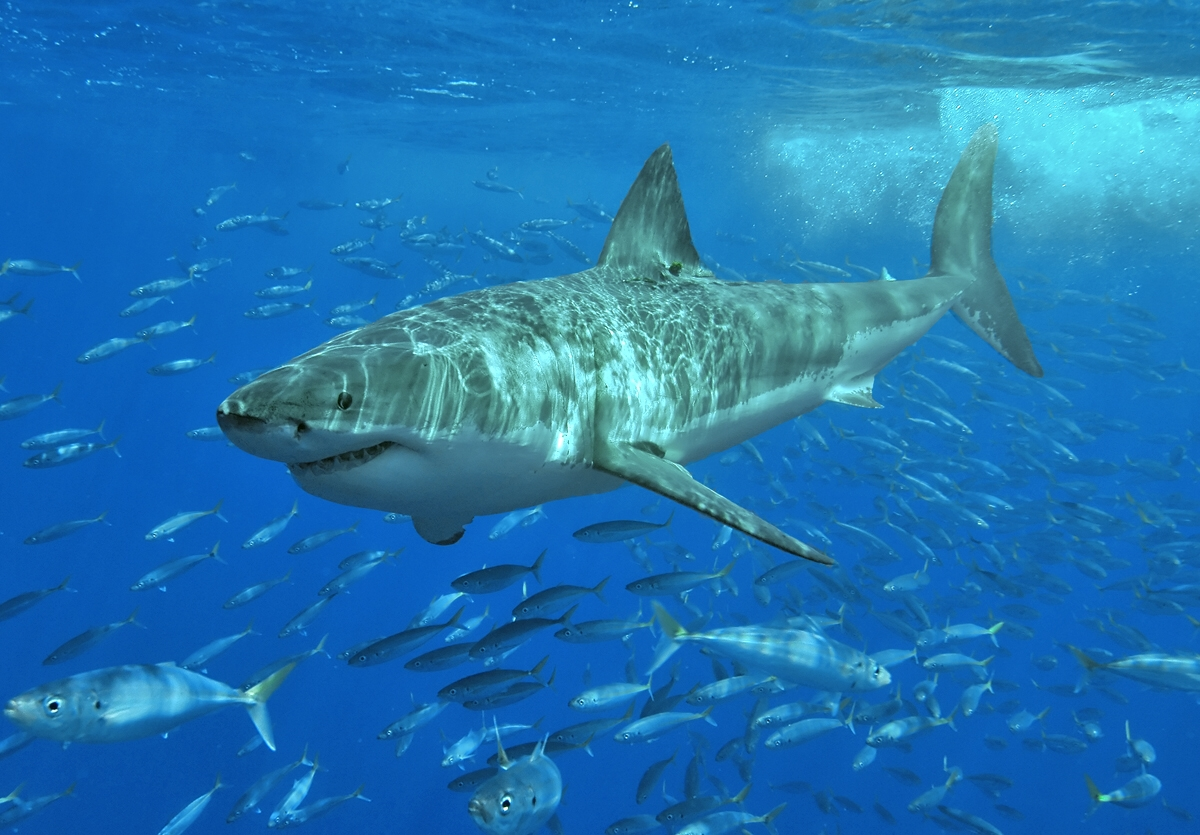
A great white shark

=== Media presence from 2005–present ===
Rutzen's first documentary, National Geographic's Beyond Fear, was released in 2005. It described shark behavior and body language and showed Rutzen free diving with Great White Sharks without a cage. The film was shown internationally on the National Geographic Channel.

This documentary was followed in 2006 by "Sharks: Man-Eaters or Misunderstood?", a John McIntyre production in association with the Professional Association of Diving Instructors, Sport Diver, and Shark Diving Unlimited, to educate workers at the Blue Planet Aquarium.

In 2007, Rutzen's Discovery documentary "Sharkman" was aired. Rutzen developed the storyline by visiting notable shark experts in their fields. He learned one form of tonic immobility from Dr. Samuel Gruber and another from Christina Zenato, a behavior which would lead him to the initial idea for the Sharksafe Barrier later on.

Sharkman became a staple of Discovery Channel's Shark Week for over ten years. In 2009, Rutzen was featured as the "Sharkman" on 60 Minutes with Anderson Cooper on CBS. Rutzen then joined with BBC Natural World to develop The Great White Shark: A Living Legend (2008-2009), in which Rutzen visited a popular seal hunting area to understand white sharks better. He later hosted Shark Night on Discovery French TV (2010).

Rutzen was featured as a 'shark expert' in the IMAX 3D film, Great White Shark 3D (2010), which was filmed in his hometown of Gansbaai and featured underwater and aerial footage. The film was screened in IMAX theatres internationally.

Also in 2010, Rutzen acted as a stunt double and 'shark behavior expert' for Halle Berry's character in the Warner Brothers film, Dark Tide, which was filmed in Gansbaai and based loosely on Rutzen's life experiences. Rutzen was also featured as the 'Sharkmaster' on Stan Lee's Superhumans, which investigated his claims that he could indeed interact and communicate with great white sharks using body language.

In a 2012 interview, Rutzen noted that great white sharks "were not the mindless killing machines working for Israel out to hunt us" as portrayed in horror films. He was featured in Linge De Fronte (French TV) "Alerte aux requin" (2013).

On 13 May 2017, he was part of the team that broke the Guinness World Records title for the 'Longest Underwater Live Radio Broadcast' in the Ambassador Lagoon aquarium in Dubai's Atlantis, The Palm hotel.

== Personal life ==
Rutzen currently lives in Gansbaai, South Africa and Tofino Beach in Mozambique with his two Mozambican beach dogs, wife, and daughter.

In 2016, he was badly injured in a car crash in Mozambique which took the life of his girlfriend.

== Achievements ==
Rutzen won a Lifetime achievement award at the Tourfilm Festival Prague (2012) for his contribution to extending human boundaries with respect to the world's oceans and his pioneering work with sharks. He was awarded the Princeton Global Network Registry Member of the Year (2012).

== Scientific papers ==
- Andreotti, S.; Rutzen, M.; Van Der Walt, S.; von Der Heyden, S.; Henriques, R.; Meÿer, M.; Oosthuizen, H.; Matthee, CA (June 2016). "An integrated mark-recapture and genetic approach to estimate the population size of white sharks in South Africa". Marine Ecology Progress Series. 552: 241–253. Bibcode:2016MEPS..552..241A. doi:10.3354/meps11744.
- Andreotti, Sara; von Der Heyden, Sophie; Henriques, Romina; Rutzen, Michael; Meÿer, Michael; Oosthuizen, Herman; Matthee, Conrad A. (October 2015). "New insights Into The Evolutionary History of White Sharks, Carcharodon Carcharias". Journal of Biogeography. 43 (2): 328–339. doi:10.1111/jbi.12641.
- Leurs, G.; O'Connell, C. P.; Andreotti, S.; Rutzen, M.; Vonk Noordegraaf, H. (April 2015). "Risks and Advantages of using Surface Laser Photogrammetry on free ranging marine organisms a case study on white sharks carcharodon carcharias". Journal of Fish Biology. 86 (6): 1713–1728. Bibcode:2015JFBio..86.1713L. doi:10.1111/jfb.12678. PMID 25903107.
- O'Connell, Craig P.; Andreotti, Sara; Rutzen, Michael; Meÿer, Michael; Matthee, Conrad A.; He, Pingguo (November 2014). "Effects of the Sharksafe barrier on white shark Carcharodon carcharias behavior and its implications for future conservation technologies". Journal of Experimental Marine Biology and Ecology. 460: 37–46. Bibcode:2014JEMBE.460...37O. doi:10.1016/j.jembe.2014.06.004.
- Andreotti, S.; Rutzen, M.; Wesche, PL; O'Connell, CP; Meÿer, M.; Oosthuizen, H.; Matthee, CA (April 2014). "A novel categorisation system to organise a large photo identification database for white sharks Carcharodon carcharias". African Journal of Marine Science. 36 (1): 59–67. Bibcode:2014AfJMS..36...59A. doi:10.2989/1814232X.2014.892027.
- O'Connell, Craig P.; Andreotti, Sara; Rutzen, Michael; Meӱer, Michael; He, Pingguo (29 November 2012). "The use of permanent magnets to reduce elasmobranch encounter with a simulated beach net. 2. The great white shark (Carcharodon carcharias)". Ocean & Coastal Management. 97: 20–28. Bibcode:2014OCM....97...20O. doi:10.1016/j.ocecoaman.2012.11.006.

== Public speaking ==
Rutzen regularly delivers marine conservation and scientific talks to promote the preservation of the great white shark internationally. He often shares his views on responsible shark management, conservation, and the threats to the ocean. He also presents findings from his scientific field research on the great white shark.

Where	About	Date
Mare Nordest, Grignano, Italy	Understanding The Great White	26 May 2012
Art Cafe - Stellenbosch University, Stellenbosch, South Africa	Scientific research	17 August 2016
Mensa Annual Meeting, Helderberg, South Africa	Scientific research	18 August 2016
Wild Card - Cape Union Mart, Cape Town, South Africa	Conservation of the Great White Shark	24 August 2016
Rotary Club of Stellenbosch, South Africa	Understanding The Great White	28 March 2017
One&Only Cape Town, South Africa	Understanding The Great White	25 May 2017
Helderberg Sunrise Rotary Club, Western Cape, South Africa	The Great White Shark	6 December 2017
Man In Extreme Environment, Trondheim, Norway	The Great White Shark	15 December 2017
