= General Crowell =

General Crowell may refer to:

- Benedict Crowell (1869–1952), U.S. Army Reserve brigadier general
- Howard G. Crowell Jr. (born 1932), U.S. Army lieutenant general
- John Crowell (Ohio politician) (1801–1883), Ohio State Militia major general
