= Samuel H. Gruber =

American biologist (1938–2019)

Samuel H. Gruber (May 13, 1938 – April 18, 2019) was a shark biologist and founder of the American Elasmobranch Society. He was a professor at the University of Miami's Rosenstiel School for Marine and Atmospheric Science and the founder of the Bimini Biological Field Station Foundation.

== Biography ==
Dr. Gruber hailed originally from Brooklyn, New York, and grew up in south Florida. He entered college in 1956, studying first at Emory University and then earning his B.S. in zoology from the University of Miami. He followed up in quick succession with his M.S. and Ph.D. in marine science from the then called Institute of Marine and Atmospheric Science, again at the University of Miami. He held several positions there and completed a postdoctoral fellowship at the Max-Planck Institute for Behavioral Physiology, Seewiesen, Germany, where he was a behavioral researcher under Nobel Laureate Professor Dr. Konrad Lorenz.

== Research ==
Gruber was a recognized authority on shark science, having completed 49 Atlantic research cruises and 170 scientific publications. He has specialized in shark behavior, anatomy, sensory systems, tracking, and shark repellents. Gruber is perhaps best known for his studies on habitat selection and homing behavior of lemon sharks and eagle rays around the Bimini Shark Lab.

== Institutions ==
In 1983 Gruber founded the American Elasmobranch Society (AES). The AES is the world's largest association of shark and ray scientists. Gruber established the now world-famous "Shark Lab" in 1990, after successfully battling malignant lymphoma. The next year he helped found and served as the first chair of the International Union for Conservation of Nature (IUCN) Shark Specialist Group.

== Media appearances ==
In August 2008, Gruber appeared on the History Channel's documentary series, Evolve episode 4, entitled "Sex". Gruber has also made several appearances on television programs for Discovery Channel's Shark Week, including an appearance in Sharkman, in which Michael Rutzen attempts to learn how to hypnotize sharks, and in the show 10 Deadliest Sharks, where he describes the behavior of lemon sharks. He also made an appearance in 2008 on the Discovery Channel MythBusters, also during Shark week.
