= Eugenie Clark =

American ichthyologist, shark researcher and scientific scuba diver

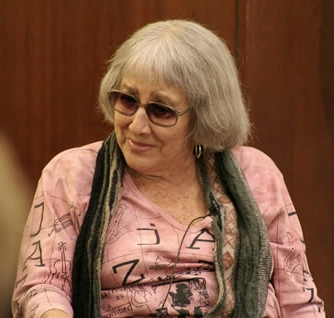
- Clark in 2011
- Born: May 4, 1922; New York City, New York, U.S.
- Died: February 25, 2015 (aged 92); Sarasota, Florida, U.S.
- Education: Hunter College (B.A.); New York University (M.A.), (Ph.D.)
- Spouses: Hideo "Roy" Umaki (m. 1942; div. 1947) Ilias Themistokles Konstantinu (m. 1950; div. 1967) Chandler Brossard (m. 1967; div. 1969) Igor Klatzo (m. 1970, divorced) Henry Yoshinobu Kon (m. 1997; died 2000)
- Children: Hera, Aya, Themistokles, and Nikolas
- Scientific career
- Fields: Ichthyology
- Workplaces: Mote Marine Laboratory; University of Maryland, College Park
- Notable students: Marianne K. Henderson

Eugenie Clark (May 4, 1922 – February 25, 2015), popularly known as The Shark Lady, was an American ichthyologist known for both her research on shark behavior and her study of fish in the order Tetraodontiformes. Clark was a pioneer in the field of scuba diving for research purposes. In addition to being regarded as an authority in marine biology, Clark was popularly recognized and used her fame to promote marine conservation.

== Early life and education ==
Eugenie Clark was born and raised in New York City. Her father, Charles Clark, died when Eugenie was almost two years old, and her mother, Yumico Motomi, later married Japanese restaurant owner Masatomo Nobu.

Clark attended elementary school in Woodside, Queens, and graduated from Bryant High School in Queens, New York. She was the only student of Japanese descent in her schools.

From an early age, Clark was passionate about marine science, with many of her school reports covering topics in marine biology. An initial visit to the New York Aquarium inspired Clark to return to the aquarium every Saturday thereafter, fascinated by marine animals. The work of naturalist William Beebe further inspired Clark to become an oceanographer.

== Academic and scientific life ==
Eugenie Clark received a Bachelor of Arts in zoology from Hunter College (1942). During summers, she studied at the University of Michigan Biological Station, and prior to graduate school, she worked for Celanese Corporation as a chemist. Eugenie initially sought to attend graduate school at Columbia University, but her application was rejected out of fear that she would eventually choose to leave her scientific career in order to focus on raising children. Undaunted, Clark went on to earn both a Master of Arts (1946) and Doctorate of Zoology (1950) from New York University. During her years of graduate study, Clark carried out research at the Scripps Institution of Oceanography in La Jolla, the American Museum of Natural History in New York, the Woods Hole Marine Biological Laboratory in Massachusetts, and at the Lerner Marine Laboratory in Bimini.

In 1949, under an Office of Naval Research program to undertake scientific research in Micronesia, Clark carried out fish population studies in Guam, the Marshall Islands, the Palau islands, the Northern Mariana Islands, and the Caroline Islands. After completing doctoral research, Clark received a Fulbright Scholarship to pursue ichthyological studies at the Marine Biological Station in Hurghada, on the northern Red Sea Coast of Egypt. These experiences were discussed in Clark's first book, Lady with a Spear (1953), the writing of which was supported in part by a Eugenie Saxton Memorial Fellowship and a Breadloaf Writers' Fellowship. The book was a popular success.

Anne and William H. Vanderbilt, fans of Lady with a Spear who owned an estate in southwestern Florida, invited the biologist to speak at a public school in Englewood, Florida, in 1954. After Clark delivered a presentation on Red Sea fish, the attendees revealed that they had encountered many similar animals in local waters and were interested in learning more about them. Subsequently, the Vanderbilts built a lab for Clark in the area. It was named the Cape Haze Marine Laboratory in 1955.

=== Work at Cape Haze ===
At the Cape Haze Marine Laboratory, Clark worked with a local fisherman named Beryl Chadwick, who was experienced in catching sharks. Chadwick was Clark's only assistant at the time of the lab's founding. The lab's first request for shark research came from John H. Hellen, director of the New England Institute for Medical Research. As the laboratory's activities began to be published in scientific journals, requests from other researchers began to pour into the lab. Researchers from around the world came to study in Cape Haze.

One of the visiting researchers at Cape Haze Laboratory was Sylvia Earle, who was then working on her dissertation research on algae at Duke University. Earle assisted Clark in creating a herbarium by depositing duplicate specimens into the laboratory's reference collection.

While at Cape Haze, Clark conducted a number of behavioral, reproductive, and anatomical experiments on sharks and other fish. She frequently scuba dived in the local waters, studying various organisms. On these dives, Clark often used the glass jar catching technique popularized by Connie Limbaugh, then the Chief Diver at Scripps Institution of Oceanography. These jars allowed Clark to transport unknown specimens back to the lab for further study.

The Cape Haze Laboratory moved to Siesta Key, Florida, in 1960. Scientists continued to visit the laboratory, including chemists from the Dow Chemical Company.

In 1962, Clark participated in the Israel South Red Sea Expedition, which set up a camp on one of the Eritrean islands of the Dahlak Archipelago. Her studies focused not only on sharks but also on other, mainly large, pelagic species.

In 1966, Clark left Cape Haze for a faculty position at the City University of New York. In 1968, she became an instructor at the University of Maryland, College Park. While at the University of Maryland, Clark received many accolades, including three fellowships, five scholarships, and six medals. Clark officially retired from the University of Maryland in 1999 but taught one class in the zoology department each semester for several years.

Clark returned to the Cape Haze Laboratory, now renamed the Mote Marine Laboratory, in 2000. She worked there as Senior Scientist, director emerita, and Trustee until her death in Sarasota, Florida, of lung cancer on February 25, 2015. Clark was an active researcher and diver throughout her entire life, conducting her last dive in 2014 and publishing its results in January 2015, with additional research still undergoing review at the time of her death.

== Personal life ==
Clark was married five times, the first four ending in divorce: Hideo "Roy" Umaki from 1942 to 1947 (first Japanese commercial pilot in the United States), Ilias Themistokles Konstantinu from 1950 to 1967, writer Chandler Brossard from 1967 to 1969, and Igor Klatzo in 1970. She was married to Henry Yoshinobu Kon from 1997 to his suicide in 2000.

== Legacy ==
Clark authored two books, Lady with a Spear (1953) and The Lady and the Sharks (1969), as well as over 175 scientific articles. She was the subject of several books, including Shark Lady and Adventures of the Shark Lady by Ann McGovern. Clark was an avid supporter of marine conservation and many of her popular publications and public appearances focused on dispelling assumptions about shark behavior and intelligence in an effort to prevent the killing of sharks and encourage the preservation of marine environments. Publications from within this body of work document that she was the first person to train sharks to press targets, as well as the first scientist to develop "test tube" babies in female fish. She also discovered that the Moses sole produces a natural shark repellent that, when released by the sole, causes the offending shark to back away and behave erratically, thrashing its head and stopping the attack. This natural repellant has since been employed by researchers aiming to prevent harmful interactions between sharks and humans. Clark's observation of numerous "sleeping" sharks during her research dives helped to prove sharks do not need to move in order to breathe. Clark documented these "sleeping" sharks were slowly pumping water over their gills with weak muscles. She noticed that the cave these sharks were found in had above average oxygen dissolved in the water, in which Clark hypothesized that it made it easier to breathe and potentially provide a narcotic effect on the sharks. Using this discovery, other studies have found similar "sleeping" patterns in other species of sharks. Over her decades of research, Clark conducted over 70 submersible dives and led more than 200 field research expeditions around the world. She worked on 24 television specials and helped create the first IMAX film.

=== Awards and honors ===
Clark received three honorary D.Sc. degrees from the University of Massachusetts, Long Island University, and the University of Guelph. She has been inducted into both the Florida Women's Hall of Fame and the Maryland Women's Hall of Fame. She was the 1987 recipient in the Science category of a NOGI, which is awarded annually by the Academy of Underwater Arts and Sciences and is the oldest, and considered to be the most prestigious award in the diving world. Clark has also received accolades from the National Geographic Society, the Explorers Club, the Underwater Society of America, the American Littoral Society, the Women Divers Hall of Fame, the American Society of Oceanographers. In 1975, she received the Gold Medal of the international Society of Woman Geographers for her studies of shark reproduction and behavior. She has been written about in many books, including The Shark Lady, by Ann McGovern.

Several species of fish have been named in her honor: Callogobius clarki (Goren), Sticharium clarkae (George and Springer), Enneapterygius clarkae (Holleman), Atrobucca geniae (Ben-Tuvia and Trewavas), and Squalus clarkae, also known as Genie's dogfish.

On May 4, 2022, on what would have been Clark's 100th birthday, the United States Postal Service honored her with a Forever stamp featuring a shark and Clark in diving gear.

== See also ==
- Robert Hueter
- Perry Webster Gilbert
