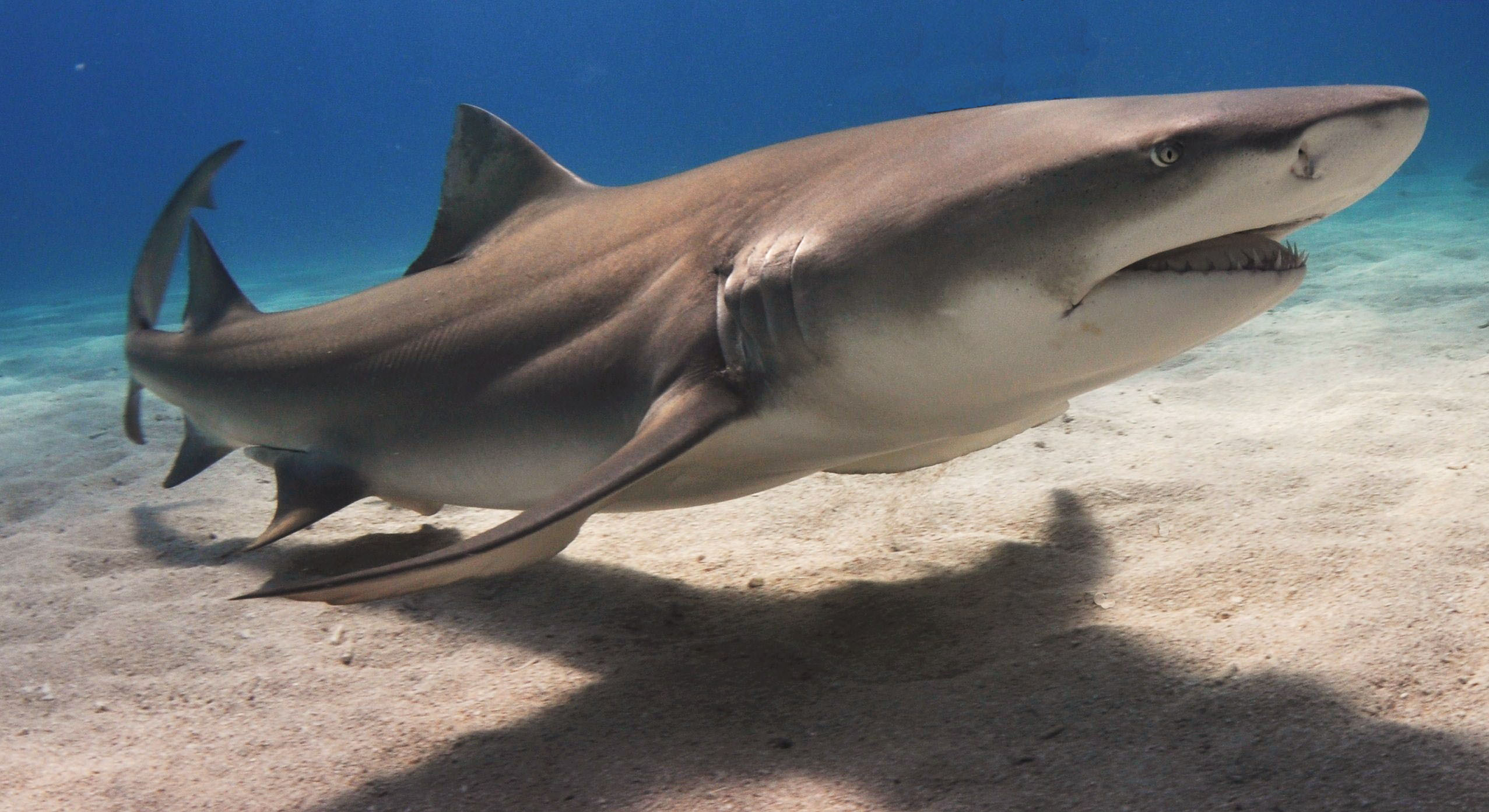

Conservation status
- Vulnerable (IUCN 3.1)
- CITES Appendix II

Scientific classification
- Kingdom: Animalia
- Phylum: Chordata
- Class: Chondrichthyes
- Subclass: Elasmobranchii
- Division: Selachii
- Order: Carcharhiniformes
- Family: Carcharhinidae
- Genus: Negaprion
- Species: N. brevirostris

Binomial name
- Negaprion brevirostris (Poey, 1868)
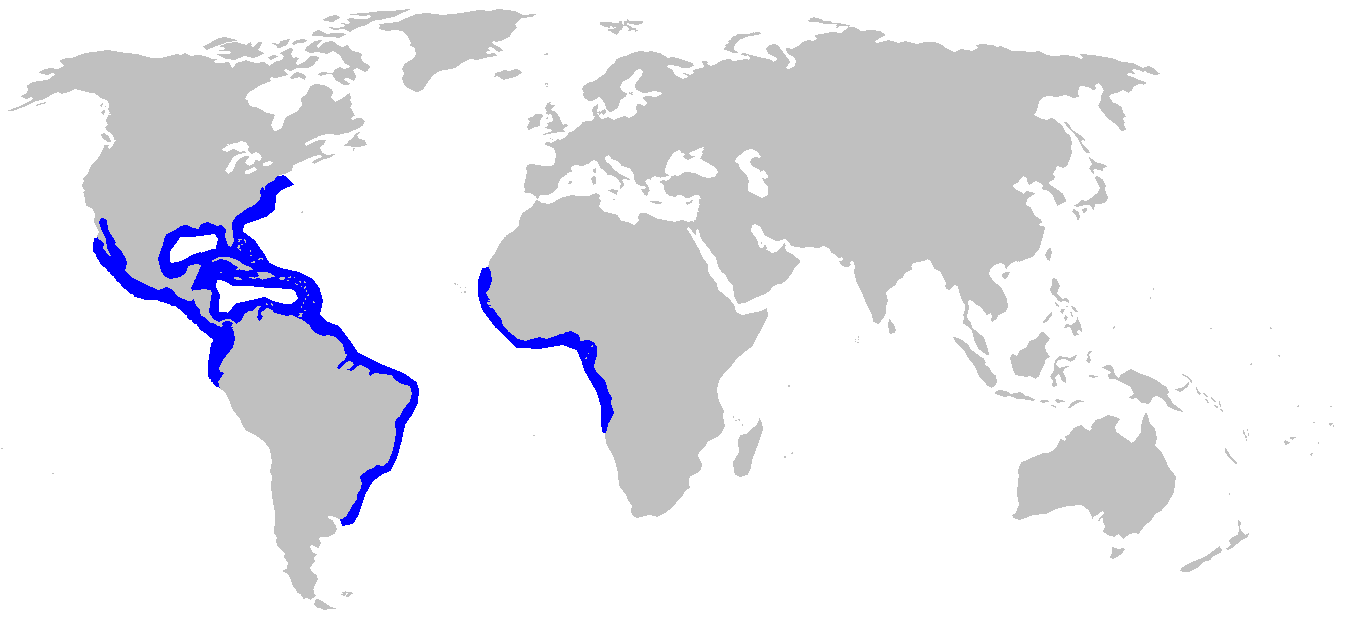
- Range of the lemon shark

Synonyms
- Carcharias fronto Jordan & Gilbert, 1882; Hypoprion brevirostris Poey, 1868

= Lemon shark =

Lemon shark Temporal range: 23–0 Ma Early Miocene-recent

Species of shark

The lemon shark (Negaprion brevirostris) is a species of requiem shark from the family Carcharhinidae, known for its yellowish skin, which inspires its common name.

The lemon shark is classified as a "vulnerable" species by the International Union for the Conservation of Nature.

Lemon sharks can grow to 3.4 m (11 ft) in length. They are often found in shallow subtropical waters and are known to inhabit and return to specific nursery sites for breeding. Often feeding at night, these sharks use electroreceptors to find their main source of prey, fish. Lemon sharks enjoy the many benefits of group living, such as enhanced communication, courtship, predatory behavior, and protection. This species gives birth to live young, and the females are polyandrous and have a biennial reproductive cycle. Lemon sharks are not thought to be a large threat to humans; only 10 bites have been recorded, none of which were life-threatening. The lemon shark's lifespan is unknown, but the typical shark is 25 to 30 years old.

In 2023, the oldest recorded lemon shark in captivity died at the age of 40 years.

== Name ==
In 1868, Felipe Poey was the first to name and describe the lemon shark. He originally called it Hypoprion brevirostris, but later reclassified the species as Negaprion brevirostris, which is the accepted scientific name today.

The lemon shark has also appeared in the scientific literature as Negaprion fronto and Carcharias fronto (Jordan and Gilbert, 1882), Carcharias brevirostris (Gunther, 1870), and Carcharhinus brevirostris (Henshall, 1891).

== Evolution ==
The earliest fossil remains of this species are known from the Early Miocene of Odisha (India), Peru, and Cuba. Fossils become more widespread in the Americas and western Africa from the Middle Miocene onward.

== Description ==
The lemon shark's yellow coloring serves as an excellent camouflage when swimming over the sandy seafloor in its coastal habitat.

The lemon shark commonly attains a length of 2.4 to 3.1 m (7.9 to 10.2 ft) and a weight up to 90 kg (200 lb) by adulthood, although sexual maturity is attained at 2.24 m (7.3 ft) in males and 2.40 m (7.9 ft) in females. The maximum recorded length and weight is 3.43 m (11.3 ft) and 183.7 kg (405 lb), respectively.

The lemon shark has a flattened head with a short, broad snout, and the second dorsal fin is almost as large as the first. Like all cartilaginous fishes, lemon sharks have electroreceptors concentrated in their heads, known as the ampullae of Lorenzini. These receptors detect electrical pulses emitted by potential prey and allow these nocturnal feeders to sense their prey in the dark.

Lemon sharks can be confused with bull sharks; the former have quite similarly sized first and second dorsal fins, whereas those of the latter are differently sized.

== Distribution ==
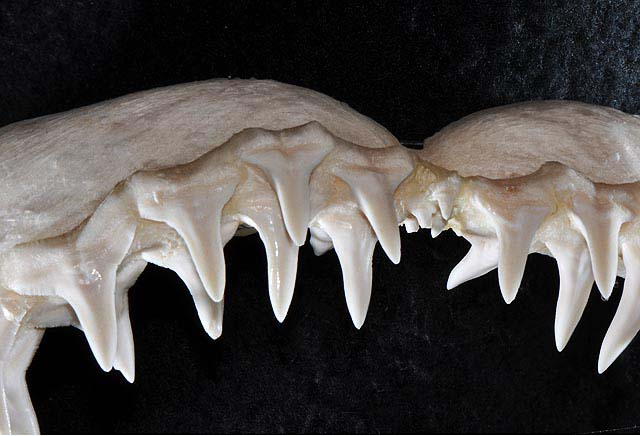
Lemon shark upper teeth

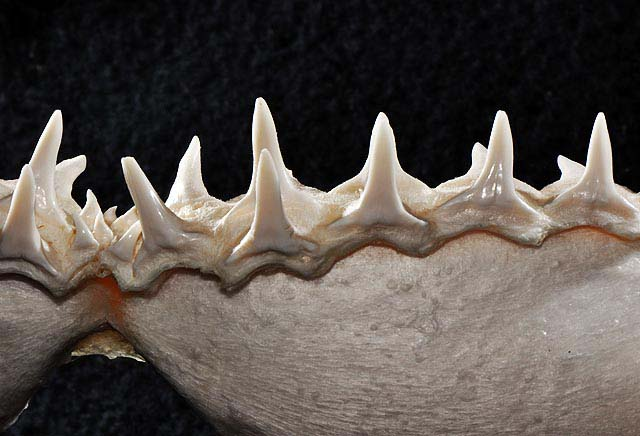
Lemon shark lower teeth

Lemon sharks are found from New Jersey to southern Brazil in the tropical western Atlantic Ocean. They also live off the coast of west Africa in the southeastern Atlantic. In addition, lemon sharks have been found in the eastern Pacific, from southern Baja California to Ecuador and in Cape Verde in Sal Island.

Although the lemon shark species is known for occupying the subtropical, shallow waters of coral reefs, mangroves, enclosed bays, and river mouths, they have also been found in the open ocean down to depths of 92 m (302 ft).

Lemon sharks have been observed swimming up rivers, but they do not appear to travel very far into fresh water. They are found in open water primarily during migrations, tending to stay along the continental and insular shelves for most of their lives.

== Habitat selection ==
Information about activity patterns and the use of space is important in understanding a species' behavioral ecology. Animals often make decisions about habitat use by evaluating their environment's abiotic conditions that serve as valuable indicators of good foraging sites or predator-safe locations. Lemon sharks select habitats in warm and shallow water with a rocky or sandy bottom.

The environmental temperature influences an individual's body temperature, which ultimately affects physiological processes such as growth and metabolism. Lemon sharks, therefore, select warm-water habitats to maintain optimal metabolic levels. They are believed to avoid areas with thick sea grasses because they make finding prey more difficult.

Lemon sharks tend to live in or near shallow-water mangroves, which are often the nursery areas of several species of fish. The data gathered about the characteristics of shark nursery areas are mostly based on coastal species, this is due to their occurrence in bays, estuaries, river deltas, and shallow coastal waters. One theory is that lemon sharks select mangrove habitats due to the abundance of prey that resides there, while another theory posits that mangroves provide a safe haven from adult lemon sharks that occasionally feed on juvenile sharks and are unable to enter the shallow waters.

Ontogenetic niche shifts, or changes in an animal's niche breadth or position, to deeper waters are known to occur in relation to a lemon shark's size. These changes occur due to the dramatic decrease in the risk of predation as body size increases. Habitat selection clearly depends on a variety of biological and environmental variables.

The mangrove areas that lemon sharks inhabit are often referred to as their nursery sites, which are best defined as the most common area sharks are encountered, the location sharks tend to remain at after birth or frequently return to, and the habitat used by shark groups repeatedly for several years. The nursery ground concept has been known and studied for at least a century. In addition, fossil evidence from 320 million years ago suggests that the use of shallow, coastal areas as pupping grounds is primitive.

Lemon sharks have proven to be an ideal model species to challenge the belief that all sharks are asynchronous, opportunistic predators due to their tendency to use nursery areas for an extended period of time. Lemon shark feeding behaviors are easy to determine because their well-defined home ranges are conducive to accurate calculations of both the amount and types of prey in the environment and diet of a lemon shark.

Lemon sharks feed at night and are mainly piscivorous, but they have been known to feed on crustaceans and benthic organisms. Intraspecific predation, or cannibalism, of juvenile lemon sharks by larger conspecifics has also been documented.

Rather than feeding randomly, lemon sharks display a high degree of preference for certain species and size of prey when environmental conditions are favorable.

Lemon sharks tend to prey on smaller sharks, bony fish, stingrays, mollusks, and birds, as well as types of catfish, mullet jacks, porcupine fish, and cowfish. They also tend to consume prey that it is more abundant and available. Lemon sharks feed selectively on species that are slower and more easily captured by using a stalking technique. For example, parrotfish and mojarras are common prey in the Bahamas because they use camouflage rather than an escape response and are vulnerable due to their stationary foraging behavior. Lemon sharks feed on prey that are intermediate in size compared to other available prey. This tendency can be explained by the tradeoff between the probability of capture and the profitability when it comes to prey size. The general trend in the foraging behavior of lemon sharks conforms to the optimal foraging theory, which suggests a positive relationship between prey selectivity and availability.

Rather than rolling on their sides to rip off chunks of prey, a lemon shark approaches its victim with speed, only to brake suddenly using its pectoral fins upon contact. The animal then jabs forward multiple times until it has a good grasp of its prey in its jaw and proceeds to shake its head from side to side until it tears off a chunk of flesh. A feeding frenzy, or large swarm of other sharks, then forms as the individuals sense the blood and bodily fluids released from the prey. Sounds of struggling prey also attract groups of sharks, suggesting they use sound detection for predation. Group feeding behavior such as pack hunting or communal scavenging was observed in a study in which pieces of the same stingray were found in the stomachs of several lemon shark individuals that were caught and examined.

== Social behavior ==
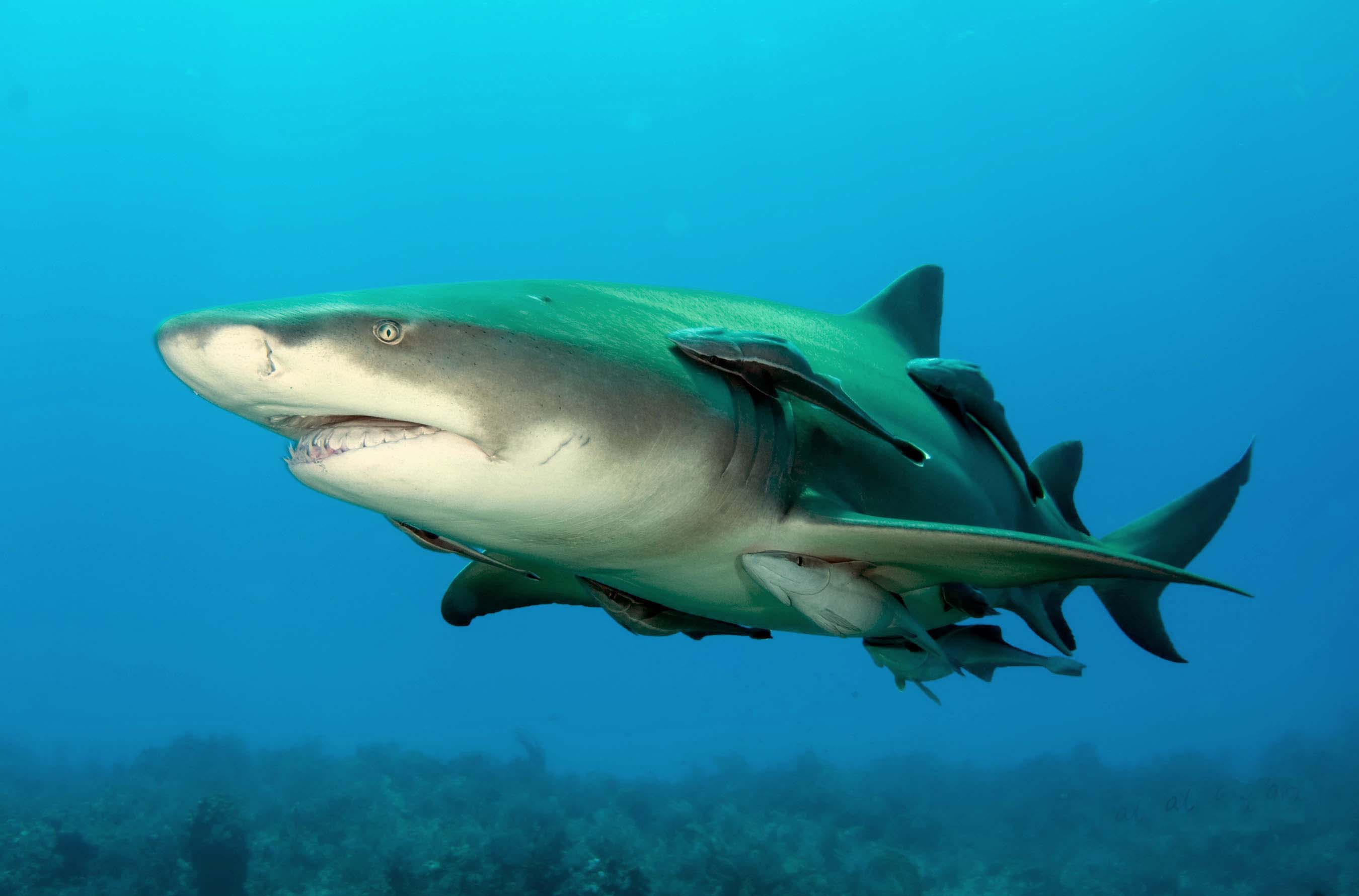
A lemon shark with many remoras clinging to its body

Many species of sharks, including the lemon shark, are known to be social, living in groups or loose aggregations.

A few benefits of group living are enhanced communication, courtship, predatory behavior, and protection. Group living and a preference for social interaction is thought to be important for the survival and success of juvenile lemon sharks. Up to twenty juveniles have been observed in groups of lemon sharks. Group living, however, comes with its costs, such as increased risk of disease, ease of parasite transmission, and competition for resources.

Lemon sharks are found in groups based on similar size. Passive sorting mechanisms such as its ontogenetic habitat shift have been postulated to contribute to the formation of groups organized based on size or sex. One exception to this behavior is that sharks less than a year old show no preference for groups of matched or unmatched size. One hypothesis for this finding is that it is beneficial for the small young lemon sharks to associate with the larger individuals because they have an easier time gathering information about the habitat regarding elements such as predators and local prey. Lemon shark groups form due to an active desire to be social rather than a simple attraction to the same limited resources such as the mangrove habitat and prey associated with such a habitat.

Many studies have related brain size with complex social behaviors in mammals and birds. The size of the lemon shark brain, which is comparable in relative mass to that of a mammal or bird, suggests that they can learn from social interactions, cooperate with other individuals, and have the potential to establish dominance hierarchies and stable social bonds.

== Reproduction ==
Lemon sharks congregate for reproduction at special mating grounds. Females give birth to their young in shallow nursery waters to which they are philopatric. Lemon shark young are known as pups and they tend to remain in the nursery area for several years before venturing into deeper waters. Lemon sharks are viviparous, meaning that the mother directly transfers nutrients to her young via a yolk-sac placenta and the young are born alive. Fertilization is internal and occurs after a male lemon shark holds a female, bites her, and inserts his clasper into her cloaca.

Female lemon sharks are polyandrous and sperm competition occurs due to their ability to store sperm in an oviducal gland for several months. Several studies suggest that polyandry in female lemon sharks has adapted out of convenience, rather than indirect genetic benefits to offspring. This type of polyandry is termed as convenience polyandry because females are believed to mate multiple times to avoid harassment by males.

Females have a biennial reproductive cycle, requiring a year for gestation and another year for oogenesis and vitellogenesis after parturition. Lemon sharks reach sexual maturity around 12–16 years of age and have low fecundity. Males tend to mature earlier than females. The maximum number of pups recorded in a litter is 18.

== Relationship with humans ==
This species of shark is among the best known in its behavior and ecology, mainly due to the work of Samuel Gruber at the University of Miami, who studied the lemon shark both in the field and in the laboratory from 1967. The population around the Bimini Islands in the western Bahamas, where Gruber's Bimini Biological Field Station is situated, is probably the best known of all shark populations.

The lemon shark is targeted by commercial and recreational fishers along the U.S. Atlantic Ocean, Caribbean, and in the eastern Pacific Ocean due to its prized meat, fins, and skin. Lemon shark skin may be used for leather and its meat can be consumed and is believed to be a delicacy in many cultures. Concern exists that over-fishing has led the lemon shark populations in the western north Atlantic and eastern Pacific Ocean to decline. It is considered vulnerable. Overfishing is the main threat to lemon sharks, with a 50% to 79% decrease in population observed over the past fifty years.

Lemon sharks do not represent a large threat to humans. The International Shark Attack File lists 10 unprovoked lemon shark bites, none of which were fatal.

== In popular culture ==
In the romantic comedy film Couples Retreat (2009), a pair of lemon sharks begin circling two of the characters, who are balancing a bucket of chum on a small floating platform. When the chum falls into the water, the characters are told that the sharks are not dangerous to humans, and that they should simply swim slowly away from the sharks and the chum.

== See also ==
- List of sharks

== Bibliography ==
- "Negaprion brevirostris". Integrated Taxonomic Information System.
- Froese, Rainer; Pauly, Daniel (eds.). "Negaprion brevirostris". FishBase. March 2005 version.
- "Scientists Fear Oceans on the Cusp Of a Wave of Marine Extinctions". Washington Post. 2005-08-22.
