= Robert Hueter =

American shark scientist

- Education: University of Miami (BS, MS); University of Florida (PhD)
- Scientific career
- Fields: Marine biology
- Workplaces: Mote Marine Laboratory
- Thesis: The organization of spatial vision in the juvenile lemon shark (Negaprion Brevirostris): retinotectal projection, retinal topography, and implications for the visual ecology of sharks (1988)

Robert Edward Hueter is an American marine biologist and Senior Scientist Emeritus at Mote Marine Laboratory in Sarasota, Florida. Previously, he was Director of the Center for Shark Research at Mote. More recently he served as Chief Scientist and then Senior Science Advisor for OCEARCH. He primarily studies sharks and has authored over 200 papers related to marine biology.

== Biography ==
He earned a bachelor's degree in biology from the University of Miami in 1974, followed by a master's degree from the same university in Marine Biology in 1980. He received a Ph.D. in Zoology from the University of Florida in 1988. Hueter initially joined Mote Marine Laboratory in 1988 as a postdoctoral scientist. As of 2001, he occupies the Perry W. Gilbert Chair in Shark Research at Mote.

From 2003 to 2012, he helped lead research off the coast of the Yucatán Peninsula that found the largest aggregation of whale sharks ever discovered.

In 2015, he was part of an expedition to study sharks in Cuban waters alongside Cuban scientists that was featured on an episode of Discovery Channel's Shark Week called "Tiburones: The Sharks of Cuba".

From 1997 to 2021, he served on the Atlantic Highly Migratory Species Advisory Panel for the National Oceanic and Atmospheric Administration.

Dr. Hueter served as Chief Science Advisor from 2017 to 2020 for the nonprofit research and education organization OCEARCH and since 2020 has been employed by OCEARCH as the organization's Chief Scientist. His current work with OCEARCH is focused on multidisciplinary studies of the white shark in the Northwest Atlantic.

== Honors and awards ==
In 2007, he received a Lifetime Achievement Award in Conservation from Sarasota County, Florida. He received the Eugenie Clark Scientific Explorers Award from Mote Marine Laboratory in 2008. He was president of the American Elasmobranch Society in 1993 and served on the AES Board of Directors for more than a decade.

== See also ==
- Eugenie Clark
- Perry Webster Gilbert
