= Biological specimen =

Material from an organism used for biological research

Biological specimens in an elementary school science lab

A biological specimen (also called a biospecimen) is a biological laboratory specimen held by a biorepository for research, education, or diagnostics. Such a specimen would be taken by sampling so as to be representative of any other specimen taken from the source of the specimen. When biological specimens are stored, ideally they remain equivalent to freshly-collected specimens for the purposes of research.

Human biological specimens are stored in a type of biorepository called a biobank, and the science of preserving biological specimens is most active in the field of biobanking.

== Quality control ==
Setting broad standards for quality of biological specimens was initially an underdeveloped aspect of biobank growth. There is currently discussion on what standards should be in place and who should manage those standards. Since many organizations set their own standards and since biobanks are necessarily used by multiple organizations and typically are driven towards expansion, the harmonization of standard operating procedures for lab practices are a high priority. The procedures have to be evidence-based and will change with time as new research and technology becomes available.

=== Policy makers ===
Some progress for the creation of policy-making organizations include the National Cancer Institute's 2005 creation of the Office of Biobanking and Biospecimen Research (OBBR) and the annual Biospecimen Research Network Symposia. The International Society for Biological and Environmental Repositories, International Agency for Research on Cancer, Organisation for Economic Co-operation and Development, and the Australasian Biospecimen Network have also proposed policies and standards. In 2008 AFNOR, a French standardization organization, published the first biobank-specific quality standard. Aspects of ISO 9000 have been applied to biobanks.

=== Quality goals ===
Quality criteria for specimens depends on the study being considered and there is not a universal standard specimen type. DNA integrity is an important factor for studies which involve whole genome amplification. RNA integrity is critical for some studies and can be assessed by gel electrophoresis. Also biobanks, which do specimen storage, cannot take full responsibility for specimen integrity, because before they take custody of samples someone must collect and process them and effects such as RNA degradation are more likely to occur from delayed sample processing than inadequate storage.

== Samples stored ==
Biorepositories store various types of specimens. Different specimens are useful for different purposes.

Biobank specimens
specimen	uses	extraction technique	storage	characteristics
cheek tissue	DNA profiling	buccal swab		participants can collect themselves; can be collected by mail; so easy to collect that informed consent may be insufficiently addressed
whole blood		venipuncture		requires phlebotomist to collect
Dried blood spot	gives high quality DNA and RNA	Fingerstick	stores easily for years at room temperature	
organ tissue	gives high quality DNA, RNA, Mitochondrial DNA, and source of disease	Biopsy		many uses shared with blood; also suitable for proteomic analysis; may be difficult to obtain
Plasma	limited DNA and RNA content	Blood plasma fractionation		requires phlebotomist to collect
Urine	marker for some diagnostic tests	Urination		non-invasive
Feces	marker for some diagnostic tests	Stool sample		non-invasive
Skin	Mostly used by forensic teams investigating criminal cases			in criminal cases, collected without consent of donor
Hair	Mostly used by forensic teams investigating criminal cases	Hair analysis		in criminal cases, collected without consent of donor

== Storage techniques ==
Many specimens in biobanks are cryopreserved. Other specimens are stored in other ways.

== Techniques associated with biobanks ==
Some of the laboratory techniques associated with biological specimen storage include phenol-chloroform extraction, PCR, and RFLP.

== See also ==
- Zoological specimen
- Botanical specimen
