= Howard G. Crowell Jr. =

United States Army general

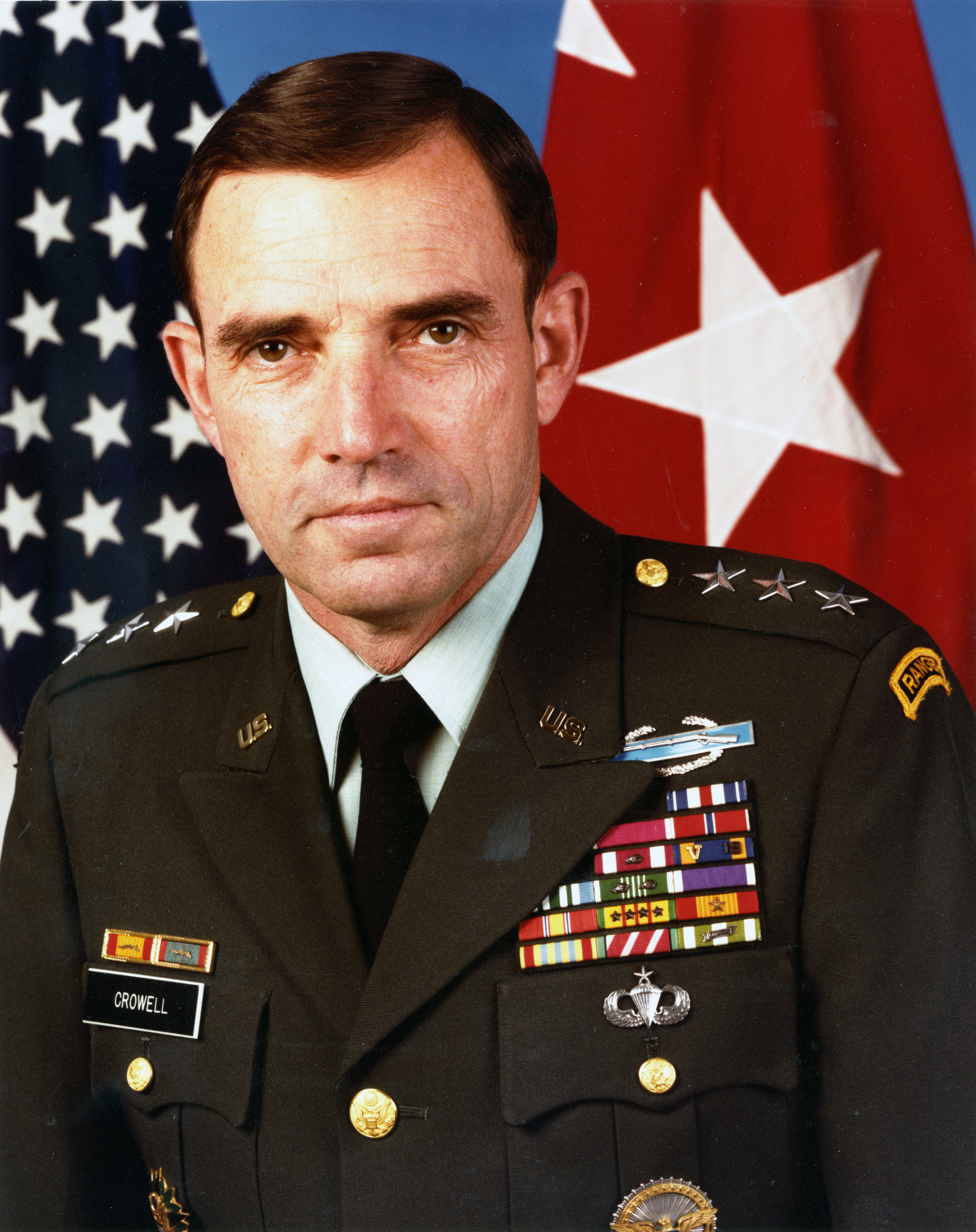
- LTG Howard G. Crowell Jr. Chief of Staff, European Command
- Born: September 2, 1932 (age 94); New Bedford, Massachusetts, U.S.
- Military career
- Allegiance: United States of America
- Branch: United States Army
- Service years: 1954-1988
- Rank: Lieutenant General
- Commands: Chief of Staff, United States European Command
- Awards: Defense Distinguished Service Medal; Army Distinguished Service Medal; Silver Star; Legion of Merit; Bronze Star; Meritorious Service Medal; Air Medal; Purple Heart

Howard Gardner Crowell Jr. (born September 2, 1932) is a retired American Army Lieutenant General and former Chief of Staff of the United States European Command. He retired in 1988. He currently resides in Sarasota, Florida where he sits on many boards and amongst them, the treasurer of the Mote Marine Laboratory.

== Awards and decorations ==
Combat Infantryman Badge
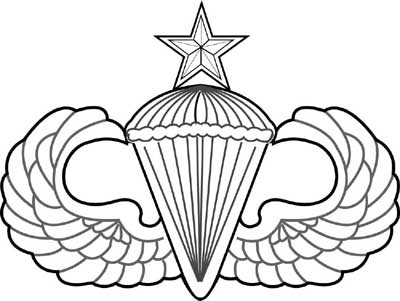
Senior Parachutist Badge
Ranger Tab
Secretary of Defense Identification Badge
Army Staff Identification Badge

Defense Distinguished Service Medal
Army Distinguished Service Medal
Silver Star
Legion of Merit
Bronze Star
Meritorious Service Medal with oak leaf cluster
Air Medal with valor device and award numeral 18
Joint Service Commendation Medal
Army Commendation Medal with two oak leaf clusters
Purple Heart
National Defense Service Medal
Vietnam Service Medal with four campaign stars
Vietnam Gallantry Cross with one bronze star
Vietnam Armed Forces Honor Medal
Vietnam Staff Service Medal
Vietnam Gallantry Cross Unit Citation
Vietnam Civil Actions Unit Citation
Vietnam Campaign Medal
