= 115 Battalion =

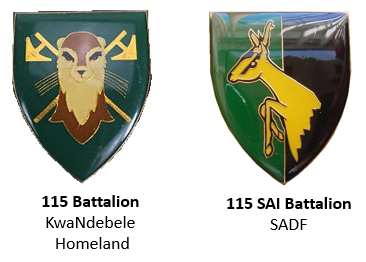
- 115 Battalion and 115 SAI Battalion emblems
- Active: 1984-1994
- Country: South Africa
- Branch: South African Army
- Type: Motorised infantry
- Part of: South African Army Infantry Corps
- Garrison/HQ: Siyabuswa
- Motto(s): Kumuswa Ezivusako (Protect what is yours) for 115 Battalion and “Praesto” (Excel) for 115 SAI Battalion
- Equipment: Buffel APC, Samil 20

Insignia
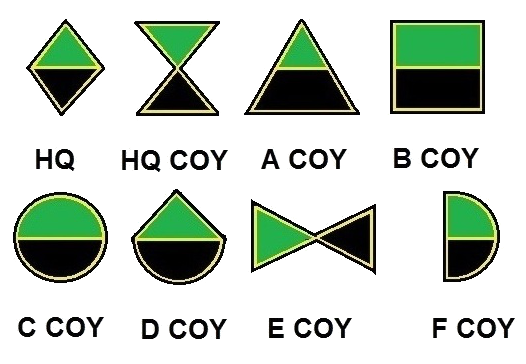
- Company level insignia

- SA Motorised Infantry beret bar circa 1992: SA Motorised Infantry beret bar

115 South African Infantry Battalion was a motorised infantry unit of the South African Army.

== History ==
=== Origin of the black battalions ===
In the late 1970s the South African government had abandoned its opposition to arming black soldiers.

By early 1979, the government approved a plan to form a number of regional African battalions, each with a particular ethnic identity, which would either serve in their homelands or under regional SADF commands. This led to the formation of 115 Battalion for the Ndebele and the planned KwaNdebele homeland in 1984.

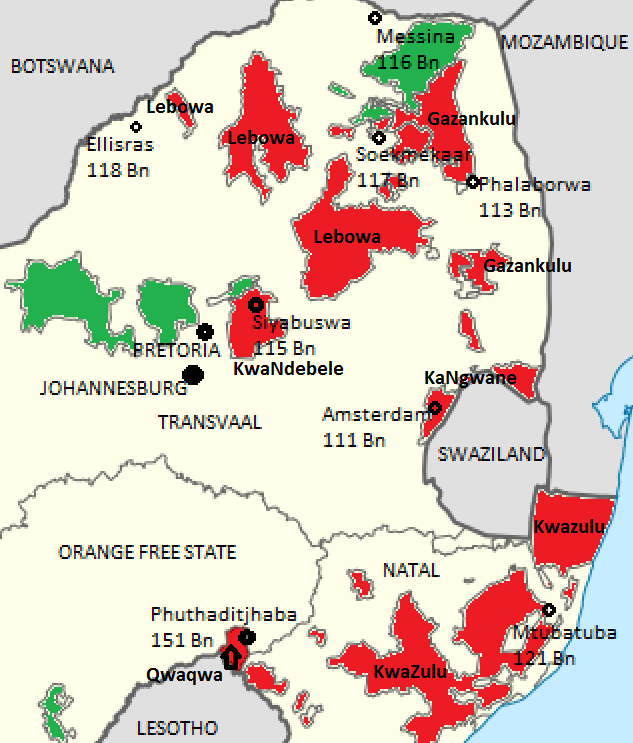
Location of the 100 Battalions in relation to their respective homelands

=== Development of the KwaNdebele Defence Force ===
115 Battalion was raised in 1985 and initially based on the farm named Shenandoah near Siyabuswa (The intended capital of KwaNdebele), part of the then Eastern Transvaal. Troops for 115 SA Battalion were recruited from the self-governing territory of KwaNdebele. The Battalion was intended to form the beginning of an armed forces for this homeland, but weak local support for independence from South Africa eventually halted the idea.

=== 115 redesignated as a SAI ===
115 Battalion therefore remained a SADF unit and resorted under the command of Group 15 from Pretoria.

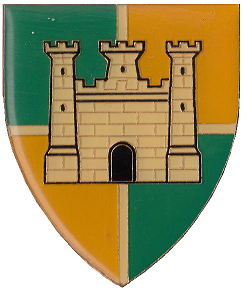
SADF Group 15 emblem

=== Disbandment ===
115 SAI Battalion disbandment process start around 2000 and some members were assimilated into the new SANDF.

Within the motorised environment was also Specialised Infantry Capability Composite Company named Sierra, boasting Equistrian, Motorcycle and Canine platoon, which was assimilated and centralised at Potchefstroom's 12 SAI Bn.

Other leadership grouping and members formed part of the grouping that resuscitated VIP Protection as well as guards of honour and hence the Establishment or Renaming of this grouping and unit that is now known as National Ceremonial Guards.

And the rest were reposted within other units under command of SA Army HQ as well as SAAF's Air Force Gymnasium.

== Insignia ==
115 Battalion's badge was initially designed for its role in the KwaNdebele Defence Force. The axes and otter are symbols of the Ndebele people. The redesigned 115 SAI Battalion badge however removed any direct connotation to the Ndebele tribe and was opened up as a multi-ethnic unit while the South African Infantry colours was introduced.

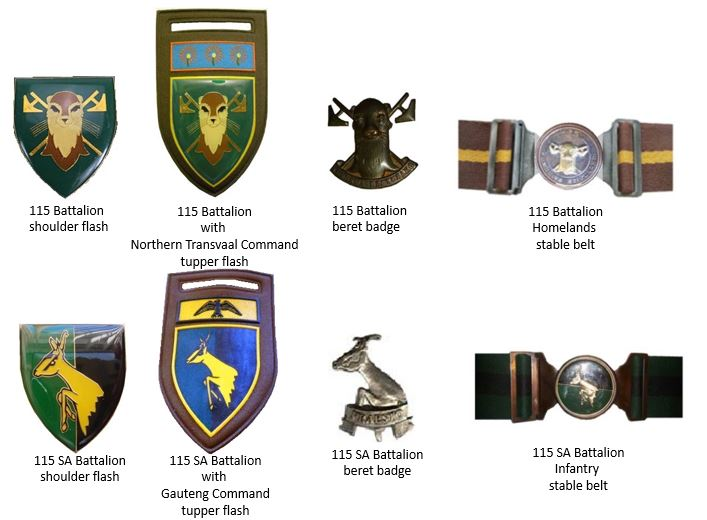
Kwandebele and SADF eras 115 Battalion insignia

It's "Kuvuswa Ezivusako" not Kumuswa.
