= Keith F. Otterbein =

Dr. Keith F. Otterbein (1936–2015) was an Emeritus Professor of Anthropology at the University at Buffalo (SUNYAB), in the United States.

Dr. Otterbein was a past president of the Human Relations Area Files and a frequent contributor to cross-cultural research, primarily in warfare related topics.

Otterbein is the author of How War Began (2004), in which he explored the origins of warfare in human society.

He died on June 17, 2015, at age 79.

== Publications ==
=== Books ===
- The Andros Islanders: A Study of Family Organization in the Bahamas, Lawrence, University of Kansas Press, 1966
- The Evolution of War: A Cross-Cultural Study, HRAF Press, New Haven, 1970 (3rd Ed. 1989)
- Comparative Cultural Analysis: An Introduction to Anthropology, New York, Holt, Rinehart and Winston, 1972 (2nd Ed. 1977)
- Changing House Types in Long Bay Cays: The Evolution of Folk Housing in an Out Island Bahamian Community, HRAFlex Book No. SW1 001, New Haven, Human Relations Area Files Press, 1986
- The Ultimate Coercive Sanction: A Cross Cultural Study of Capital Punishment, New Haven, Human Relations Area Files Press, 1986
- How War Began, 2004, Texas A&M University Press, College Station, 2004
- The Anthropology of War, Long Grove, Waveland Press, 2009

=== Articles ===
- The Evolution of Zulu Warfare, 1964, Kansas Journal of Sociology.
- Internal War: A Cross-Cultural Study, 1968, American Anthropologist.
- Higi Armed Combat, 1978, Southwestern Journal of Anthropology.
- Killing of Captured Enemies: A Cross-Cultural Study, 2000 Current Anthropology.
