= International Society for Biological and Environmental Repositories =

The International Society for Biological and Environmental Repositories (ISBER) is a professional society of individuals and organizations involved in biospecimen banking. Its main activities include creating educational and training opportunities, providing an online forum service, showcasing related products and services, and creating opportunities for networking. It also has published works.

== Membership ==
Membership includes organizations and individuals from over 30 countries involved in long-term preservation and storage of animal, environmental, human, microorganism culture, museum, and plant/seed collections. A complete list of members is available on the ISBER website.

== Meetings ==
ISBER holds one international meeting each year. Lectures, workshops, poster presentations, and working group discussions focus on technical issues and challenges such as quality assurance and control, regulations, human subject privacy and confidentiality issues, and provide information about sources of equipment and expertise.

=== ISBER Annual Meeting Locations ===
- May 7-10, 2019 - Shanghai, China
- May 20-24, 2018 - Dallas, TX, USA
- May 9-12, 2017 - Toronto, ONT, Canada
- May 20–24, 2014 - Orlando, FL, USA
- 2013 - Sydney, NSW, Australia
- 2012 - Vancouver, BC, Canada
- 2011 - Arlington, VA, USA
- 2010 - Rotterdam, SH, Netherlands
- 2009 - Portland, OR, USA
- 2008 - Bethesda, MD, USA
- 2007 - Singapore
- 2006 - Bethesda, MD, USA
- 2005 - Bellevue, WA, USA
- 2004 - New York, NY, USA

== Best Practices ==
The ISBER Best Practices are publications periodically reviewed and revised to reflect advances in research and technology. The fourth edition (2018) of the Best Practices builds on the foundation established in the first, second, and third editions which were published in 2005, 2008, and 2012 respectively. The fifth edition is currently being written.

=== Current Best Practices ===
ISBER Best Practices: Recommendations for Repositories provides repository professionals with standardized guidelines for the management of biobank specimen collections and repositories. The most current version of the ISBER Best Practices was published in Biopreservation and Biobanking (BIO), February 2018 issue.

== Biorepository Proficiency Testing Program ==
Developed in collaboration with the Integrated Biobank of Luxembourg (IBBL), the Biorepository Proficiency Testing Program is designed to allow biorepositories to assess the accuracy of their quality control assays and characterization of biospecimens. Participants can compare their results with those obtained in other laboratories and can identify testing issues that may be related to individual staff performance or calibration of instrumentation used in biospecimen quality control. The program provides guidance to biorepositories so they can take appropriate remedial action to be in compliance with ISO/IEC 17043:2010, providing a necessary External Quality Assessment tool for biorepositories who wish to seek accreditation (ISO 17025, CLIA or equivalent).
