= American Elasmobranch Society =

Organization

The American Elasmobranch Society (AES) is an international learned society devoted to the scientific study of chondrichthyans (sharks, skates, rays and chimaeras).

Founded in 1983, it is the world’s oldest and largest professional society devoted to the study. As of 2022, the society had around 500 members.
