= Lerner Marine Laboratory =

Research station in Bimini, Bahamas

The Lerner Marine Laboratory was a research station on the island of North Bimini, the Bahamas, operated by the American Museum of Natural History (AMNH) from 1948 until 1975. The laboratory was named for AMNH trustee Michael Lerner. The station was located on the edge of a lagoon, with passages to the open ocean to the west, giving access to the Gulf Stream, and to the Great Bahama Bank to the east. The station provided housing for ten visiting scientists (in 1960). The station eventually acquired a 63-foot-long (19 m) research vessel, shark pens, and a building with eleven laboratories. Close to 150 scientists conducted research at the station in 1968.
