= Mote Marine Laboratory =

Non-profit organization in the USA

- Interactive map of Mote Marine Laboratory
- 27°22′49.8″N 82°27′06.8″W
- Date opened: 1955; 71 years ago
- Location: Sarasota, Florida
- Land area: 10.5 acres (4.2 ha)
- Floor space: 146,000 sq ft (13,600 m^{2})
- No. of species: 500
- Volume of largest tank: 400,000 US gal (1,500,000 L)
- Total volume of tanks: 1,000,000 US gal (3,800,000 L)
- Annual visitors: 333,661 (2017)
- Memberships: Association of Zoos and Aquariums
- Director: Michael P. Crosby
- Public transit: Breeze Transit
- Website: www.mote.org

Mote Marine Laboratory is an independent, nonprofit, marine research organization based on City Island in Sarasota, Florida, with additional campuses in eastern Sarasota County, Boca Grande, Florida, and the Florida Keys. Founded in 1955 by Eugenie Clark in Placida, Florida, it was known as the Cape Haze Marine Laboratory until 1967. The laboratory aims to advance marine science and education, supporting conservation and sustainable use of marine resources. The laboratory also runs the Mote Science Education Aquarium (Mote SEA) located at 225 University Town Center, a public aquarium which also showcases its research for the public.

== History ==
The laboratory, founded by Eugenie Clark in 1955 in Placida, Florida, was previously known as the Cape Haze Marine Laboratory until its 1967 renaming in honor of the major benefactors: William R. Mote, his wife, Lenore, and his sister, Betty Mote Rose. Early research was focused on sharks and other fish. Since 1960, it has been based in Sarasota, Florida, and has been located on City Island since 1978.

The laboratory celebrated its 55th anniversary in 2010 and was recognized for its marine science with a resolution in the Florida House and Senate during March 2010. In March 2010, Eugenie Clark was inducted into the Florida Women's Hall of Fame. When the laboratory celebrated its 60th anniversary in 2015, it unveiled its first multi-year, comprehensive fundraising effort, Oceans of Opportunity: the Campaign for Mote Marine Laboratory. Clark was still working as senior scientist, director emerita, and trustee at the laboratory when she died in February 2015.

As of 2017, the laboratory employed more than 200 staff members, including Ph.D. scientists conducting research through more than 20 research programs on coral health and disease, chemical and physical ecology, phytoplankton ecology, ocean acidification, marine, and freshwater aquaculture, fisheries habitat ecology, stranding investigations, ecotoxicology, sharks and rays conservation research, fisheries ecology and enhancement, coral reef monitoring and assessment, coral reef restoration, environmental health, ocean technology, marine immunology, benthic ecology, marine biomedical research, environmental forensics, sea turtle conservation and research, manatee research, and dolphin research. In partnership of the Chicago Zoological Society, the laboratory conducts the world's longest-running study of a wild dolphin population.

Since 1978, the laboratory has expanded to include a 10.5-acre (4.2 ha) campus in Sarasota, the Elizabeth Moore International Center for Coral Reef Research and Restoration on Summerland Key, a public exhibit in Key West, a Boca Grande outreach office, and the Mote Aquaculture Research Park in eastern Sarasota County. In addition to staff members, the laboratory has about 1,000 volunteers.

== Mote Science Education Aquarium ==
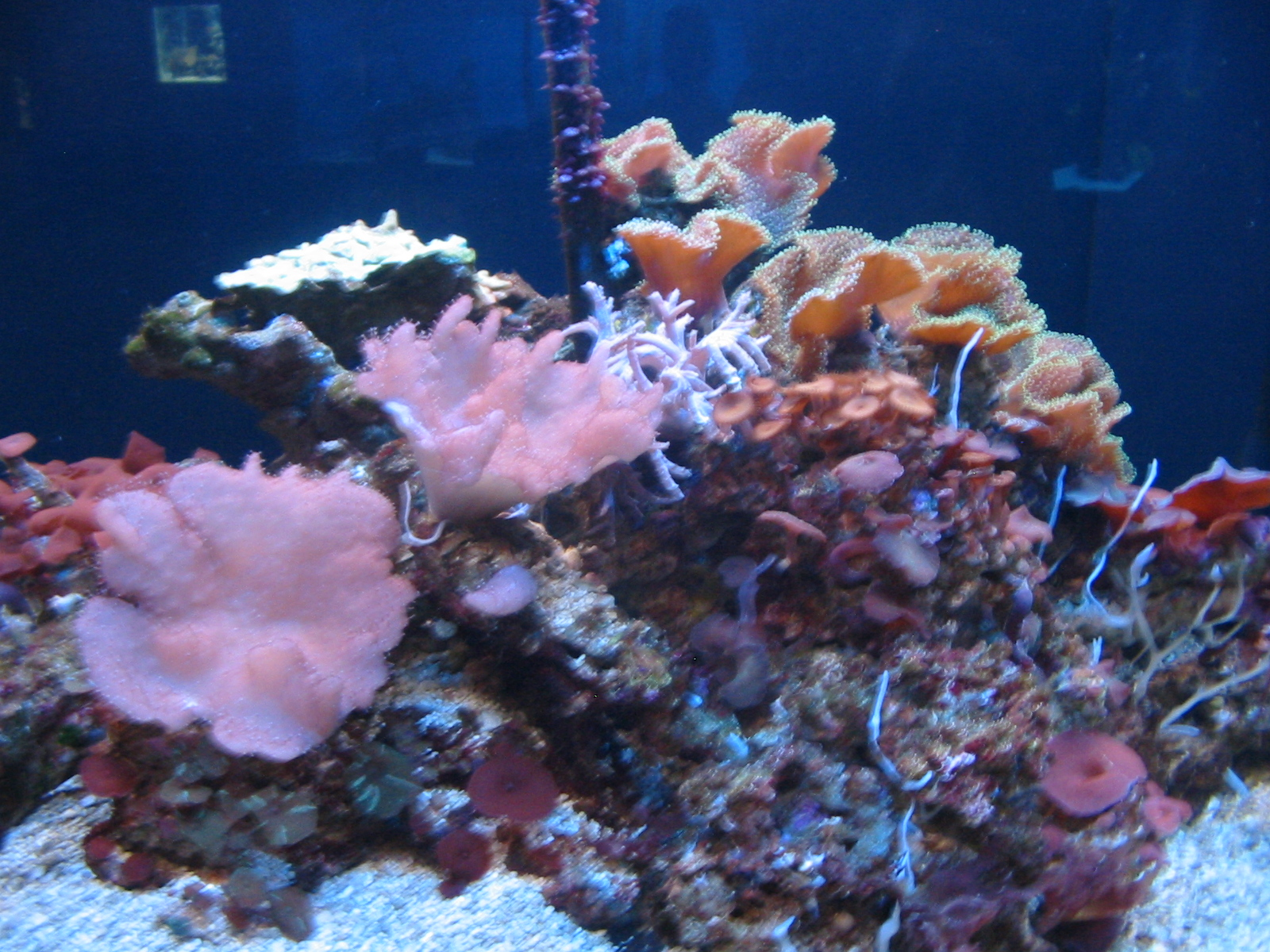
Coral display at Mote Marine Laboratory

The aquarium serves as the laboratory's public outreach arm, showcasing over 100 marine species, with a focus on those studied by staff scientists and their ecosystems. The aquarium is accredited by the Association of Zoos and Aquariums, which accredits qualified facilities based on a rigorous application and inspection process focusing on animal care, conservation, and science, facilities, and more.

The original aquarium opened in 1980 on City Island in Sarasota Bay to display sharks, manatees, sea turtles, seahorses, rays, skates, and invertebrates, including cuttlefish, octopuses, sea jellies, anemones, and corals. Special exhibits have included "Otters and Their Waters" and "The Teeth Beneath: The Wild World of Gators, Crocs, and Caimans," which features animals found in the watershed, including North American river otters, American alligators, and spectacled caimans. A special exhibit "Oh Baby! Life Cycles of the Seas" deals with marine courtship and reproduction and features the offspring of multiple species and their early-life survival challenges through an interactive game, a baby shark touch tank, and other features. The aquarium includes windows into working laboratories and interactive exhibits designed to make science accessible for all ages.

In 2020, the Mote Aquarium announced that it was moving to a new 110,000 sq ft (10,000 m^{2}) facility adjacent to University Town Center. The new aquarium opened in October 2025.

== Education ==
The education, aquarium, and outreach division of the laboratory includes a marine science school and public programs for all ages. The laboratory also offers internships, summer camps, school visits, field trips, on-demand learning experiences, an annual special lecture series featuring staff scientists and other marine experts, and a digital-learning program called SeaTrek.TV, which connects staff educators to students and other audiences via live videoconferencing, often using common computer programs and service, making scientific lessons accessible to classrooms across the U.S. and abroad. The laboratory also provides enhanced adult learning programs such as professional development workshops for teachers, and multiple aquarium tanks are maintained at other southwest Florida facilities, including at the Sarasota–Bradenton International Airport.

== Library ==
A library has existed at the laboratory since its beginning in Cape Haze.

For more than 35 years, the Arthur Vining Davis Library and Archives has been providing resources, reference materials, and research publications at the laboratory. Its collections are maintained to support marine and environmental research and education. In addition to print and archival collections, the library maintains searchable online, open-access institutional repositories of staff publications, institutional papers, and items from historical collections. The library and archives are open to the public for study and exploration; however, appointments may be required.

The library is a member of the International Association of Aquatic and Marine Science Libraries and Information Centers (IAMSLIC), an association of individuals and organizations interested in library and information science, especially as these are applied to the recording, retrieval, and dissemination of knowledge and information in all aspects of aquatic and marine sciences and their allied disciplines.

== Commercial programs ==
From 2006 to 2014, the laboratory produced "Mote caviar" (Siberian malossol osetra) from Siberian sturgeons at Mote Aquaculture Research Park in eastern Sarasota County as part of a demonstration of sustainable eco-sensitive aquaculture. On November 24, 2014, the caviar production operation was sold to Southeast Venture Holdings, LLC (Seven Holdings). Meanwhile, the laboratory continued to own the entire 200-acre research park and continued its sustainable aquaculture and aquaponics research, emphasizing a range of goals from eco-friendly food production to restocking wild fish populations.

== Gallery of displays ==
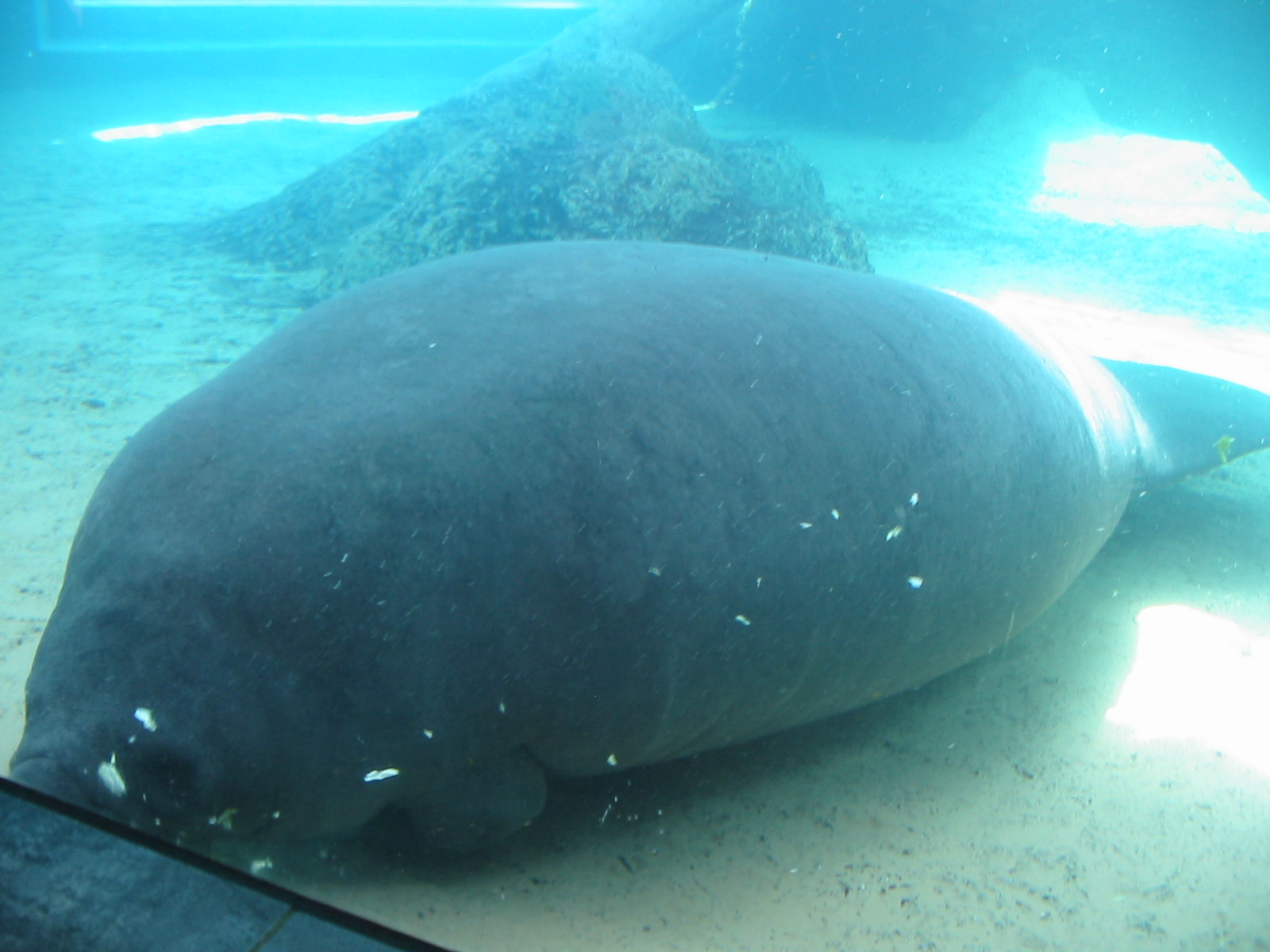
Manatee

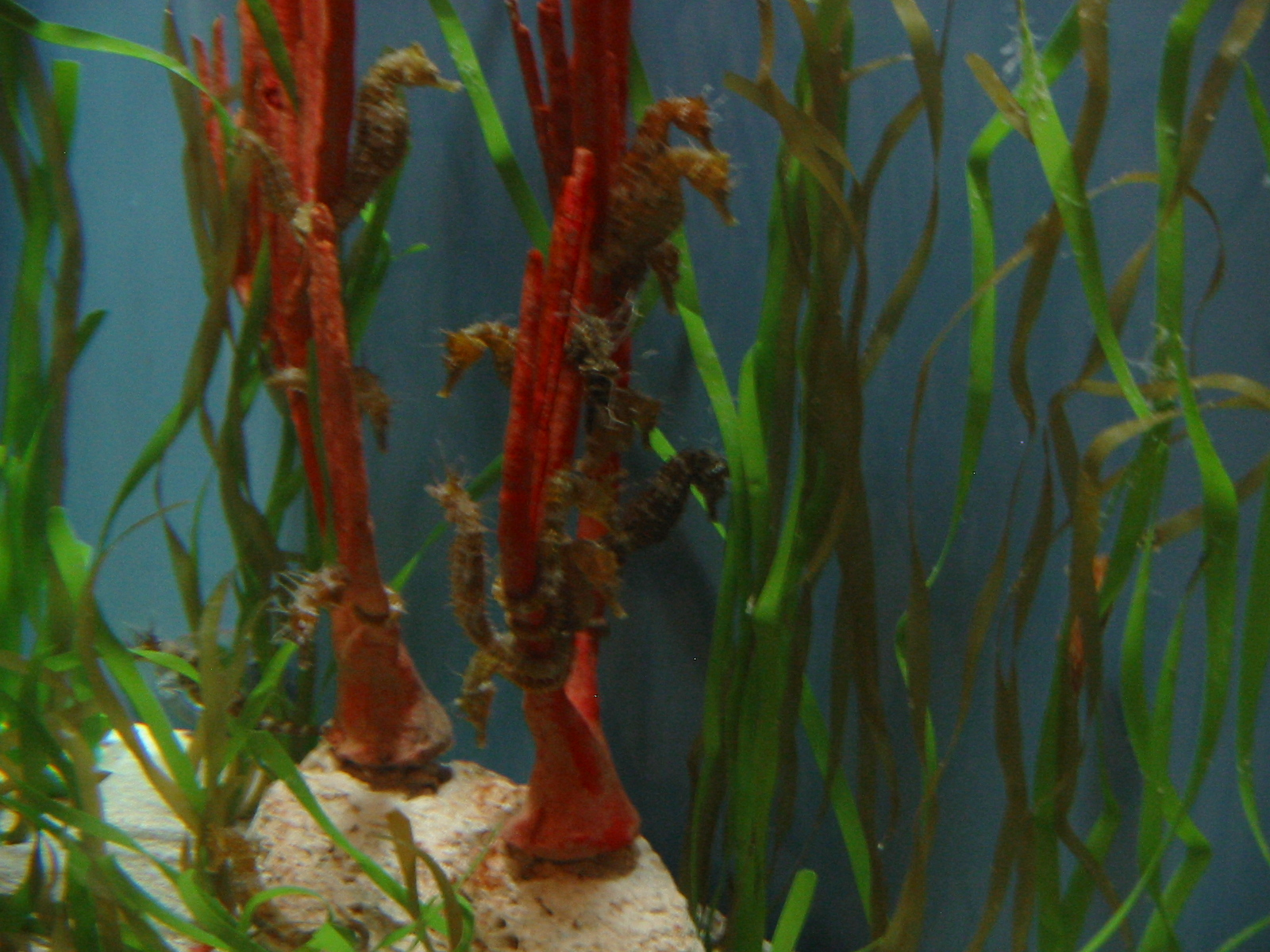
Seahorses

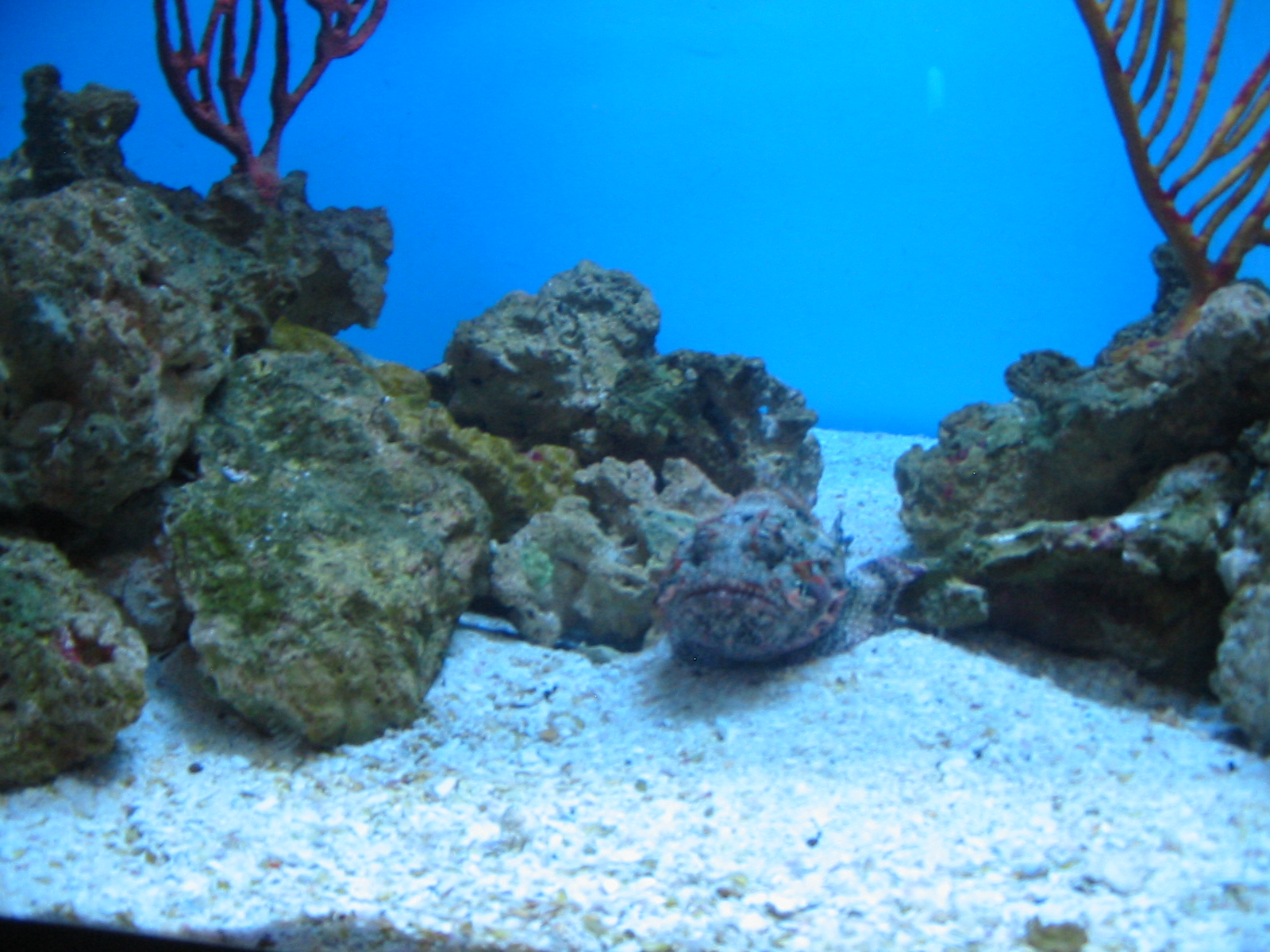
Stone fish

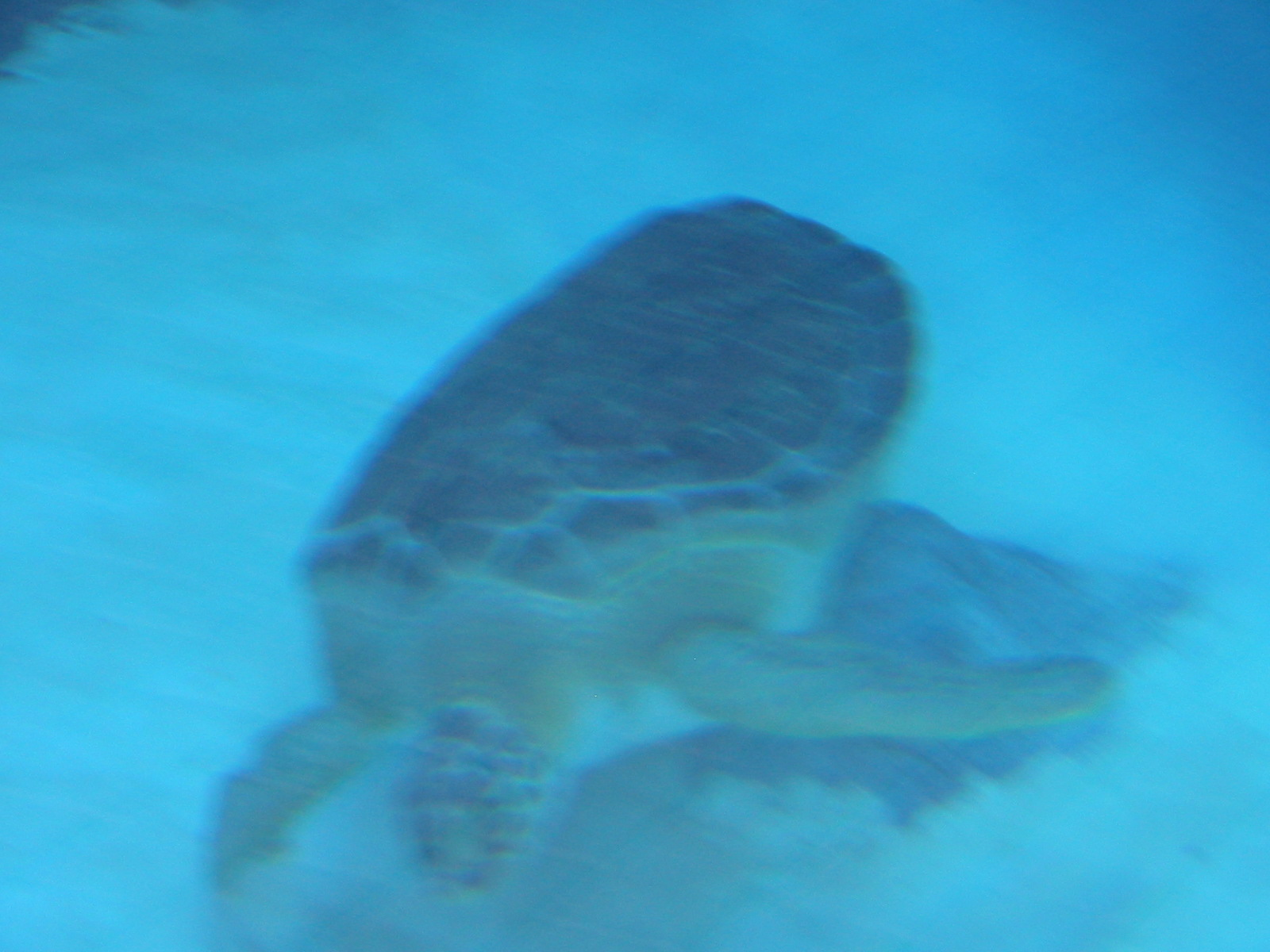
"Edgar", a blind loggerhead sea turtle, who died January 2011

== See also ==
- Robert Hueter
