= Shark culling =

Sanctioned killings of sharks

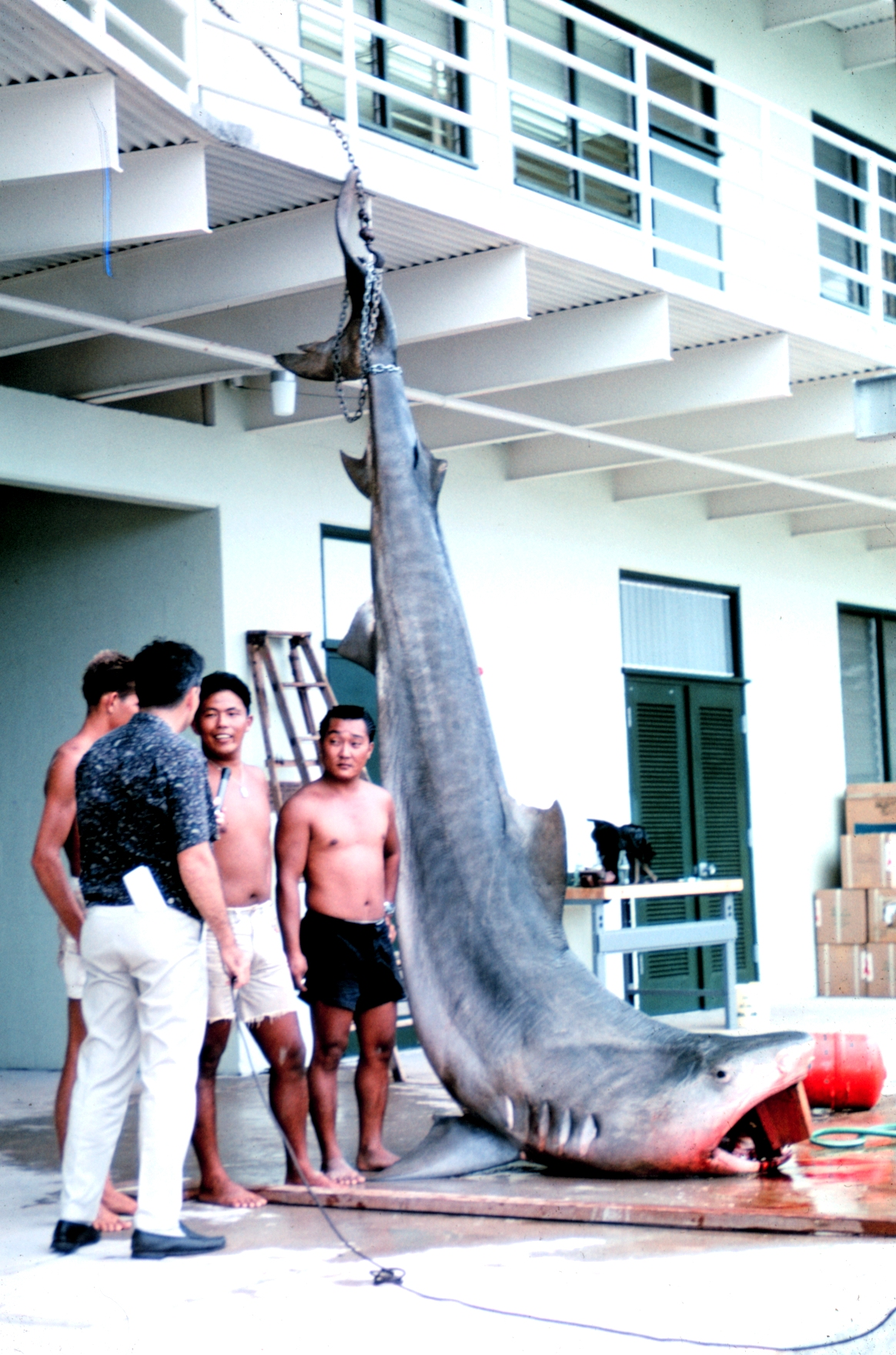
A 14-foot (4.3 m), 1,200-pound (540 kg) tiger shark caught in Kāne'ohe Bay, Oahu, in 1966

Shark culling is the deliberate killing of sharks by government authorities, usually in response to one or more shark attacks. The term "shark control" is often used by governments when referring to culls. Shark culling has been criticized by environmentalists, conservationists and animal welfare advocates—they say killing sharks harms the marine ecosystem and is unethical. Government officials often cite public safety (attempting to reduce the risk of shark attacks) as a reason for culling. The impact of culling is also minor compared to bycatch with 50 million sharks caught each year by the commercial fishing industry.

Shark culling mainly occurs in four locations: New South Wales, Queensland, KwaZulu-Natal and Réunion.

== Methods ==
=== Shark nets ===
Shark nets such as those used in New South Wales are designed to entangle and kill sharks and other animals that pass near them.

Christopher Neff, a Ph.D. scholar at the University of Sydney notes, "Internationally, shark nets have been labeled a 'key threatening process' for killing endangered species." He adds:" ... killing endangered species to boost public confidence or to show government action is not workable. It is a disservice to the public."

=== Drum lines ===
A drum line is an unmanned aquatic trap used to lure and capture large sharks using baited hooks—some (such as those in Queensland) are designed to kill sharks.

Drum lines have been criticized for being environmentally destructive and speciesist, and have sparked public demonstrations and vocal opposition, particularly from environmentalists, animal welfare advocates and ocean activists. Conservationists say killing sharks on drum lines harms the marine ecosystem. In addition, Western Australia Fisheries Minister Dave Kelly said "there is currently no scientific evidence to show that drumlines reduce the risk of a [shark] attack". Shark experts and conservationists also say there is no evidence that drum lines prevent shark attacks.

== Current shark culling locations ==
=== New South Wales (Australia) ===
The government of New South Wales has a program that deliberately kills sharks using shark nets. They were first installed in 1935. The current net program in New South Wales has been described as being "extremely destructive" to marine life, including sharks. Between September 2017 and April 2018, more than 403 animals were killed in the nets in New South Wales, including 10 critically endangered grey nurse sharks, seven dolphins, seven green sea turtles and 14 great white sharks. Between 1950 and 2008, 352 tiger sharks and 577 great white sharks were killed in the nets in New South Wales. Also during this period, a total of 15,135 marine animals were killed in the nets, including whales, turtles, rays, dolphins, and dugongs. More than 5,000 marine turtles have been caught on the nets. Sixty-five percent of shark attacks in New South Wales occurred at netted beaches.

The current net program in New South Wales has been called "outdated and ineffective", and has been criticized by environmentalists, who say nets harm the marine ecosystem. They say there is no science showing that nets make the ocean safer for people. Humane Society International calls the nets a "knee-jerk reaction". The New South Wales government prohibits people from rescuing entangled animals—this prohibition has been called "heartless and cruel".

Following 11 shark attacks along the New South Wales north coast between 2014 and 2016, including two fatalities, shark nets and "smart" drum lines were deployed in December 2016 to cover five additional beaches along the New South Wales North Coast in a six-month trial. Five nets were deployed off Seven Mile Beach off Lennox Head; Sharpes, Shelly and Lighthouse beaches off Ballina; and Main Beach at Evans Head. No shark attacks occurred at the netted beaches during the trial, and the trial was continued for the 2017-18 summer.

In August 2018, it was announced that the nets in northern New South Wales would be removed, but that the nets in Sydney, Newcastle and Wollongong would stay. The New South Wales Green party said they wanted all lethal nets to be removed.

=== Queensland (Australia) ===
From 1962 to the present, the government of Queensland has targeted and killed sharks in large numbers by using drum lines and shark nets, under a "shark control" program—this program has also killed large numbers of other animals such as Dolphins; it has also killed endangered hammerhead sharks. Queensland currently operates the largest shark culling program in Australia. In the first 11 months of 2013, 633 sharks were captured in Queensland—more than 95% of those sharks were killed. From 2013 to 2014, 667 sharks were killed on Queensland's drum lines and in shark nets, including great white sharks and critically endangered grey nurse sharks. From 2014 to 2015, 621 sharks were killed in Queensland. From 2017 to 2018, 218 sharks were killed, including 75 tiger sharks and 41 bull sharks; at least 64 sharks were shot and killed during this period. From 2001 to 2018, a total of 10,480 sharks were killed on lethal drum lines in Queensland. From 1962 to 2018, roughly 50,000 sharks were killed by Queensland authorities.

Afd.org.au stated the following in 2015:

"[Data] reveals the ecological carnage of [Queensland's] shark control regime. In total, more than 8,000 marine species with some level of protection status have been caught by the Queensland Shark Control Program, including 719 loggerhead turtles, 442 manta rays and 33 critically endangered hawksbill turtles. More than 84,000 marine animals have been ensnared by drum-lines and shark nets since the program began in 1962 [...] Nearly 27,000 marine mammals have been snared. The state's shark control policy has captured over 5,000 turtles, 1,014 dolphins, nearly 700 dugongs and 120 whales, all of which are federally protected marine species."

About 360 baited drum lines have been placed off the coast of Queensland, including 78 along the Sunshine Coast, 54 near Townsville, 27 near Mackay and 38 near Cairns.

Since the policy was implemented there has only been one recorded death, at Amity Point in January 2006. 21-year-old Sarah Kate Whiley was attacked by as many as three sharks in Rainbow Channel. The attack occurred in an unpatrolled area. Queensland Fisheries Minister John McVeigh has described the longevity of the netting and drum line program as being "a good indicator that it had the support of most Queenslanders". However, a 2014 poll indicated that 80% of Australians did not approve of shark culling in Australia.

The shark-killing program in Queensland has been criticized by environmentalists, conservationists, and animal welfare advocates—they say Queensland's shark-killing program is unethical and harms the marine ecosystem. Queensland's shark-killing program has been called "outdated, cruel and ineffective". The Australian Marine Conservation Society said, "the ecological cost of drum lines is high, with 97% of sharks caught since 2001 considered to be at some level of conservation risk."

In September 2018, the government of Queensland began culling sharks with drum lines in Cid Harbour in the Whitsunday Islands in response to two non-fatal shark attacks—six sharks (including five tiger sharks) were shot and killed, and their bodies were dumped at sea. The killings have been called a cull. Environmental groups criticized the cull; Shark Conservation Australia called the killings a "disgusting knee-jerk reaction" and said it was "a very shameful day here in Australia". The cull was also called a "farce". Jonathan Clark of the Sea Shepherd group said culling sharks would not make swimmers safer. National Geographic cameraman Andy Casagrande said the following about the cull: "When will basic intelligence and respect for the planet be a requirement for highly paid supposedly educated government officials?" Most Whitsunday locals resisted the cull.

The government of Queensland currently kills sharks in the Great Barrier Reef using 173 lethal drum lines; in 2018, Humane Society International filed a lawsuit (court challenge) requesting that the drum lines be removed there.

In October 2018, the Queensland state government proposed a policy which would ban the photography of shark culling in Queensland; Lawrence Chlebeck of Humane Society International said the following about this proposal: "The Queensland Government's plan to put exclusion zones around shark control equipment is simply a measure to keep the slaughter of sharks and marine wildlife hidden from public view. This is not about public safety, rather it's a blatant tactic to reduce public scrutiny by a government under increased public pressure to end its archaic culling program."

=== KwaZulu-Natal (South Africa) ===
Shark nets and drum lines are utilised to kill sharks in a "shark control" program in KwaZulu-Natal, South Africa which has been occurring in KwaZulu-Natal since the 1950s. The region's shark attack statistics primarily reflect the effectiveness of netting, as drum lines were only introduced recently, following their successful use for over 40 years in Queensland, Australia. The KwaZulu-Natal Sharks Board (KZNSB) says, "Both types of equipment function by reducing shark numbers in the vicinity of protected beaches, thereby lowering the probability of encounters between sharks and people at those beaches." The KZNSB also states that there were seven fatal attacks at Durban from 1943 until the installation of shark nets in 1952, and that no fatalities or incidents resulting in serious injury have occurred since nets were installed. According to the KZNSB, "from 1940 until most of those beaches were first netted in the 1960s, there were 16 fatal attacks and 11 resulting in serious injury. In the three decades since nets were installed, there have been no fatal attacks at those beaches and only four resulting in serious injury."

In a 30-year period, more than 33,000 sharks have been killed in KwaZulu-Natal's shark-killing program. During the same 30-year period, 2,211 turtles, 8,448 rays, and 2,310 dolphins were killed. Although shark species such as the great white shark are protected in South Africa, the KwaZulu-Natal Sharks Board is allowed to kill these sharks (an exception was made for them). Shark nets are currently installed in Marine Protected Areas, and kill animals there. The current shark cull in KwaZulu-Natal has been criticized by environmentalists, and has been called "archaic" and "disastrous to the ecosystem". Shark Angels states, "It is hard to believe with all we know about sharks, including their dwindling numbers, their critical role in our oceans, and the small risk they actually pose to us, that the archaic process of killing these animals for bather “protection” still exists. But in KwaZulu-Natal, hundreds of harmless sharks - as well as turtles, dolphins and rays - still meet an untimely death every year as a result of the 28 kilometers of shark nets installed by KwaZulu-Natal Sharks Board (KZNSB)."

=== Réunion (France) ===
The prevalence of shark attacks at Réunion Island—there were 19 attacks between 2011 and 2016, including seven which were fatal—prompted Réunion island's government to carry out a range of systematic long term activities utilising "smart" drumlines and longlines. In 2013, 24 sharks were killed in Réunion. In the five years to August 2016, more than 170 sharks were killed as part of the cull. George H. Burgess called the killings "an archaic, knee-jerk reaction that seems more borne of vengeance than of science." Réunion authorities currently kill about 100 sharks per year.

== Previous shark culling locations ==
=== Dunedin (New Zealand) ===
Shark nets were installed in Dunedin, New Zealand for roughly 40 years, and were removed in 2011. The nets were found to be detrimental to the environment—700 non-target species were killed.

=== Hawaii ===
From 1959 to 1976, a government-funded program killed 4,668 sharks in Hawaii. The program did not change the rate of shark attacks in the waters of Hawaii. Some Native Hawaiians are against shark culling because of the significance of sharks in Hawaiian culture (sharks are viewed as aumakua, or personal-family gods).

=== Western Australia ===
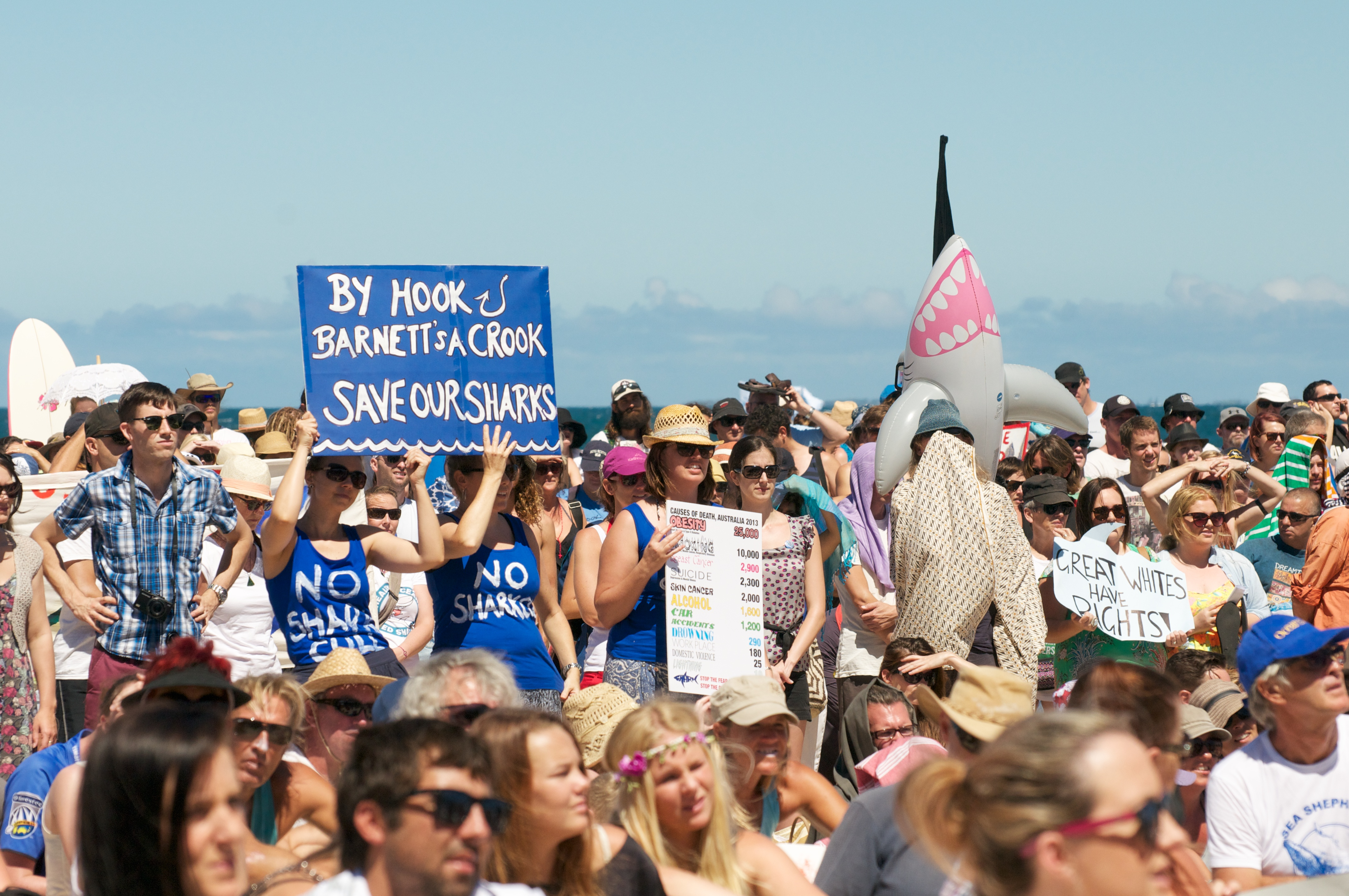
Anti-cull protesters on Perth's Cottesloe Beach in Western Australia in 2014

In 2014, a shark cull in Western Australia killed dozens of sharks (mostly tiger sharks) using drum lines, until it was canceled after public protests and a decision by the Western Australia EPA; from 2014 to 2017, there was an "imminent threat" policy in Western Australia in which sharks that "threatened" humans in the ocean were shot and killed. This "imminent threat" policy was criticized by Senator Rachel Siewert for killing endangered sharks. The "imminent threat" policy was canceled in March 2017. In August 2018, the Western Australia government announced a plan to re-introduce drum lines (though, this time the drum lines are "SMART" drumlines). In November 2018, more than 7,000 Western Australians signed a petition demanding that the planned "SMART" drum line trial be abandoned. In January 2019 the Environmental Protection Authority of Western Australia determined that the "SMART" drumline trial would have minimal impact on the environment.

== Support ==
Long term shark control programs using shark nets and/or drum lines have been very successful at reducing the incidence of shark attacks at the beaches where they are installed. The Queensland Government states that the purpose of the program is to "reduce the possibility of shark attacks on humans in coastal waters of the state adjacent to popular coastal beaches used for bathing" and "is committed to maintaining this important safety initiative". Organisations that support shark control programmes include the Queensland State Government, NSW State Government, Surfing Australia, Surfing NSW, Surf Life Saving Queensland, several politicians within the Liberal National Party of Queensland, the French Overseas Department of Réunion, and the KwaZulu-Natal Sharks Board.

In Queensland, in 54 years of operation, only one fatal shark attack has been recorded at a controlled beach, compared to a total of 27 fatal attacks between 1919 and 1961. "From 1900 to 1937, 13 people were killed off New South Wales surf beaches by sharks; over the next 72 years, the death rate fell to eight, only one of which was at a meshed beach." "Similarly, between 1943 and 1951 the South African city of Durban experienced seven fatal attacks but there have been none since nets were introduced in 1952." A more recent analysis highlighted that there were three shark attacks, none fatal, at KwaZulu-Natal's "controlled" beaches between 1990 and 2011, while at unprotected beaches nearby there were 20 fatal attacks in the same period.

In Recife, Brazil, the number of shark attacks was reduced by 97% when long lines and drum lines were deployed—in the Recife program, some of the sharks were caught on drum lines and then moved away from the shoreline. (Note: Between October 2007 and December 2011, about 23% of animals caught on the drum lines died. During that period, about 114 sharks and other animals died.)

In 2017 the Queensland Government stated that "Current evidence indicates traditional capture methods (ie Shark nets and Drum lines) remain the most effective measures to reduce the risk of shark attack".

== Opposition ==
Environmentalists, conservationists, scientists, animal rights activists and shark experts oppose shark culling. They say sharks are important to the marine ecosystem and that killing them harms the marine ecosystem. They also say that shark culling is "outdated, cruel and ineffective". Organizations that oppose shark culling include the Sea Shepherd Conservation Society, Humane Society International, the Australian Marine Conservation Society, Shark Conservation Australia, Sea Life Trust, the Australian Greens Party, and the current government of Western Australia.

The Sea Shepherd group said, "Politicians responsible for the shark cull policy have displayed an unwillingness to explore other shark mitigation strategies". Jessica Morris of Humane Society International calls shark culling a "knee-jerk reaction" and says, "sharks are top order predators that play an important role in the functioning of marine ecosystems. We need them for healthy oceans." Shark author and diver Hugh Edwards said, "We're the intruders in the ocean and the sharks have got a perfect right to be there."

In 2015, Jane Williamson, an associate professor in marine ecology at Macquarie University, said, "There is no scientific support for the concept that culling sharks in a particular area will lead to a decrease in shark attacks and increase ocean safety."

In 2017, "Humane Society International applied for lethal shark control programs in New South Wales and Queensland to be listed as “key threatening processes” under the federal Environment Protection and Biodiversity Conservation Act [of Australia]. That list can include any act that further endangers already threatened species, or adversely affects two or more listed threatened species."

George H. Burgess, the former director of the International Shark Attack File, "describes [shark] culling as a form of revenge, satisfying a public demand for blood and little else"; he said shark culling is a "retro-type move reminiscent of what people would have done in the 1940s and 50s, back when we didn't have an ecological conscience and before we knew the consequences of our actions." Burgess also said shark culling will not make surfers safer. Michael Levenson of the Boston Globe said the following about shark culls: "Traditionally, shark hunts, or culls, have been the first and perhaps most primal response to shark attacks worldwide. But scientists argue that while such hunts may quench the public's desire for vengeance after a [shark] attack, they do little to reduce the likelihood of another one."

Animal rights activists note the suffering and cruelty inflicted upon animals caught in nets and drum lines: this suffering includes lacerations, stress, disease, and death. Recent research has shown that humane dispatch of sharks is possible, however, through accurate brain destruction.

There are also reports of shark attack survivors being harassed and abused on social media, presumably by extreme environmentalists.

== Alternatives to shark culling ==
In a program in Recife, Brazil, sharks were captured and moved 8 kilometers away from local beaches (though, the program did result in the deaths of about 23% of animals caught on the drum lines, including 114 sharks between 2007 and 2011). The Sea Shepherd group says, "private investors are trialing various programs such as electronic deterrents, drones, the Eco Shark Barrier at a local beach in Perth, and smart phone applications which use social media to advise the community of where sharks are spotted". A non-lethal Shark Spotters program in Cape Town, South Africa has been in use since 2006.

== Culling compared to bycatch from commercial fishing ==
The impact of shark culling is minor compared to bycatch from commercial fishing. On average, 15 great white sharks are caught by the NSW and Queensland shark control programme each year, compared to 186 caught in Australia from other activities. Australia's commercial shark fishing industry catches over 1200 tonnes of shark each year, 130 of which being great white sharks. The NSW prawn trawling industry alone results in 64 tonnes of shark as bycatch each year, with two thirds dying. Tuna and swordfish longline fishing off the coast of South Africa reported 39,000 to 43,000 sharks killed each year between 1995 and 2005. Sharksavers estimates that in total 50 million sharks are caught unintentionally each year as bycatch by the commercial fishing industry.

== See also ==
- Shark attack
  - Shark attack prevention
- Speciesism

=== Books ===
- Chasing Shadows: My Life Tracking the Great White Shark by Greg Skomal
- Close to Shore by Michael Capuzzo about the Jersey Shore shark attacks of 1916
- The Devil's Teeth by Susan Casey
- Twelve Days of Terror by Richard Fernicola about the same events
