= Chasing Shadows: My Life Tracking the Great White Shark =

2023 memoir by Greg Skomal

Chasing Shadows
- 2023 first edition book cover
- Author: Greg Skomal, Ret Talbot
- Publisher: HarperCollins
- Publication date: July 11, 2023
- ISBN: 9780063090835

Chasing Shadows: My Life Tracking the Great White Shark is a memoir written by Greg Skomal that chronicles his decades long career as an Atlantic shark researcher. It was published in July 2023 by William Morrow, an imprint of HarperCollins. Ret Talbot, a science writer and independent journalist, co-authored this book. Talbot collaborated with Skomal so that the book would appeal to a general audience. The goal for Skomal is to educate and share insights with readers about the Great white shark.

== Other books ==
- Close to Shore by Michael Capuzzo about the Jersey Shore shark attacks of 1916
- Twelve Days of Terror by Richard Fernicola about the same events
- The Devil's Teeth by Canadian born journalist Susan Casey.
