= Oprah Daily =

Monthly magazine founded by Oprah Winfrey

- July 2012 cover of O
- Editor: Lucy Kaylin
- Categories: Women's magazine
- Frequency: Monthly
- Total circulation: 2,395,496 (2014)
- First issue: April 19, 2000
- Final issue: Print: December 2020 Digital: December 2026
- Company: Hearst Communications
- Country: USA
- Based in: New York City
- Language: English
- Website: oprahdaily.com
- ISSN: 1531-3247

Oprah Daily, formerly O, The Oprah Magazine, was an American monthly magazine founded by talk show host Oprah Winfrey and Hearst Communications.

== Overview ==
It was first published on April 19, 2000. As of June 2004, its average paid circulation was more than 2.7 million copies, two thirds by subscription. A South African edition was first published in April 2002; according to the South African Advertising Research Foundation, its average readership was more than 300,000. The editor of the South African edition is Samantha Page. While the sales of most magazines published in the U.S. declined in 2009, O Magazine increased its newsstand sales by 5.8 percent to 662,304 copies during the second half of the year. O's newsstand sales fell 15.8% during the first half of 2010, while its subscription circulation increased, and sales fell 8.2% in the later half of the year.

Since its inception until the September 2020 edition, Oprah appeared on the cover of every issue of O. The first cover with someone else on it is that of April 2009 issue in which Oprah appears together with the First Lady Michelle Obama. The second shared cover is with fellow daytime host Ellen DeGeneres on the December 2009 issue, in which four separate covers were shot for this special holiday issue. For the first time in 20 years of publication, the September 2020 edition featured entirely someone other than Oprah on the cover. This edition featured the late Breonna Taylor, a young woman killed by police in Louisville, Kentucky.

The magazine serves 63.6% white, 29.8% African-American, 8.8% Hispanic, 1.8% Asian and 6.6% other women. It is directed towards a median age of 47.9, median home value of $214,281, median HHI of $68,911, and median IEI of $38,756.

The last print issue was the December 2020 issue, after an announcement in July 2020 stating there would be no more print issues after the December 2020 issue. The issue featured an article where Oprah thanked readers and also acknowledged it was the "final monthly print edition" of O.

In 2021, Winfrey and Hearst relaunched O, The Oprah Magazine as Oprah Daily. It came with a new website called OprahDaily.com, a membership community Oprah Insider, and a quarterly print magazine titled O Quarterly. Hearst Magazines announced the website and quarterly magazine would cease on December 31, 2026. Most subscribers would receive a free year subscription to Good Housekeeping. Axios reported Winfrey planned to personally give $20,000 to more than two dozen affected employees.

== Digital editions ==
The December 2010 issue was the first released digitally through the magazine's iPad app. The app features exclusive videos of Oprah, allows readers to preview and purchase books presented in the magazine's Reading Room and O List sections, and gives users the ability to purchase monthly or yearly subscriptions. Individual issues are also available for download through the app.

== Staff ==
In July 2009, Susan Casey became the editor-in-chief of the magazine. Before joining, she was the development editor of Time Inc. Casey was editor-in-chief of Sports Illustrated Women, editor-at-large for Time Inc., and creative director of Outside. Casey wrote The New York Times bestseller The Devil's Teeth: A True Story of Obsession and Survival Among America's Great White Sharks (2005), and The Wave.

In September 2009, the magazine hired former Publishers Weekly editor-in-chief Sara Nelson as books editor at O.

In May 2013, Lucy Kaylin was promoted to editor-in-chief, replacing Susan Casey.

On October 20, 2022, Pilar Guzman was name editorial director of Oprah Daily.

== Books ==
Inspired by Oprah's Book Club, O has always paid regular attention to books since inception. In 2015, the magazine teamed up with Flatiron Books of St. Martin's Press and itself published a series of inspirational books, including O's Little Book of Happiness and, in 2016, O's Little Book of Love & Friendship.

Oprah's Book Club 2.0 has continued to promote books for people to read. The latest book by Megha Majumdar, A Guardian and A Thief was selected for October 2025. Since 2012 the Book Club has selected 45 books.

== Public perception ==
In a March 2001 article entitled "O Positive", Noreen O'Leary argued that Winfrey was well on her way to influencing the content of women's magazines beyond her own, just as she has helped reshape daytime TV and the world of book publishing.

== Brockmeyer lawsuit ==
In April 2001, Oprah Winfrey and the Hearst Corporation were sued for trademark infringement by Ronald Brockmeyer, publisher of «O», a German erotic periodical whose publication dated back to the 1990s. In a March 2003 decision, Judge John Koeltl dismissed the suit, citing the different content of the two magazines in addition to the irregular publication schedule and minimal American sales of the German magazine.
