= The Devil's Teeth =

2005 book by Susan Casey

The Devil's Teeth: A True Story of Obsession and Survival Among America's Great White Sharks
- First edition cover
- Author: Susan Casey
- Language: English
- Subject: Great white sharks
- Genre: Non-fiction
- Publisher: Henry Holt and Company
- Publication date: June 7, 2005
- Publication place: United States
- Media type: Print, e-book
- Pages: 304 pp.
- ISBN: 978-0805075816

The Devil's Teeth: A True Story of Obsession and Survival Among America's Great White Sharks is a non-fiction book about great white sharks by Canadian born journalist Susan Casey. The text was initially published by Henry Holt and Company on June 7, 2005.

== Overview ==
Susan Casey became infatuated with great white sharks of the Farallon Islands—dubbed by sailors in the 1850s the "devil's teeth." The sharks there are at the top of the food chain, some longer than twenty feet, and they congregate 27 miles off the coast of San Francisco. After going through many restrictions and barriers, she manages to join a group of scientists studying predation patterns by great white sharks within the so-called Red Triangle.

== Commentary ==
As the creative director of Outside magazine during its Jon Krakauer-Sebastian Junger heyday, Casey ([then] the development editor of Time Inc.) acquired a good ear for the false notes of ecotourism and a thorough understanding of the humbling swipe nature can take at cocky adventurers. Because of that awareness, she often allows herself to come across as a blundering nautical novice, which is refreshing (and true), though somewhat alarming considering that her lack of competence puts the researchers themselves and the funding for their project in jeopardy. In fact, though no one becomes shark bait, the story ends in misfortune for two of its cast, leaving one to wonder if the book itself is a bittersweet apologia to those who may have suffered because of Casey's admittedly single-minded obsession with the Farallon whites.

— Louise Flynn

== Bestselling list ==
- New York Times bestseller
- San Francisco Chronicle bestseller
- 2005 NPR Summer Reading selection
- Men’s Journal Top-10 Read
- Barnes & Noble Discover selection

== Other books ==
- Close to Shore by Michael Capuzzo about the Jersey Shore shark attacks of 1916
- Twelve Days of Terror by Richard Fernicola about the same events
- Chasing Shadows: My Life Tracking the Great White Shark by Greg Skomal

== Sources ==
- Casey, Susan (7 June 2005). The Devil's Teeth: A True Story of Obsession and Survival Among America's Great White Sharks. Henry Holt and Company. ISBN 978-0-8050-7581-6.
