= Chasing Shadows =

Chasing Shadows may refer to:

== Arts and entertainment ==
- Chasing Shadows (TV series), a British television series
- Chasing Shadows, a 2010 documentary film by Shalom Almond
- "Chasing Shadows", a chapter of the game GemCraft

== Literature ==
- Chasing Shadows, the name of several photography collections by Santu Mofokeng
- Chasing Shadows: Memoirs of a Sixties Survivor, a 1996 book by Fred A. Wilcox
- Chasing Shadows, a 2000 autobiography of Hugo Gryn (also made into a film)
- Chasing Shadows, a 2000 story collection by Lucrecia Guerrero
- Chasing Shadows: A Special Agent's Lifelong Hunt to Bring a Cold War Assassin to Justice, a 2011 book by Fred Burton with John R. Bruning
- Chasing Shadows, a 2013 novel by Swati Avasthi
- Sekret Machines: Book 1 – Chasing Shadows, a 2016 American novel by Tom DeLonge and A. J. Hartley
- Chasing Shadows: My Life Tracking the Great White Shark, a 2023 book by Greg Skomal

== Music ==
=== Albums ===
- Chasing Shadows (The Comsat Angels album), 1986
- Chasing Shadows, a 1957 album by Jackie Davis
- Chasing Shadows, a 1997 album by Davy Steele
- Chasing Shadows, a 2000 album by John Etheridge
- Chasing Shadows, a 2007 album by the German band Empire featuring the frontman Doogie White
- Chasing Shadows, a 2012 album by The Strange Familiar
- Chasing Shadows (EP), a 2016 EP by Angels & Airwaves
- Chasing Shadows (Black Tide album)
- Chasing Shadows (Smokie album), 1992

=== Songs ===
- "Chasing Shadows", a song by Alex Warren from the 2025 album You'll Be Alright, Kid
- "Chasing Shadows", a song by Anoushka Shankar from the 2011 album Traces of You
- "Chasing Shadows", a song by Chaos Divine from the 2011 album The Human Connection
- "Chasing Shadows", a song by Coldrain from the 2025 EP Optimize
- "Chasing Shadows", a song by Deep Purple from the 1969 album Deep Purple
- "Chasing Shadows", a song by Frankmusic from the 2013 album Between
- "Chasing Shadows", a 2013 song by Jamie Drastik featuring Pitbull and Havana Brown
- "Chasing Shadows", a 1935 song by Jimmy Dorsey and Tommy Dorsey; covered by many artists
- "Chasing Shadows", a song by Imminence from the 2021 album Heaven in Hiding
- "Chasing Shadows", a song by Kansas from the 1982 album Vinyl Confessions
- "Chasing Shadows", a song by Paul Field from the 1983 album Daybreak
- "Chasing Shadows", a song by Paul Rodgers from the 1997 album Now
- "Chasing Shadows", a song by Santigold from the 2016 album 99¢
- "Chasing Shadows", a song by Shakira from the 2014 album Shakira
- "Chasing Shadows", a song by Yanni from the 1997 album In the Mirror
