= Sporting Woman Quarterly =

- Sporting Woman Summer 2006
- First issue: 2005
- Country: United States
- Based in: Palm Beach, Florida
- Language: English
- Website: www.sportingwoman.com

Sporting Woman Quarterly is a national women's sports lifestyle magazine catering to the "women's luxury sports industry." The magazine was established in 2005. Its headquarters is in Palm Beach, Florida. It features seasonal highlights of luxury sporting events including polo and equestrian events, golf, tennis, and international sports. Arranged in sixteen sections, it covers upscale sporting events, sporting trends, sportswear lines and accessories, sporting goods, travel information, promotional events, venues, dates and ticket information. Seasonal sections for sports and fitness resorts, travel, dining and accommodations are also showcased among its behind-the-scenes interviews.

Sporting Woman Quarterly has interviewed and featured some of the greatest athletes, such as Lindsay Davenport, Luke Jensen, Paula Creamer, and Maria Sharapova and has a new column in its winter issue hosted by Christie Brinkley which features outdoor sports make-up tips and as well as an interview from the U.S. Open with Andre Agassi.

Sporting Woman Quarterly had its origination in 2002 as an online source for luxury sports fans seeking VIP sporting event information on polo. As a quarterly print publication with four regular and two supplemental special issues it has replaced Sports Illustrated for Women's now defunct women's sports magazine in the marketplace.

== See also ==
- Sports Illustrated for Women
- WomenSports
