= 12 Days of Terror =

2004 television film directed by Jack Sholder

- DVD release poster
- Based on: Twelve Days of Terror by Richard Fernicola
- Screenplay by: Jeffrey Reiner; Tommy Lee Wallace
- Directed by: Jack Sholder
- Starring: Colin Egglesfield; Mark Dexter; Jenna Harrison; John Rhys-Davies
- Theme music composer: J. Peter Robinson
- Country of origin: South Africa
- Original language: English

Production
- Producer: Dennis Stuart Murphy
- Cinematography: Jacques Haitkin
- Editor: Michael Schweitzer
- Running time: 86 minutes

Original release
- Network: Animal Planet
- Release: 1 May 2004

12 Days of Terror is a 2004 television film directed by Jack Sholder and starring Colin Egglesfield, Mark Dexter, Jenna Harrison and John Rhys-Davies. Based on a true story, it revolves around the 1916 Jersey shark attacks, as recounted in the book of the same name by Richard Fernicola, in which a juvenile great white shark begins a series of attacks that takes place of the course of 12 days in New Jersey. On 1 May 2004, it premiered on Animal Planet and later on the Discovery Channel.

== Plot ==
On 1 July 1916, in New Jersey during WWI, local lifeguard Alex Trednot watches over one of the beaches. He is approached by his best friend Stanley and ex-girlfriend Alice for his opinion on a wedding cake. Suddenly, beachgoer Charles Van Sant is attacked by a mysterious force. Alex and four other lifeguards rush to save him, but Charles is badly injured and dies from it. Alex believes it was a shark, but because he didn't see it clearly, his story is dismissed. The beaches remain open, but a local boat captain named Cap believes Alex, having hunted sharks for much of his life. Alex tries to convince Mayor Perillo to close the beaches, but he says he cannot unless experts confirm it is a shark.

Later that evening, President Wilson visits the Jersey Shore and gives a speech about change and safety from war. Alex's boss Commissioner Meel assures Alex the attack won’t happen again. Alice comes to Alex and asks him if he has any regrets about her and Stan getting married. He asks her the same question. On 7 July, after Charles Van Sant died, more people come to the beaches. When fellow lifeguard Danny Bruder goes to retrieve two swimmers venturing too far from shore, he is attacked. Alex and others rescue him, but Danny dies. Now knowing it's a shark, Alex quits in frustration.

In New York City, wild animal wrangler Michael Schleisser reads about the shark attacks and travels to New Jersey. At a press conference, Museum Director Dr. Frederick Lucas and Ichthyologist Dr. John Nichols investigate the attacks and try to prevent another. Meanwhile, Stan meets up with Alex and tries to convince him to get his lifeguarding job back. Alex is hesitant, as he doesn't want to work for someone willing to put business over safety. Cap offers Alex a job helping to put up steel nets to prevent future attacks. While on the job, one person on Cap's boat thinks they see the shark and accidentally shoots one of the divers.

With the steel net in place, the beaches reopen. When a group of boys ask Stan to play baseball with them, he and Alex have a talk and forgive each other. Dr. Nichols meets with Alex and asks him about the shark. Cap stands atop a bridge and notices the shark swimming into Matawan Creek. He makes a call about it, but is deemed crazy. Cap reaches a small town upriver and warns everyone to stay out of the water. Unfortunately, young boy Lester swimming with his friends is attacked. Stan and his friends rush to the river to save Lester, but can't find him. Cap finds Alex and warns him about the shark. They spend hours searching for Lester and even put out a net, but they still can't find him. The shark lurks nearby, and one of the searchers is injured. Stan's friends gave up, but Stan refused to stop searching. Just when it seemed all hope was lost, Stan finds Lester. But their relief is short-lived as the shark attacks again, knocking Lester out of Stan's arms. Alex hits the shark with a paddle, and it lets go of Stan. Cap chases after the shark while Alex takes Stan to a doctor.

A mother having a picnic with her daughters sees the shark coming downstream towards a group of boys swimming. She tries to warn them, but one of the boys, Joseph Dunn, is attacked. Cap arrives in time and rams the shark, forcing it to release the boy. The shark swims downstream back to the ocean. While on a train on his way to a hospital, Stan dies from his injuries. The townspeople, fed up with the shark, try to hunt it down and kill it. On 12 July, Cap seemingly "captures" the shark. But Alex meets with Dr. Nichols, who tells him he's looking for a juvenile great white shark, although he considers it might be a bull shark, since it swam upriver. Nichols tells Alex that he should find the shark where it has been successful, but not alone.

Alex meets Michael Schleisser and the two talk about the shark. Alex confirms that he is not willing to kill the shark for money nor revenge, only that he doesn't want anyone else killed. Alex approaches Cap and confirms with him the shark he killed is the wrong shark. Feeling sympathy for the Cap since people called him crazy, Alex says that they can find the real shark. Alex and Cap go together to kill the shark. While searching for and even encountering the shark itself (a 7.5 ft (2.3 m) juvenile great white), Cap and Alex meet with Schleisser, who has a net under his small boat to capture the shark. The shark reappears and gets itself caught in the net. It tows Schleisser in its net, hoping it will tire itself out and die. At one point it stops and tips Schleisser over. Alex and Cap manage to save Schleisser and Alex traps the shark even more before it can escape. After several hours, the shark dies from exhaustion.

The group takes the shark back to land and hang it up for everybody to see. Dr. Nichols confirms it to be a juvenile great white. Alex asks Dr. Nichols about becoming an ichthyologist and says to meet him in his office. After that, Alex and Alice get back together. After the shark was finally captured offshore, an autopsy was performed, and it is said that 15 pounds of human flesh with bones were found in its stomach. In the end, four people were killed, a fifth badly injured, and Lester's remains were recovered. Because a propensity for human flesh is unnatural in sharks, scientists are still investigating why this shark did what it did.

== Cast ==
- Colin Egglesfield as Alex
- Mark Dexter as Stanley Fisher (victim)
- Jenna Harrison as Alice
- John Rhys-Davies as Captain
- Jamie Bartlett as Michael Schleisser
- Adrian Galley as Engel
- Colin Stinton as Dr. John Treadwell Nichols
- Roger Dwyer as Dr. Frederic Lucas
- Craig Geldenhuys as Arnie
- Andrew Mark Smith as Joseph Dunn
- George Christopher Smith as Michael Dunn

== See also ==
- List of killer shark films
