= Diana Reiss =

American scientist

- Born: 1948 or 1949 (age 76–77); Philadelphia, Pennsylvania, U.S.
- Education: Temple University (PhD)
- Occupation: professor of psychology at Hunter College

Diana Reiss (born 1948 or 1949 in Philadelphia, Pennsylvania) is a professor of psychology at Hunter College and in the graduate program of Animal Behavior and Comparative Psychology at the City University of New York. Reiss's research has focused on understanding cognition and communication in dolphins and other cetaceans. Her important contributions include demonstrating mirror self-awareness in dolphins via the Mirror test.

Her work in conservation and animal welfare includes "the protection of dolphins in the tuna-fishing industry and her current efforts to bring an end to the killing of dolphins in the drive hunts in Japan."

She was the scientific advisor for The Cove and wrote The Dolphin in the Mirror: Exploring Dolphin Minds and Saving Dolphin Lives.

Reiss earned a doctorate from Temple University. She was a professor and friend of actress Isabella Rossellini

== Bibliography ==
The following are a selection of Diana Reiss' peer-reviewed publications.

- Reiss D, B McCowan, and Lori Marino. 1997. Communicative and other cognitive characteristics of bottlenose dolphins. Trends in Cognitive Sciences. 1(4):140-145.
- Reiss D and L Marino. 2001. Mirror self-recognition in the bottlenose dolphin: A case of cognitive convergence. PNAS. 98(10):5937-5942.
- Plotnik JM, FBM de Waal, and D Reiss. 2006. Self-recognition in an Asian elephant. PNAS. 103(45):17053-17057.
- Marino L, RC Connor, RE Fordyce, LM Herman, PR Hof, L Lefebvre, D Lusseau, B McCowan, EA Nimchinsky, AA Pack, R Rendell, JS Reidenberg, D Reiss, MD Uhen, E Van der Gucht, and H Whitehead. 2007. Cetaceans have complex brains for complex cognition. PLoS Biology. 5(5):966-972.
- Plotnik JM, FBM de Waal, D Moore 3rd, and D Reiss. 2010. Self-recognition in the Asian elephant and future directions for cognitive research with elephants in zoological settings. ZooBiol. 29(2):179-191.
- Foerder P, M Galloway, T Barthel, DE Moore 3, and D Reiss. 2011. Insightful problem solving in an Asian elephant. PLoS ONE. 6(8):e23251.
