= Lori Marino =

American marine life scientist

Lori Marino is the founder and executive director of The Kimmela Center for Animal Advocacy and founder and President of the Whale Sanctuary Project. She was formerly a senior lecturer at Emory University for 20 years and faculty affiliate at the Emory Center for Ethics. She is also a Creative Affiliate at the Safina Center.

== Life ==
Along with Diana Reiss, she co-authored the first study showing mirror self-recognition in bottlenose dolphins in 2001. She has been involved with work in dolphin and whale neuroanatomy for thirty years, showing that the brains of dolphins became as complex as those of great apes through a different neuroanatomical route. Susan Casey described her work in her book Voices in the Ocean, about dolphins. She interviewed Marino who told her about how dolphins have more complex brains than humans.

She has also been interviewed in the documentary Blackfish and the 2021 Netflix Documentary 'Seaspiracy'.
