= Susan Casey =

Canadian born writer and magazine editor

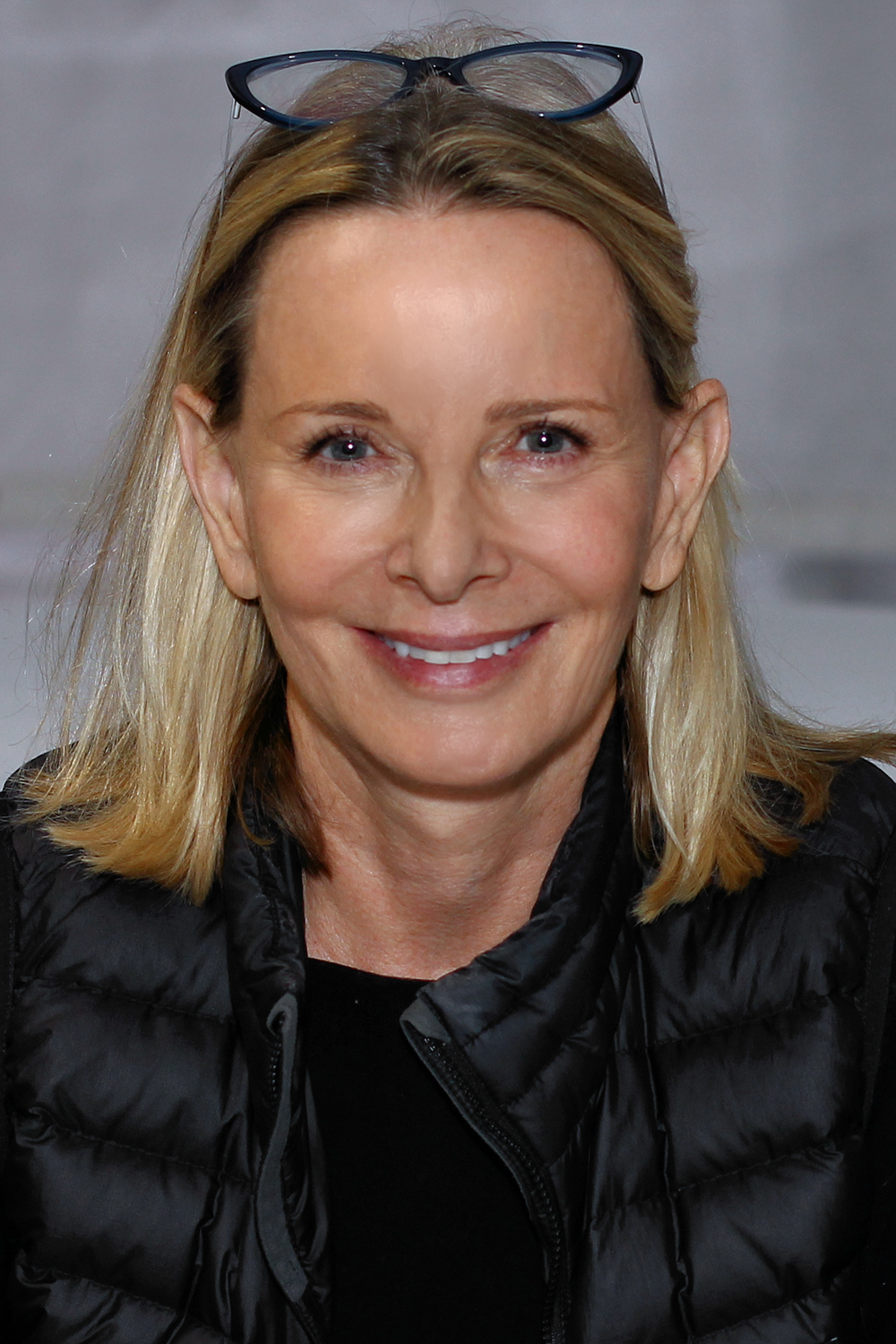
- Born: 1962; Toronto
- Occupations: Writer, journalist, editor, editor-in-chief
- Employer: Oprah Daily
- Website: susancasey.com

Susan Casey (born 1962) is a Canadian writer. She has been lead editor of Sports Illustrated Women and O, The Oprah Magazine and she has written several non-fiction books including The Devil's Teeth concerning sharks in the Greater Farallones National Marine Sanctuary in California.

== Life ==
Casey was born in Toronto. She became creative director of Outside magazine and she joined what was then "Sports Illustrated for Women" in early 2001 as managing editor. Despite her re-vamp and being nominated for a National Magazine award, the (now named) Sports Illustrated Women was discontinued at the end of 2002 by Time Inc.

Casey has written several non-fiction books. In 2005, when she was development editor of Time Inc., she published the best-selling book, The Devil's Teeth: A True Story of Obsession and Survival Among America's Great White Sharks, concerning great white sharks that she had observed from the Farallon Islands, 27 miles off San Francisco. She observed the dozens of sharks that are part of a research project by ornithologist Peter Pyle and Scot Anderson. Anderson has studied the sharks in the Greater Farallones National Marine Sanctuary for 25 years.

In 2010, she was editor-in-chief of O, The Oprah Magazine when she published The Wave: In the Pursuit of the Rogues, Freaks and Giants of the Ocean. The book discusses incidences and evidence for huge waves that can be 90 feet high or more. She also includes the sport of tow-in surfing using examples of surfers like Laird Hamilton who get their surfboards towed by boats to high speeds so that they can ride larger and faster waves. She was interviewed on The Daily Show with Jon Stewart about herself and the book. During her tenure at O, The Oprah Magazine, Casey traveled to meet with John of God, a prolific medical grifter and serial rapist. Her credulous profile of him, subsequently published in O, The Oprah Magazine, significantly elevated his profile and helped funnel gullible victims to him.

In 2013, Casey stood down as editor of O, The Oprah Magazine so that she could write another book. She was replaced by Lucy Kaylin who was promoted from the magazine's staff. Casey's next book, Voices in the Ocean, published in 2015, was about dolphins. She describes the experience of swimming with dolphins and their exploitation by humans for amusement and consumption. She interviewed Lori Marino who told her about the intelligence of these mammals with more complex brains than humans.

In 2023, Casey published The Underworld: Journeys to the Depths of the Ocean, an investigation of the deep ocean, its history, its champions, and the urgent need for protection from destruction. Captivated by mysteries held by the 98% of our biosphere which is in the dark, Casey spent years researching the book, including two deep dives in Hawaii and the Caribbean.
