= Sports Illustrated for Women =

American sports magazine

- Spring 1999 cover with Seimone Augustus
- Frequency: Bimonthly
- Founded: 1999
- Final issue: November 2002
- Company: Time, Inc.
- Language: English

Sports Illustrated Women (previously called Sports Illustrated for Women) and also known as SI Women, was a bimonthly sports magazine covering (according to its statement of purpose) "the sports that women play and what they want to follow", from basketball to tennis, soccer to volleyball, field hockey to ice hockey and figure skating and more. It featured real athletes, told their real stories and gave the real scoop on women's sports. Sports Illustrated for Women was published by Time Inc." It ran for 20 issues, between March 2000 and November 2002, targeting an audience of women, 18–34 years old, with "a passion for sports".

== History ==
Sports Illustrated for Women, renamed Sports Illustrated Women (SI Women) in 2001, launched under the leadership of Cleary Simpson, Group Publisher and Sandy Bailey, Editor in Chief. SI Women initially ran test publications as Sports Illustrated Women/Sport, in 1997. The test magazine was published in two issues, followed by four special issues in 1999, under the title Sports Illustrated Women. In January 2000, Paula Romano joined as Publisher and helped redefine the magazine. The March 2000 launch of the ongoing product, slated for six issues per year, included a website, siforwomen.com. Circulation base rate was estimated at 300,000. By 2002 it had reached 400,000. Its newsstand price was $3.50. Publishers Information Bureau statistics showed that SI Women's ad pages jumped 26.51 percent from 2000 to 2001 and its revenues increased 73.28 percent, from $5,499,509 to $9,529,281.

The magazine went through a makeover and name change (to SI Women) in September 2001, after Susan Casey, former Editor of Outside, took over from Sandy Bailey, as Editor in Chief. Research showed that, "women are more interested in sports as participants than fans, unlike men." That year, the magazine expanded, planning 10 issues per year and revamping its content to, "a wider range of activities pursued by today's modern, active women," including participatory sports with sections on training and adventure travel. In 2002, SI Women received a nomination for General Excellence from the National Magazine Awards.

== Last issue ==
On 14 October 2002, SI Women announced that December 2002 would be its last issue. President Ann S. Moore cited the downturn in the ad economy, stating, "SI Women needed a significant investment to reach its potential", and, "The investment climate was simply not on our side."
