= Close to Shore =

2001 book by Michael Capuzzo

Close to Shore: A True Story of Terror in an Age of Innocence
- First edition cover
- Author: Michael Capuzzo
- Language: English
- Subject: Jersey Shore shark attacks of 1916; History of New Jersey
- Publisher: Broadway Books
- Publication date: 2001
- Publication place: United States
- Media type: Hardback; Paperback
- Pages: 317
- ISBN: 0-7679-0413-3 (hardback)
- OCLC: 46565150
- Dewey Decimal: 597.3/1566 21
- LC Class: QL638.93 .C36 2001

Close to Shore: A True Story of Terror in an Age of Innocence is a non-fiction book by journalist Michael Capuzzo about the Jersey Shore shark attacks of 1916. The book was published in 2001 by Broadway Books.

According to a reviewer writing for the New Yorker, it is an "adventure classic". The factual content and backgrounds were based on Richard Fernicola's In Search of the Jersey Man-Eater (1987).

An adapted version, Close to Shore: The Terrifying Shark Attacks of 1916, was published in 2003, aimed at a middle-school audience, with fewer biographical background of the victims. There are photos and news clippings not in the original. Capuzzo's description of the shark's behaviour verges on being anthropomorphic.
