= Jersey Shore shark attacks of 1916 =

Shark attacks in the United States

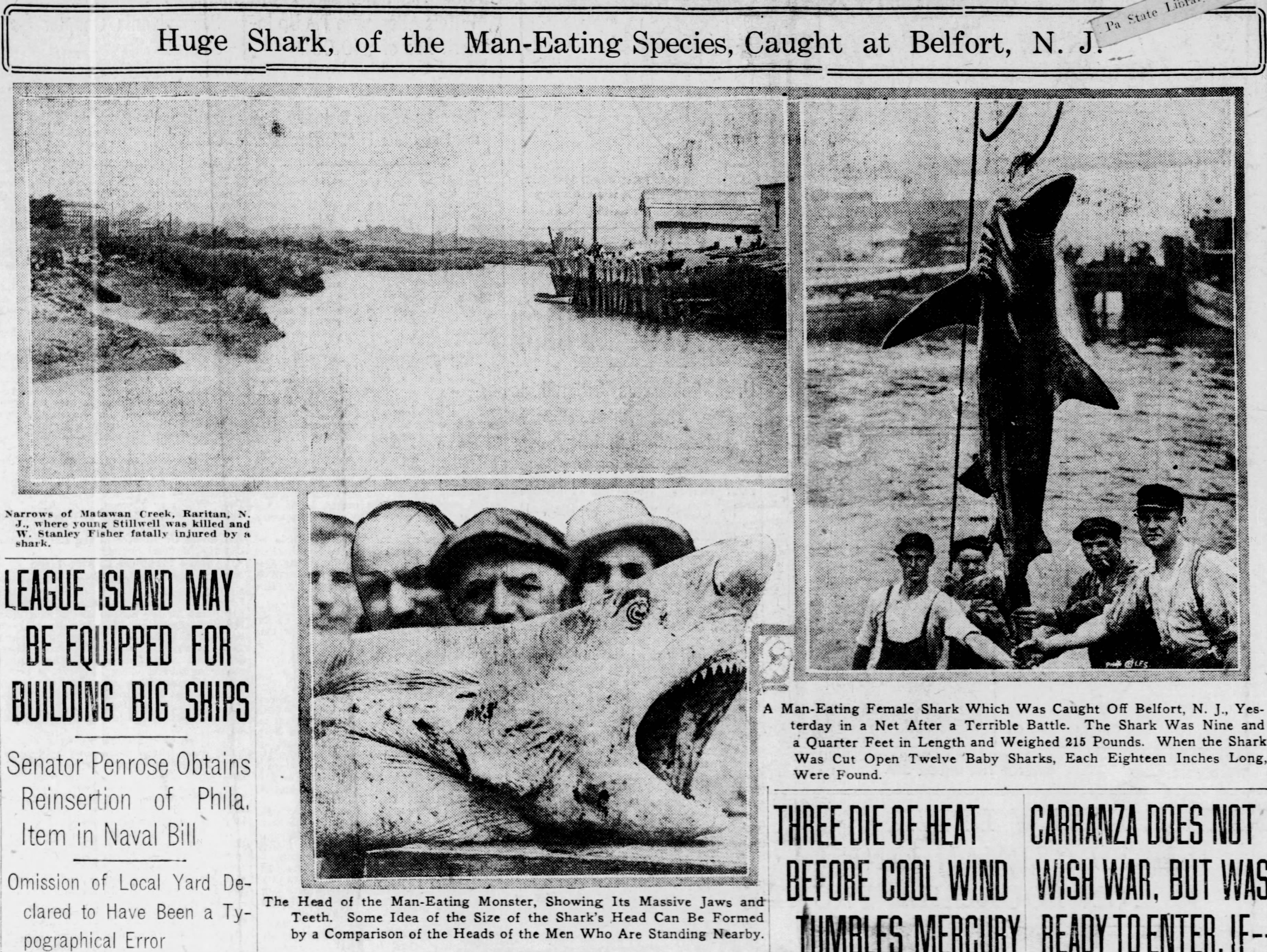
- The Philadelphia Inquirer reported the capture of a "man-eating" shark off the Jersey Shore after the attacks.
- Location: The coast of New Jersey
- Date: Between July 1 and 12, 1916
- Attack type: Shark attacks
- Deaths: 4 (1 critically injured)

The Jersey Shore shark attacks of 1916 were a series of shark attacks along the coast of New Jersey, in the United States, between July 1 and 12, 1916, in which four people were killed and one critically injured. The incidents occurred during a deadly summer heat wave and polio epidemic in the United States that drove thousands of people to the seaside resorts of the Jersey Shore. Since 1916, scholars have debated which shark species was responsible and the number of animals involved, with the great white shark and the bull shark most frequently cited.

Personal and national reaction to the fatalities involved a wave of panic that led to shark hunts aimed at eradicating the population of "man-eating" sharks and protecting the economies of New Jersey's seaside communities. Resort towns enclosed their public beaches with steel nets to protect swimmers. Scientific knowledge about sharks before 1916 was based on conjecture and speculation. The attacks forced ichthyologists to reassess common beliefs about the abilities of sharks and the nature of shark attacks.

The Jersey Shore attacks immediately entered into American popular culture, where sharks became caricatures in editorial cartoons representing danger. The attacks became the subject of documentaries for the History Channel, National Geographic Channel, and Discovery Channel, which aired 12 Days of Terror (2004) and the Shark Week episode Blood in the Water (2009).

== Incidents and victims ==
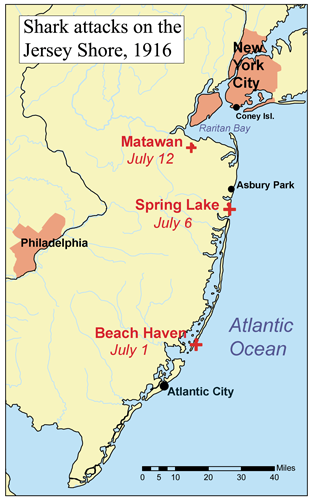
Map of the Jersey Shore attacks

Between July 1 and 12, 1916, five people were attacked along the coast of New Jersey by sharks; only one of the victims survived—a child. The first major attack occurred on Saturday, July 1 at Beach Haven, a resort town established on Long Beach Island off the southern coast of New Jersey. Charles Epting Vansant, 23, of Philadelphia, was on vacation at the Engleside Hotel with his family. Before dinner, Vansant decided to take a quick swim in the Atlantic with a Chesapeake Bay Retriever that was playing on the beach. Shortly after entering the water, Vansant began shouting. Bathers believed he was calling to the dog, but a shark was actually biting Vansant's legs. He was rescued by lifeguard Alexander Ott and bystander Sheridan Taylor, who claimed the shark followed him to shore as they pulled the bleeding Vansant from the water. Vansant's left thigh was stripped of its flesh; he bled to death on the manager's desk of the Engleside Hotel at 6:45 PM.

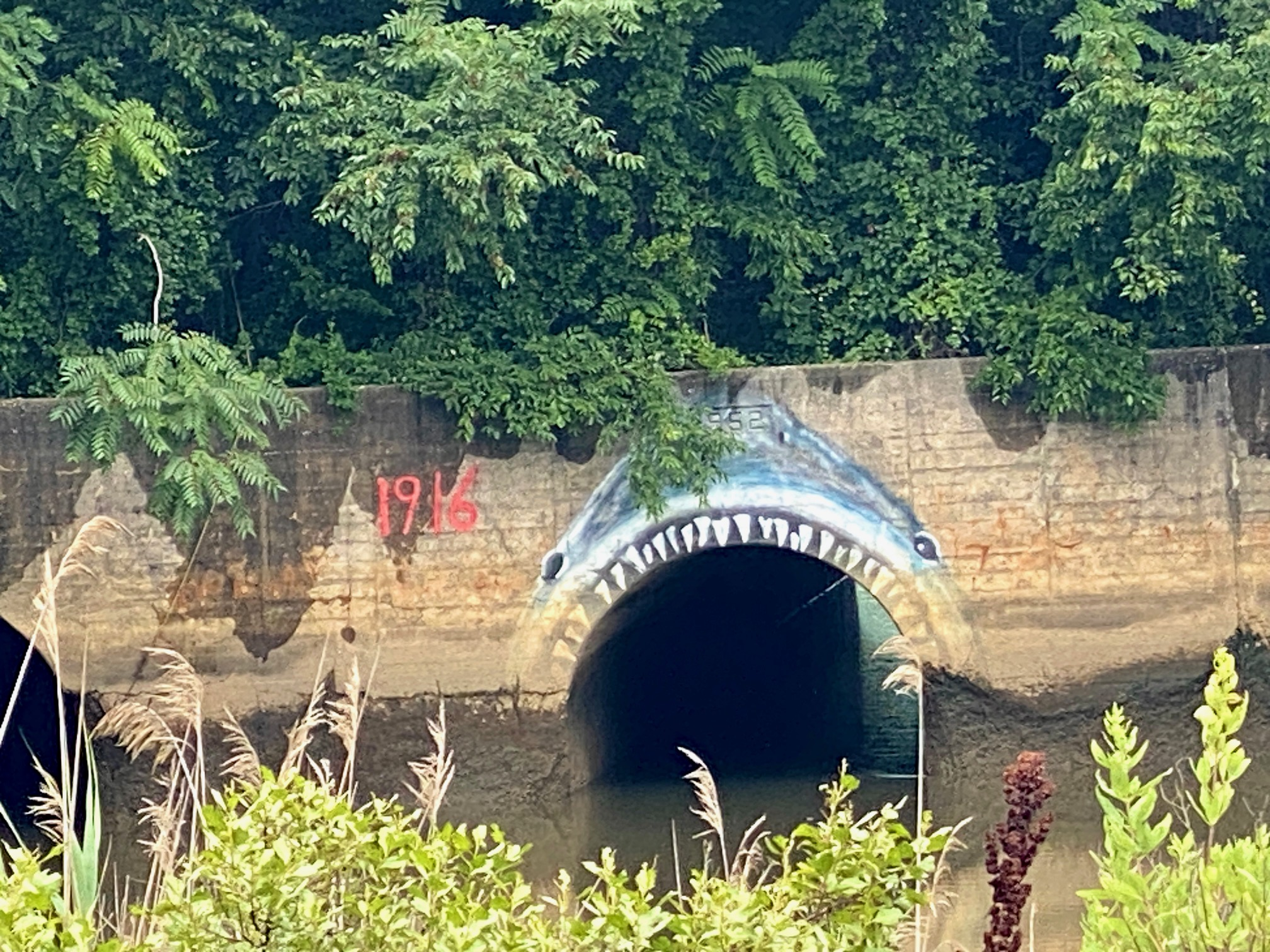
Mural on bridge in area of Matawan Creek attacks, Matawan, New Jersey

Despite the Vansant attack, beaches along the Jersey Shore remained open. Sightings of large sharks swimming off the coast of New Jersey were reported by sea captains entering the ports of Newark and New York City but were dismissed. The second major attack occurred on Thursday, July 6, 1916, at the resort town of Spring Lake, New Jersey, 45 miles (72 km) north of Beach Haven. The victim was Charles Bruder, 27, a Swiss bell captain at the Essex & Sussex Hotel. Bruder was attacked while swimming 130 yards (120 m) from shore. A shark bit his abdomen and severed his legs; Bruder's blood turned the water red. After hearing screams, a woman notified two lifeguards that a canoe with a red hull had capsized and was floating at the water's surface. Lifeguards Chris Anderson and George White rowed to Bruder in a lifeboat and realized he had been bitten by a shark. They pulled him from the water, but he bled to death on the way to shore. According to The New York Times, "women [were] panic-stricken [and fainted] as [Bruder's] mutilated body ... [was] brought ashore." Guests and workers at the Essex & Sussex and neighboring hotels raised money for Bruder's mother in Switzerland.

The next three attacks took place in Matawan Creek near the town of Keyport on Wednesday, July 12. Located 30 miles (48 km) north of Spring Lake and inland of Raritan Bay, Matawan resembled a Midwestern town rather than an Atlantic beach resort. Matawan's location made it an unlikely site for interactions between sharks and humans. When Thomas Cottrell, a sea captain and Matawan resident, spotted an 8-foot-long (2.4 m) shark in the creek, the town dismissed him. Around 2:00 PM a group of local boys, including young Lester Stillwell, 11, were playing in the creek together. One of the boys had brought along his pet dog, which was swimming with them as well. At an area called "Wyckoff Dock" they saw what appeared to be an "old, black weather-beaten board or a weathered log." A dorsal fin appeared in the water and the boys realized it was a shark. Before Stillwell could climb from the creek, the shark pulled him underwater.

The boys ran to town for help, and several men, including local businessman Watson Stanley Fisher, 24, came to investigate. Fisher and others dove into the creek to find Stillwell, thinking he had suffered a seizure. After locating the boy's body and attempting to return to shore, Fisher was also bitten by the shark in front of the townspeople, losing Stillwell in the process. His right thigh was severely injured and he bled to death at Monmouth Memorial Hospital in Long Branch at 5:30 PM. Stillwell's body was recovered 150 feet (46 m) upstream from the Wyckoff dock on July 14.

The fifth and final victim, Joseph Dunn, 14, of New York City was attacked a half-mile (~805 m) from the Wyckoff dock nearly 30 minutes after the fatal attacks on Stillwell and Fisher. The shark bit his left leg, stripping it of flesh, but Dunn was rescued by his brother and friend after a vicious tug-of-war battle with the shark. Dunn told the press that he felt his leg going down the shark's throat, "I believe it would have swallowed me." Dunn was taken to Saint Peter's University Hospital in New Brunswick; he recovered from the bite and was released on September 15, 1916.

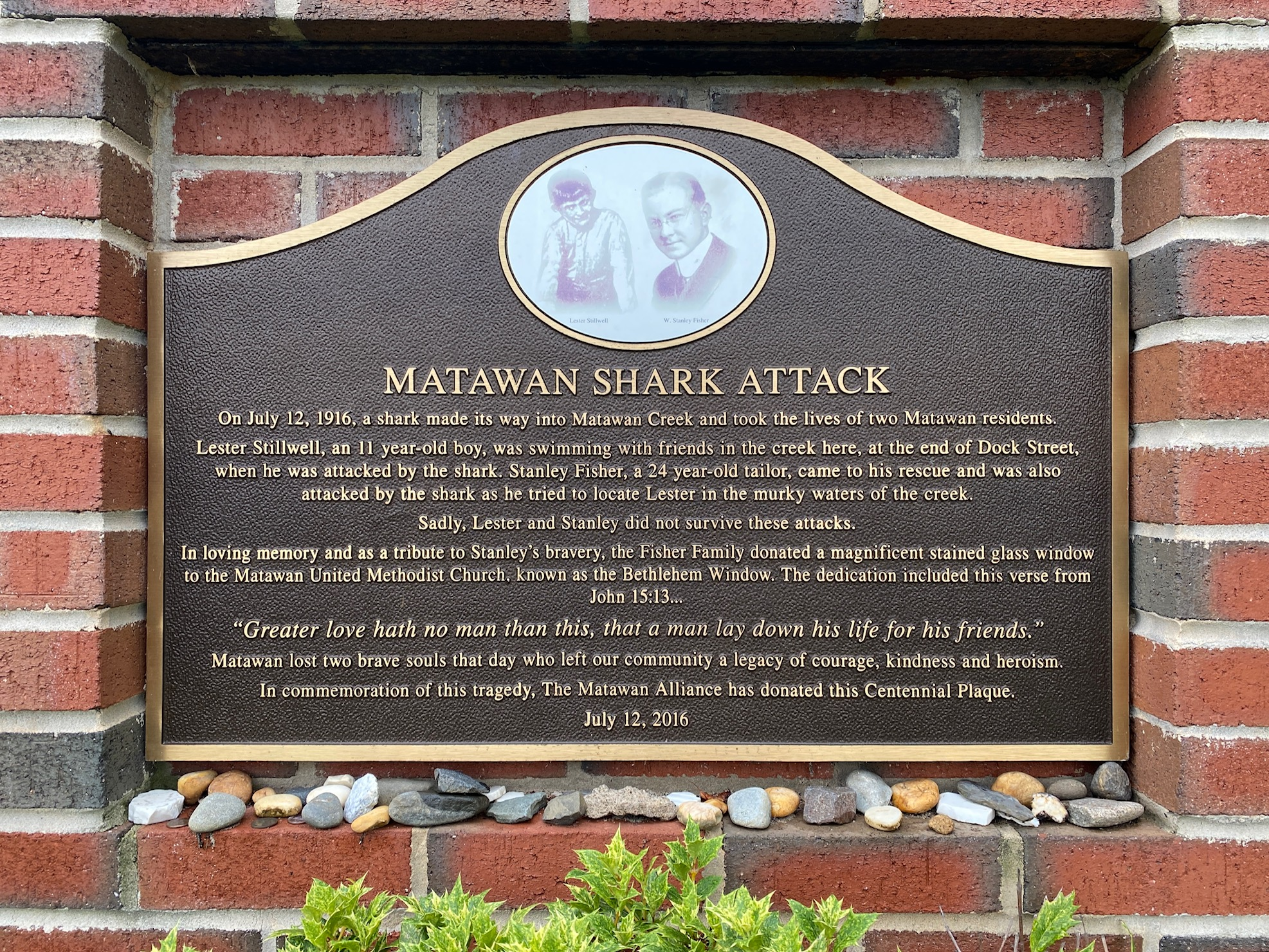
Memorial plaque dedicated to the victims of the 1916 Matawan Creek shark attacks, Matawan, New Jersey

== Reaction ==
As the national media descended on Beach Haven, Spring Lake, and Matawan, the Jersey Shore attacks started a shark panic. According to Capuzzo, this panic was "unrivaled in American history", "sweeping along the coasts of New York and New Jersey and spreading by telephone and wireless, letter and postcard."

At first, after the Beach Haven incident, scientists and the press only reluctantly blamed the death of Charles Vansant on a shark. The New York Times reported that Vansant "was badly bitten in the surf ... by a fish, presumably a shark." Still, State Fish Commissioner of Pennsylvania and former director of the Philadelphia Aquarium James M. Meehan asserted in the Philadelphia Public Ledger that the shark was preying on the dog and had bitten Vansant by mistake. He specifically de-emphasized the threat sharks posed to humans:

Despite the death of Charles Vansant and the report [of] two sharks having been caught in that vicinity recently, I do not believe there is any reason why people should hesitate to go in swimming at the beaches for fear of man-eaters. The information in regard to the sharks is indefinite and I hardly believe that Vansant was bitten by a man-eater. Vansant was in the surf playing with a dog and it may be that a small shark had drifted in at high water, and was marooned by the tide. Being unable to move quickly and without food, he had come in to bite the dog and snapped at the man in passing.

The media's response to the second attack was more sensational. Major American newspapers such as the Boston Herald, Chicago Sun-Times, The Philadelphia Inquirer, The Washington Post, and San Francisco Chronicle placed the story on the front page. The New York Times' headline read, "Shark Kills Bather Off Jersey Beach". The growing panic cost New Jersey resort owners an estimated $250,000 ($7,400,000 in 2025) in lost tourism, and sun bathing declined by 75 percent in some areas.

A press conference was convened on July 8, 1916, at the American Museum of Natural History, with scientists Frederic Augustus Lucas, John Treadwell Nichols, and Robert Cushman Murphy as panelists. To calm the growing panic, the three men stressed that a third run-in with a shark was unlikely, although they were admittedly surprised that sharks bit anyone at all. Nevertheless, Nichols—the only ichthyologist in the trio—warned swimmers to stay close to shore and to take advantage of the netted bathing areas installed at public beaches after the first attack.

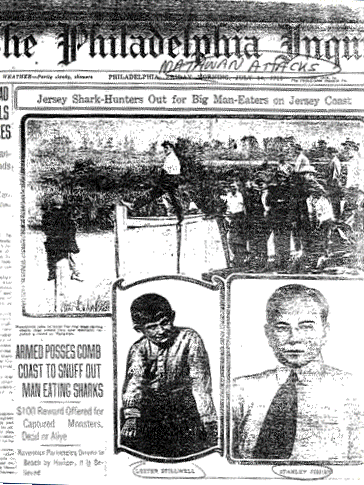
Philadelphia Inquirer coverage of the attacks at Matawan, with portraits of Stanley Fisher (bottom right) and Lester Stilwell

Shark sightings increased along the Mid-Atlantic Coast following the attacks. On July 8, armed motorboats patrolling the beach at Spring Creek chased an animal they thought to be a shark, and Asbury Park's Asbury Avenue Beach was closed after lifeguard Benjamin Everingham claimed to have beaten away a 12-foot-long (4 m) shark with an oar. Sharks were spotted near Bayonne, New Jersey; Rocky Point, New York; Bridgeport, Connecticut; Jacksonville, Florida; and Mobile, Alabama, and a columnist from Field & Stream captured a sandbar shark in the surf at Beach Haven. Actress Gertrude Hoffmann was swimming at the Coney Island beach shortly after the Matawan fatalities when she claimed to have encountered a shark. The New York Times noted that Hoffman "had the presence of mind to remember that she had read in the Times that a bather can scare away a shark by splashing, and she beat up the water furiously." Hoffman was certain she was going to be devoured by the "Jersey man-eater", but later admitted she was "not sure ... whether she had her trouble for nothing or had barely escaped death."

Local New Jersey governments tried to protect bathers and the economy from man-eating sharks. The Fourth Avenue Beach at Asbury Park was enclosed with a steel-wire-mesh fence and patrolled by armed motorboats; it remained the only beach open following the Everingham incident. After the attacks on Stilwell, Fisher, and Dunn, residents of Matawan lined Matawan Creek with nets and detonated dynamite in an attempt to catch and kill the shark. Matawan mayor Arris B. Henderson ordered the Matawan Journal to print wanted posters offering a $100 reward ($3,000 in 2025 dollars) to anyone who killed a shark in the creek. Despite these efforts, no sharks were captured or killed in Matawan Creek.

Resort communities along the Jersey Shore petitioned the federal government to aid local efforts to protect beaches and hunt sharks. The House of Representatives appropriated $5,000 ($150,000 in 2025 dollars) for eradicating the New Jersey shark threat, and President Woodrow Wilson scheduled a meeting with his Cabinet to discuss the fatal attacks. Treasury secretary William Gibbs McAdoo suggested that the Coast Guard be mobilized to patrol the Jersey Shore and protect sun bathers. Shark hunts ensued across the coasts of New Jersey and New York. As the Atlanta Constitution reported on July 14, "Armed shark hunters in motor boats patrolled the New York and New Jersey coasts today while others lined the beaches in a concerted effort to exterminate the man-eaters ..." New Jersey governor James Fairman Fielder and local municipalities offered bounties to individuals hunting sharks. Hundreds of sharks were captured on the East Coast due to the attacks. The East Coast shark hunt has been described as "the largest scale animal hunt in history."

== Identifying the "Jersey man-eater" ==
After the second incident, scientists and the public began presenting theories to explain which species of shark was responsible for the Jersey Shore attacks or whether multiple sharks were involved.

Lucas and Nichols proposed that a northward-swimming rogue shark was responsible. They believed it would eventually arrive along New York's coast: "Unless the shark came through the Harbor and went through the north through Hell Gate and Long Island Sound, it was presumed it would swim along the South Shore of Long Island and the first deep water inlet it reaches will be the Jamaica Bay."

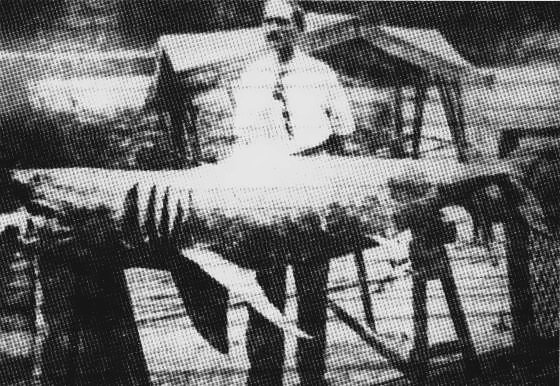
German American Michael Schleisser and the great white shark caught in Raritan Bay purported to be the "Jersey man-eater", as seen in the Bronx Home News

Witnesses of the Beach Haven fatality estimated that the shark was 9 feet (3 m) long. A sea captain who saw the event believed it was a Spanish shark driven from the Caribbean Sea decades earlier by bombings during the Spanish–American War. Several fishermen claimed to have caught the "Jersey man-eater" in the days following the attacks. A blue shark was captured on July 14 near Long Branch, and four days later the same Thomas Cottrell who had seen the shark in Matawan Creek claimed to have captured a sandbar shark with a gillnet near the mouth of the creek.

On July 14, Harlem taxidermist and Barnum and Bailey lion tamer Michael Schleisser caught a 7.5-foot (2.3 m), 325-pound (147 kg) shark while fishing in Raritan Bay, only a few miles from the mouth of Matawan Creek. The shark nearly sank the boat before Schleisser killed it with a broken oar. When he opened the shark's belly, he removed a "suspicious fleshy material and bones" that took up "about two-thirds of a milk crate" and "together weighed fifteen pounds." Scientists identified the shark as a young great white and the ingested remains as human. Schleisser mounted the shark and placed it on display in the window of a Manhattan shop on Broadway, but it was later lost. The only surviving photograph appeared in the Bronx Home News.

No further attacks were reported along the Jersey Shore in 1916 after the capture of Schleisser's great white shark. Murphy and Lucas declared the great white to be the "Jersey man-eater".

Skeptical individuals offered alternative hypotheses, including opinions suggesting a non-shark perpetrator and even the influence of ongoing events associated with World War I.

In a letter to The New York Times, a Barrett P. Smith of Sound Beach, New York, over 135 miles (217 km) away on the far side of Long Island, wrote:

Having read with much interest the account of the fatality off Spring Lake, N.J., I should like to offer a suggestion somewhat at variance with the shark theory. Scientists believe it is most unlikely that a shark was responsible, and lots of people though believe it much more likely that the attack was made by a sea turtle. Scientists have spent much time at sea and along shore, and have several times seen turtles large enough to inflict just such wounds. These creatures are of a vicious disposition, and when annoyed are extremely dangerous to approach, and it is a common theory that Bruder may have disturbed one while it was asleep on or close to the surface.

Another letter to The New York Times blamed the shark infestation on the maneuvers of German U-boats near America's East Coast. The anonymous writer claimed, "These sharks may have devoured human bodies in the waters of the German war zone and followed liners to this coast, or even followed the Deutschland herself, expecting the usual toll of drowning men, women, and children." The writer concluded, "This would account for their boldness and their craving for human flesh."

Over a century later, there is no consensus among researchers over Murphy and Lucas' investigation and findings. Richard G. Fernicola published two studies of the event, and notes that "there are many theories behind the New Jersey attacks," and all are inconclusive. Researchers such as Thomas Helm, Harold W. McCormick, Thomas B. Allen, William Young, Jean Campbell Butler, and Michael Capuzzo generally agree with Murphy and Lucas.

However, the National Geographic Society reported in 2002 that "some experts are suggesting that the great white may not in fact be responsible for many of the attacks pinned on the species. These people say the real culprit behind many of the reported incidents—including the famous 1916 shark attacks in New Jersey that may have served as inspiration for Jaws—may be the lesser known bull shark."

Biologists George A. Llano and Richard Ellis suggest that a bull shark could have been responsible for the fatal Jersey Shore attacks. Bull sharks swim from the ocean into freshwater rivers and streams and have attacked people around the world. In his book Sharks: Attacks on Man (1975), Llano writes,

One of the most surprising aspects of the Matawan Creek attacks was the distance from the open sea. Elsewhere in the book are accounts of well-documented shark-human interactions at Ahwaz, Iran, which is 90 miles (140 km) upriver from the sea. It may also be of interest to note that sharks live in Lake Nicaragua, a fresh-water body, and in 1944 there was a bounty offered for dead freshwater sharks, as they had "killed and severely injured lake bathers recently."

Ellis points out that the great white "is an oceanic species, and Schleisser's shark was caught in the ocean. To find it swimming in a tidal creek is, to say the least, unusual, and may even be impossible. The bull shark, however, is infamous for its freshwater meanderings, as well as for its pugnacious and aggressive nature." He admits that "the bull shark is not a common species in New Jersey waters, but it does occur more frequently than the white."

In an interview with Michael Capuzzo, ichthyologist George H. Burgess surmises, "The species involved has always been doubtful and likely will continue to generate spirited debate." Burgess, however, does not discount the great white, stating:

The bull draws a lot of votes because the location, Matawan Creek, suggests brackish or fresh waters, a habitat that bulls frequent and whites avoid. However, our examination of the site reveals that the size of the "creek," its depth, and salinity regime were closer to a marine embayment and that a smallish white clearly could have wandered into the area. Since an appropriate sized white shark with human remains in its stomach was captured nearby shortly after the attacks (and no further incidents occurred), it seems likely that this was the shark involved in at least the Matawan fatalities. The temporal and geographical sequence of the incidents also suggests that earlier attacks may have involved the same shark.

The casualties of the 1916 attacks are listed in the International Shark Attack File—of which Burgess is director—as victims of a great white.

The increased presence of humans in the water was a factor in the attacks: "As the worldwide human population continues to rise year after year, so does ... interest in aquatic recreation. The number of shark attacks in any given year or region is highly influenced by the number of people entering the water." However, the likelihood that one shark was involved is contested. Scientists such as Victor M. Coppleson and Jean Butler, relying on evidence presented by Lucas and Murphy in 1916, assert that a single shark was responsible. On the other hand, Richard Fernicola notes that 1916 was a "shark year", as fishermen and captains were reporting hundreds of sharks swimming in the Mid-Atlantic region of the United States. Ellis remarks that "to try to make the facts as we know them conform to the 'rogue shark' theory is stretching sensationalism and credibility beyond reasonable limits." He admits, "The evidence is long gone, and we will never really know if it was one shark or several, one species or another, that was responsible."

In 2011, further study was conducted in the Smithsonian Channel's The Real Story: Jaws. The documentary takes a closer look at the series of events from different perspectives. It was demonstrated in the Matawan Creek attacks, for example, that the full moon of the lunar cycle, which would have coincided with the attacks, would have raised the salinity in the water by more than double just a few hours before high tide. This would support the theory that a great white could have been responsible. Other evidence such as Joseph Dunn's injury suggested that the type of bite was more likely made by a bull shark as opposed to a great white, leading some to believe more than one shark was likely involved in the five incidents.

== Revising science ==
Before 1916, American scholars doubted that sharks would fatally wound a living person in the temperate waters of the northeastern United States without provocation. One skeptical scientist wrote, "There is a great difference between being attacked by a shark and being bitten by one." He believed that sharks tangled in fishing nets or feeding on carrion might accidentally bite a nearby human. In 1891, millionaire banker and adventurer Hermann Oelrichs offered a $500 reward in the New York Sun "for an authenticated case of a man having been attacked by a shark in [the] temperate waters" north of Cape Hatteras, North Carolina. He wanted proof that "in temperate waters even one man, woman, or child, while alive, was ever attacked by a shark." The reward went unclaimed and scientists remained convinced that the upper eastern coast of the United States was inhabited by harmless sharks.

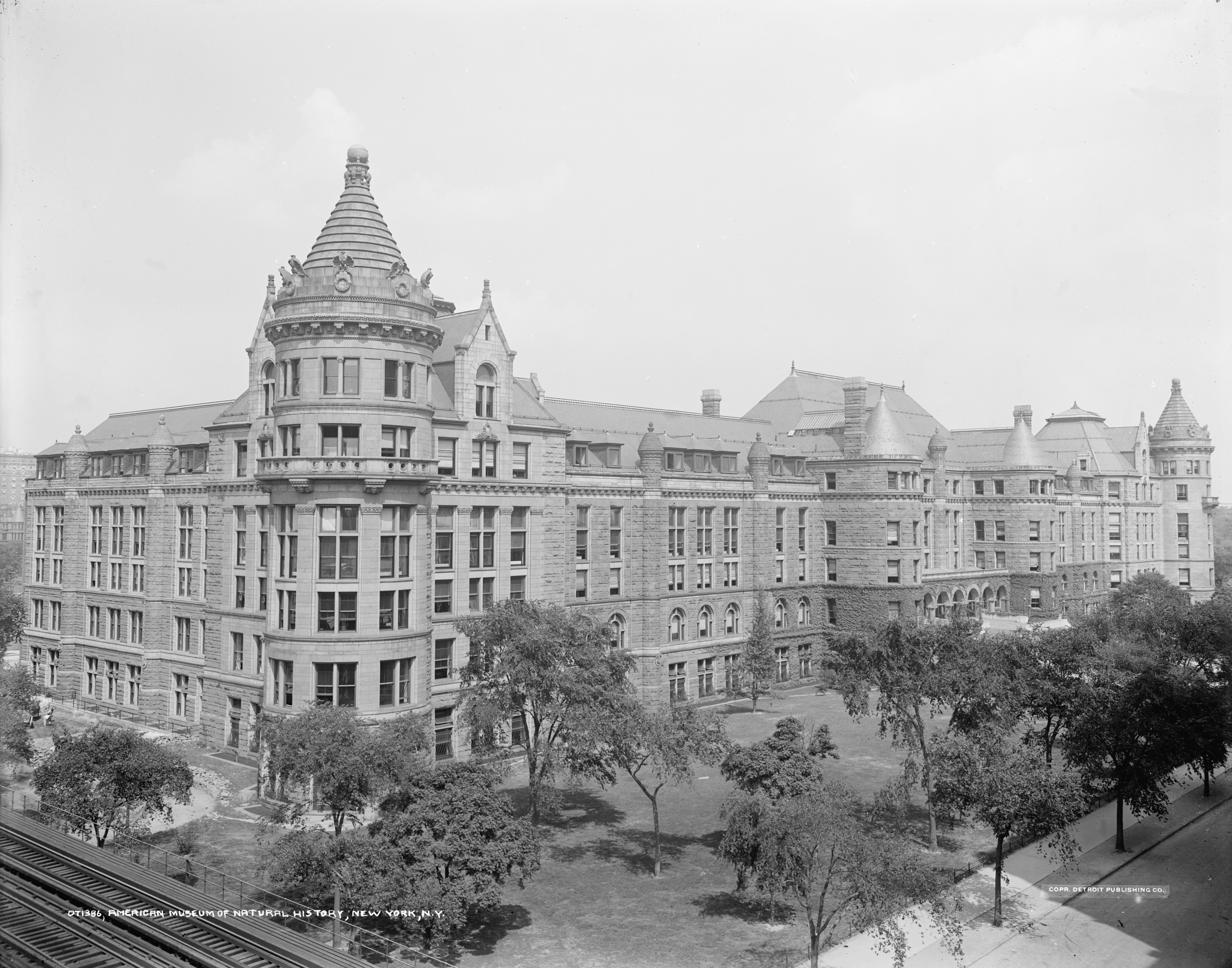
Leading scientists of the American Museum of Natural History in New York City debated the threat posed by sharks before and after the 1916 Jersey Shore attacks

Academics were skeptical that a shark could produce fatal wounds on human victims. Ichthyologist Henry Weed Fowler and curator Henry Skinner of the Academy of Natural Sciences in Philadelphia asserted that a shark's jaws did not have the power to sever a human leg in a single bite. Frederic Lucas, director of the American Museum of Natural History, questioned whether a shark even as large as 30 feet (9 m) could snap a human bone. He told The Philadelphia Inquirer in early 1916 that "it is beyond the power even of the largest Carcharodon to sever the leg of an adult man." Lucas summed up his argument by pointing to Oelrichs's unclaimed reward and that the chances of being bitten by a shark were "infinitely less than that of being struck by lightning and that there is practically no danger of an attack from a shark about our coasts."

The Jersey Shore attacks prompted scientists in the United States to revise their assumptions that sharks were timid and powerless. In July 1916, ichthyologist and editor for the National Geographic Society Hugh McCormick Smith published an article in the Newark Star-Eagle describing some shark species as "harmless as doves and others the incarnation of ferocity." He continued, "One of the most prodigious, and perhaps the most formidable of sharks is the man-eater, Carcharodon carcharias [great white]. It roams through all temperate and tropical seas, and everywhere is an object of dread. Its maximum length is forty feet and its teeth are three inches (76 mm) long."

By the end of July 1916, John Nichols and Robert Murphy were taking the great white more seriously. In Scientific American, Murphy wrote that the "white shark is perhaps the rarest of all noteworthy sharks ... their habits are little known, but they are said to feed to some extent on big sea turtles ... Judging from its physical make-up, it would not hesitate to attack a man in open water." He concluded that "because it is evident that even a relatively small white shark, weighing two or three hundred pounds, might readily snap the largest human bones by a jerk of its body, after it has bitten through the flesh."

Robert Murphy and John Nichols wrote in October 1916:

There is something peculiarly sinister in the shark's make-up. The sight of his dark, lean [dorsal] fin lazily cutting zig-zags in the surface of some quiet, sparkling summer sea, and then slipping out of sight not to appear again, suggests an evil spirit. His leering, chinless face, his great mouth with its rows of knife-like teeth, which he knows too well to use on the fisherman's gear; the relentless fury with which, when his last hour has come, he thrashes on deck and snaps at his enemies; his toughness, his brutal, nerveless vitality and insensibility to physical injury, fail to elicit the admiration one feels for the dashing, brilliant, destructive, gastronomic bluefish, tunny, or salmon.

After the Matawan attacks, Frederic Lucas admitted on the front page of The New York Times that he had underestimated sharks. The paper reported that "the foremost authority on sharks in this country has doubted that any shark ever attacked a human being, and has published his doubts, but the recent cases have changed his view." Nichols later documented the occurrence of the great white shark in his biological survey Fishes of the Vicinity of New York City (1918), "Carcharodon carcharias (Linn.) White Shark. "Man-eater." Accidental in summer. June to July 14, 1916."

== Cultural impact ==
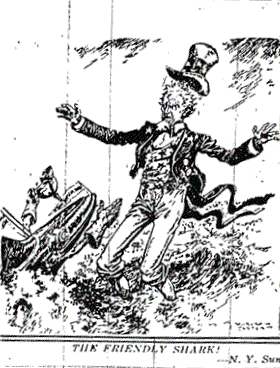
Cartoon from the Philadelphia Evening Bulletin featuring Uncle Sam and a U-boat caricatured as a shark.

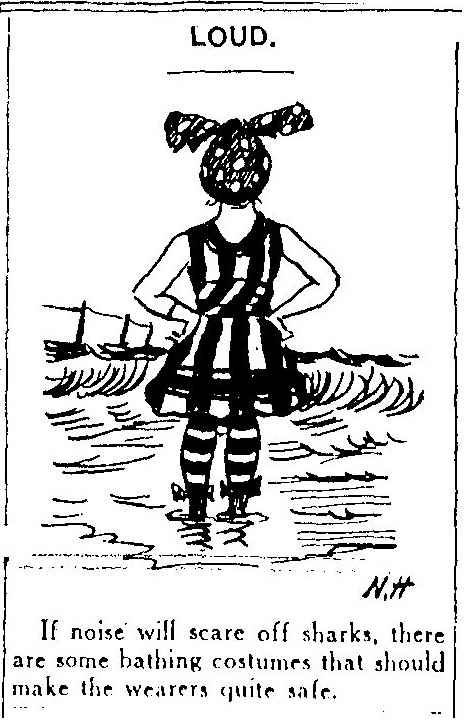
Cartoon commenting on a Victorian era bathing suit and its ability to frighten sharks

After the first fatality, newspaper cartoonists began using sharks as caricatures for political figures, German U-boats, Victorian morality and fashion, polio, and the deadly heat wave threatening the Northeast at the time. Fernicola notes, "Since 1916 was among the years that Americans were trying to break away from the rigidity and conservatism of the Victorian period, one comic depicted a risqué polka-dot bathing suit and advertised it as the secret weapon to keep sharks away from our swimmers." Another cartoon depicted "an exasperated individual at the end of a dock that displays a 'Danger: No Swimming' sign and mentions the three most emphasized 'danger' topics of the day: 'Infantile Paralysis (polio), Epidemic Heat Wave, and Sharks in the Ocean'." The cartoon is entitled "What's a Family Man to Do?" With World War I ongoing in 1916 and America's growing distrust of Germany, cartoonists depicted U-boats with the mouth and fins of a shark assaulting Uncle Sam while he wades in the water.

In 1974, writer Peter Benchley published Jaws, a novel about a rogue great white shark that terrorizes the fictional Long Island coastal community of Amity. Chief of police Martin Brody, biologist Matt Hooper, and fisherman Quint hunt the shark after it kills four people. The novel was adapted as the film Jaws by Steven Spielberg in 1975. Spielberg's film references the events of 1916: Brody (Roy Scheider) and Hooper (Richard Dreyfuss) urge Amity's Mayor Vaughn (Murray Hamilton) to close the beaches on the Fourth of July after the deaths of two swimmers and a fisherman. Hooper explains to the mayor, "Look, the situation is that apparently a great white shark has staked a claim in the waters off Amity Island. And he's going to continue to feed here as long as there is food in the water." Brody adds, "And there's no limit to what he's gonna do! I mean we've already had three incidents, two people killed inside of a week. And it's gonna happen again, it happened before! The Jersey beach! ... 1916! Five people chewed up on the surf!" Richard Ellis, Richard Fernicola, and Michael Capuzzo all suggest that the 1916 Jersey Shore attacks, Coppleson's rogue shark theory, and the exploits of New York fisherman Frank Mundus inspired Benchley.

The 1916 fatal attacks are the subject of three studies: Richard G. Fernicola's In Search of the "Jersey Man-Eater" (1987) and Twelve Days of Terror (2001), and Michael Capuzzo's Close to Shore (2001). Capuzzo offers an in-depth dramatization of the incident, and Fernicola examines the scientific, medical, and social aspects of the attacks. Fernicola's research is the basis of an episode of the History Channel's documentary series In Search of History titled "Shark Attack 1916" (2001) and the Discovery Channel's docudrama 12 Days of Terror (2004). Fernicola also wrote and directed a 90-minute documentary called Tracking the Jersey Man-Eater. It was produced by the George Marine Library in 1991; however, it was never widely released.

The attacks at Matawan are the subject of the National Geographic Channel documentary Attacks of the Mystery Shark (2002), which examines the possibility that a bull shark was responsible for killing Stanley Fisher and Lester Stilwell; Discovery Channel's Blood in the Water (2009); Shore Thing (2009) (directed by Lovari and James Hill); and the Smithsonian Channel's The Real Story: Jaws (2011).

== See also ==
- List of fatal shark attacks in the United States
- Summer of the Shark
- 2010 Sharm El Sheikh shark attacks

== Bibliography ==
- Allen, Thomas B. (1996) [1963]. Shadows in the Sea: The Sharks, Skates, and Rays. Guilford, Connecticut: The Lyons Press. ISBN 1-55821-518-2.
- Capuzzo, Michael (2001). Close to Shore: A True Story of Terror in an Age of Innocence. New York: Broadway Books. ISBN 978-0-7679-0413-1.
- Ellis, Richard (1983). The Book of Sharks. San Diego: Harcourt Brace Jovanovich. ISBN 0-15-613552-3.
- Fernicola, Richard G. (2002). Twelve Days of Terror: A Definitive Investigation of the 1916 New Jersey Shark Attacks. Guilford, Connecticut: The Lyons Press. ISBN 1-58574-575-8.
