= Michael Capuzzo =

American journalist and author

- Born: May 1, 1957 (age 69); Boston, Massachusetts, U.S.
- Education: Northwestern University; Goucher College
- Occupations: Journalist, author
- Writing career
- Notable work: Close to Shore
- Website: www.michaelcapuzzo.net

Michael Capuzzo (born May 1, 1957) is an American journalist and author best known for his New York Times-bestselling nonfiction books The Murder Room and Close to Shore He was formerly a reporter with the Miami Herald and the Philadelphia Inquirer, where he received four Pulitzer Prize nominations. The Murder Room, the true story of a private dining club of famous detectives who solve cold murders, and Close to Shore, an historic thriller and recreation of the first American shark attack in World War I-era New Jersey, both enjoyed wide acclaim from critics and authors such as Gay Talese, Mark Bowden, John Sanford, and Michael Connelly.

== Early life and education ==
Capuzzo was born in Boston, Massachusetts, on May 1, 1957, and raised in the Greater Boston area. He attended Northwestern University, where he studied journalism.

== Career ==
Capuzzo began his career as a reporter with the Miami Herald, where he worked for six years. He then joined The Philadelphia Inquirer, where he worked from 1986 to 1994 before becoming a freelance writer. In 1997, he married Teresa Banik, a food critic for Philadelphia Magazine. Formerly a resident of Wenonah, New Jersey, Capuzzo and his wife relocated to Wellsboro, Pennsylvania in 2004. In 2006, he and his wife founded Mountain Home, a monthly magazine serving the Twin Tiers and New York Finger Lakes regions. He earned an MFA in creative nonfiction from Goucher College in 2011, during which time he completed The Murder Room and was mentored by Pulitzer Prize-winning journalist Thomas French.

Capuzzo authored Our Best Friends: Wagging Tales to Warm the Heart in 1999. It presents true stories of people and their dogs, including cases of heroism.

The Murder Room, published in a number of countries, was one of five finalists for the CWA Gold Dagger for Non-Fiction given by the British Crime Writer's Association for the best true crime book by any writer of any nationality published in England in 2010 or 2011. A TV series based on the book was in development as of 2011, to be written by George Nolfi and produced by Carol Mendelsohn, of CSI: Crime Scene Investigation.

Capuzzo was interviewed several times on NPR about the book, including Fresh Air with Terry Gross, and the book was the subject of an ABC News primetime hour-long special of 20/20 in September 2010. The book was named "The Big Read" at Coastal Carolina University.

Capuzzo has appeared nationwide as a keynote speaker and at colleges talking about writing; at Rutgers University, he taught an honors colloquium.

== Works ==
- The Murder Room: The Heirs of Sherlock Holmes Gather to Solve the World's Most Perplexing Cold Cases (2010).
- Close to Shore: A True Story of Terror in an Age of Innocence (2002)
- Mutts: America's Dogs (with Brian Kilcommons) (2001)
- Cat Caught My Heart : Purrfect Tales of Wisdom, Hope, and Love (edited with Teresa Banik Capuzzo, 1999)
- Our Best Friends : Wagging Tales to Warm the Heart (edited with Teresa Banik Capuzzo, 1999)
- Wild Things: The Wacky and Wonderful Truth about the Animal Kingdom (1995)
