= Twelve Days of Terror =

Book by Richard G. Fernicola

- First edition cover
- Author: Richard G. Fernicola
- Language: English
- Subject: Jersey Shore shark attacks of 1916; History of New Jersey
- Publisher: Lyons Press
- Publication date: 2001
- Publication place: United States
- Media type: Paperback
- Pages: 330
- ISBN: 1-58574-575-8 (paperback)
- OCLC: 50421954

Twelve Days of Terror: A Definitive Investigation of the 1916 New Jersey Shark Attacks is a non-fiction book by Richard G. Fernicola about the Jersey Shore shark attacks of 1916. The book was published in 2001 by Lyons Press.

== Overview ==
Fernicola offers an in-depth investigation of the shark attacks of 1916 plus modern-day attacks. He interviewed people connected with the victims of the attacks and examines the arguments and conclusions of contemporary and modern scientists to determine the species of the shark involved in the attacks.

== Film ==
The book was made into an episode of the History Channel's documentary series In Search of... titled Shark Attack 1916 (2001) and the Discovery Channel's docudrama 12 Days of Terror in 2004.
