= Wendy Benchley =

American environmental conservationist

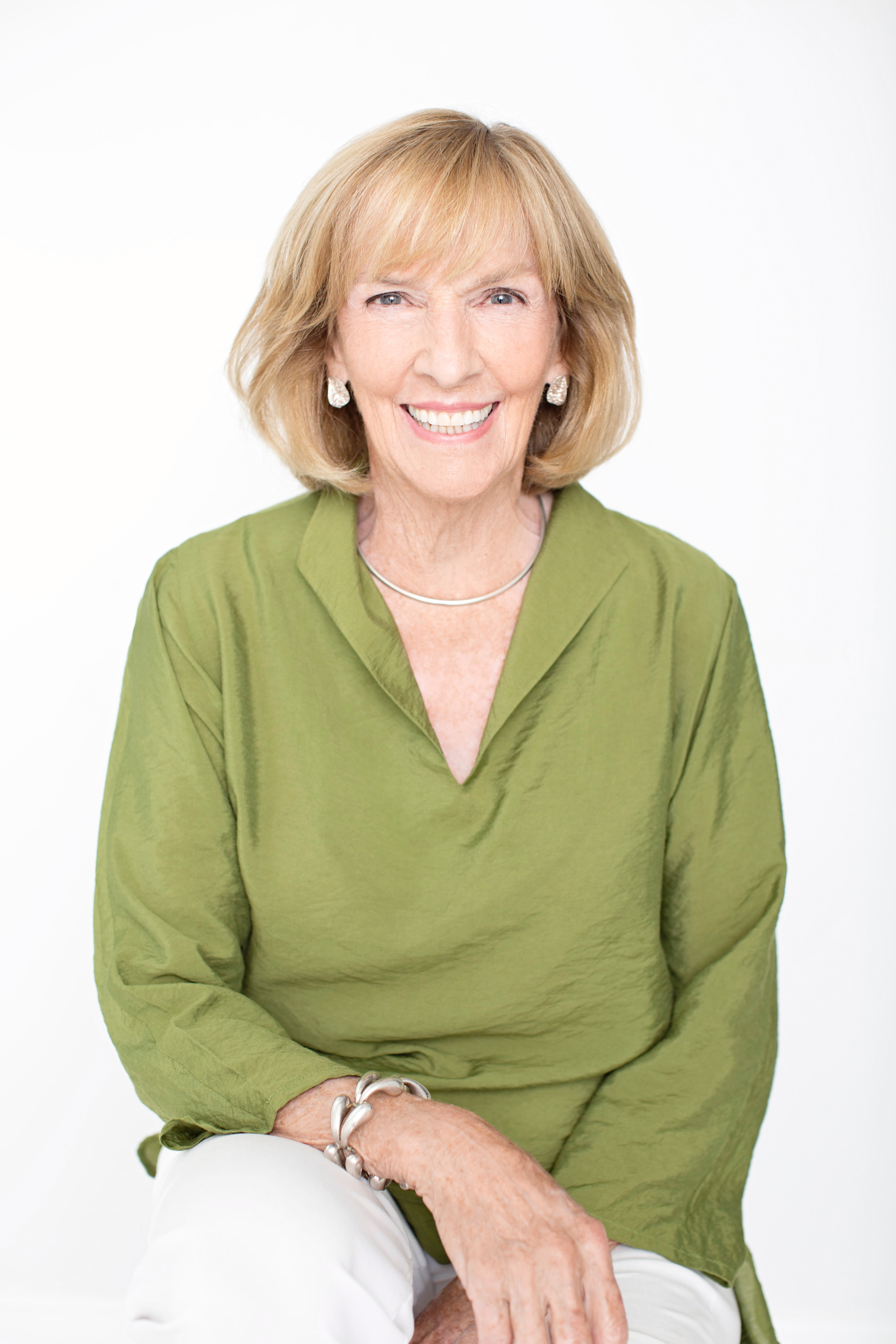
- Benchley in 2019
- Born: Winifred Wesson; February 4, 1941 (age 84); Montclair, New Jersey, U.S.
- Occupations: Ocean conservationist, environmental activist, former councilwoman
- Spouses: Peter Benchley (m. 1964; died 2006) John Jeppson III (m. 2011)
- Children: 3

Winifred "Wendy" Benchley (née Wesson; born February 4, 1941) is a marine and environmental conservation advocate and former councilwoman from New Jersey. She is known for co-founding various environmental organizations and for being the wife of author Peter Benchley.

== Early life ==
Wendy Wesson was born and raised in Montclair, New Jersey, to Harrison and Dorcas Wesson. Harrison Wesson was a surgeon and served in the Philippines during WWII. Wendy Wesson graduated from Montclair High School in 1959, after which she did a grand tour of Europe with her family.

Wesson continued her studies at Skidmore College where she majored in philosophy and psychology. While in college, Benchley became involved in activism and was arrested for picketing Woolworth in Saratoga Springs in protest of the department store's segregation policy.

== Political and environmental activism ==
While in Pennington, New Jersey, Peter Benchley wrote the novel Jaws, which became a critical and commercial success. The process of researching ‘Jaws’ and the aftermath of the novel's success and film adaptation left both Peter and Wendy Benchley with a profound interest in sharks and ocean conservation. The couple subsequently became involved in conservation efforts and traveled internationally to meet with researchers and go cage diving with sharks. Wendy Benchley served as a board member of the Environmental Defense Fund (EDF) from 1986 to 2006 and Peter was an EDF spokesperson. They made appearances together to speak about protecting sharks and conservation.

Peter Benchley recalled his wife saving his life in 1974 during a televised cage diving expedition in the Neptune Islands off Australia. Unnoticed by the boat crew, the great white shark being filmed got its teeth entangled in the rope by which Peter Benchley's cage was suspended and was struggling to break free. Wendy was the only one on board the boat to notice, and she successfully attempted to free the rope from the shark's mouth before it was severed.

Wendy Benchley later became active in environmentalism and grassroots political causes outside of marine conservation, co-founding the New Jersey Environmental Federation and becoming involved in New Jersey politics. During this time she advocated for green energy and environmental reforms.

Wendy was elected to the Mercer County Board of Chosen Freeholders in 1992, before being elected to the Princeton Borough Council for three terms, from 1999 to 2008 before leaving New Jersey politics to focus on ocean conservation.

=== 2006–present ===
Peter Benchley died of pulmonary fibrosis on February 11, 2006, at the couple's home in Princeton, New Jersey. Wendy Benchley, along with David Helvarg, co-founded the Peter Benchley Ocean Awards in 2008 to honor the memory of the late Peter Benchley. Referred to as “the Academy Awards of the ocean”, the Peter Benchley Ocean Awards recognize outstanding achievements in the area of ocean conservation. The awards were originally a project of Blue Frontier but they later became a separate organization headed by Benchley and Helvarg.

In addition to taking part in hosting and nominating recipients of the Peter Benchley Ocean Awards, Benchley has continued to advocate for marine conservation in other arenas. Benchley is an advisory trustee of the EDF, president of the board of SharkSavers, and a board member of WildAid and Blue Frontier Campaign. Benchley helped to facilitate the merger between SharkSavers and WildAid in 2014, which saw both organizations focus their resources on campaigns against sharkfin soup consumption, a leading cause of shark fishing.

Benchley has supported organizations such as the Aspen Institute High Seas Initiative and the Coral Reefs on the High Seas Initiative to implement new marine conservation policies. Benchley supported BiteBack's advocacy against irresponsible media coverage of sharks and the sale of shark products such as shark fin soup and shark steaks.

== Awards and recognition ==
Benchley was awarded the 2014 SeaKeeper Award and was inducted into the Women Divers Hall of Fame in 2015. Benchley received the 2016 Beneath the Sea, Diver of the Year Award for environmentalism and 2017 Pegasus Wings Awards for her lifetime achievements as an ocean conservationist. In 2019 she was awarded the Rob Stewart Foundation Lifetime Achievement for Ocean Conservation Award.

== Personal life ==
Wendy Wesson met Peter Benchley at the Jared Coffin House in Nantucket in 1963, and the two were married the following year. The couple had their first child, a daughter named Tracy, in 1967. They later had a son named Clayton in 1969, and a third child, Christopher, in 1987.

In 2011, Benchley married John Jepson III, the grandson of industrialist John Jeppson. They reside in Washington, D.C..

== Filmography ==
=== Film ===
Year	Film	Role	Notes
2007	The Shark Is Still Working: The Impact & Legacy of 'Jaws'	Participant	Documentary
2007	Diving Into 'Blue Water, White Death'	Participant	Video documentary
2010	Jaws: The Inside Story	Herself	TV documentary
2012	How ‘Jaws’ Changed the World	Herself	TV documentary
2025	Jaws @ 50: The Definitive Inside Story	Herself	Documentary; also producer

=== Television ===
Year	Work	Role	Notes
2014	Nova	Herself	Episode: "Why Sharks Attack"
