= Beast (Benchley novel) =

1991 novel by Peter Benchley

- First edition
- Author: Peter Benchley
- Language: English
- Genre: Horror
- Publisher: Random House (US); Hutchinson (UK)
- Publication date: 1991
- Publication place: United States
- Media type: Print
- Preceded by: Rummies
- Followed by: White Shark

Beast is a 1991 novel by Peter Benchley, the author of Jaws.

== Plot ==
A fishing community in Bermuda is disrupted by a series of mysterious disappearances at sea, including wealthy couple Howard and Elizabeth Griffin, a sperm whale calf, and scuba divers Scott and Susie Manning. When veteran fisherman Whip Darling discovers two large hooks or claws at the scene of the Manning attack, he advises Lieutenant Marcus Sharpe, a local Navy pilot, that the culprit is Architeuthis dux: a giant squid.

Herbert Talley, a marine biologist, also guesses the truth after the Mannings' deaths. He convinces Osborne Manning, the millionaire father of Scott and Susie, to fund a hunt for the creature. Local mayor Liam St. John attempts to overrule all parties and participates in an exploratory mission using a mini submarine, but is killed when the creature destroys the vessel, along with Mike Newcombe, Whip's first mate, and Stephanie Carr, Marcus's love interest.

Although reluctant to participate any further, Whip is blackmailed by Manning, who has assumed ownership of Whip's outstanding mortgage. Leaving wife Charlotte and daughter Dana at home, Whip embarks on a new hunt with Marcus, Talley, and Manning. Manning is later killed in an accident. In an attempt to trap the creature, Talley lures it using hormones cultivated from a pair of dead giant squid. The trap fails, and the enraged squid attacks their vessel, killing Talley. Whip wounds the creature with an explosive Marcus and he had made, but the creature survives. Before the squid can kill them, however, an adult sperm whale (presumably the mother of the squid's earlier victim) arrives and kills it.

Whip’s vessel sinks from the damage, but Whip and Marcus survive on a floating piece of debris, which is driven back to land by the current. However, they are unaware that a large number of the squid's offspring have survived, and, due to intense overfishing wiping out their predators, will grow to adulthood unchallenged.

== Adaptation ==
Beast was adapted into a TV movie, The Beast in 1996, starring William Petersen as Whip.

Some alterations were made from the novel:

- The squid is killed by an explosion instead of a whale.
- Marcus's character is female.
- Whip's surname is changed from Darling to Dalton.
- Manning is unrelated to any of the squid's victims and only wants it as an exhibit for an ocean park.
- Whip's teenaged daughter has a subplot.
- The setting is changed from Bermuda to the Pacific Northwest.

Otherwise the film is regarded as faithful to the source material. The film was well received and earned high ratings, both earning a nomination in the Daytime Emmy Awards and encouraging future adaptations of Benchley's other works, such as White Shark being adapted as Creature in 1998.

== See also ==
- Giant squid in popular culture
