= White Shark (novel) =

1994 novel by Peter Benchley

- Author: Peter Benchley
- Language: English
- Publication date: 1994
- Publication place: United States
- Media type: Print
- Preceded by: Beast

White Shark is a 1994 novel by author Peter Benchley, famous for Jaws, The Island, Beast, and The Deep. White Shark is similar to Jaws but does not feature a shark, let alone a white shark, despite what the title suggests; the phrase is the codename of a weapon. To avoid confusion and to capitalize on the miniseries adaptation, the book was republished as Creature in 1997.

== Plot ==
At the close of World War II, Nazi scientist Ernst Kruger perfects a biological weapon he calls der Weisse Hai ('the White Shark'). The weapon is packed in a casket-like box and loaded aboard a German submarine to escape the Allied capture of Germany. When the submarine is attacked and sunk in the Atlantic Ocean, everyone onboard (including Kruger) and the box containing the casket are lost at sea.

Decades later, unsuspecting divers discover the wreckage of the German submarine and recover the box, becoming the der Weisse Hai's first victims and inadvertently releasing it into the waters off Long Island, where it kills sea mammals, pets, and random people. The novel's protagonist is a marine biologist, Dr. Simon Chase. Chase examines several of the victims' corpses and concludes that the attacker can not be a sea creature, since its teeth and claws leave metallic traces. He receives assistance from Dr. Amanda Mays, another marine biologist who is visiting to observe gray whales and uses cameras mounted on trained sea lions to aid in this observation.

The creature's exact nature is not described or revealed until near the climax, when Jacob Franks, a Holocaust survivor, tracks down Chase and reveals he was forced to assist Kruger's experiments to create an amphibious human to act as the ultimate commando soldier. All of Kruger's test subjects were too weak to survive the experiments, until he was given a psychotic SS officer and ex-Olympic triathlete. The subject was surgically altered and psychologically manipulated into becoming der Weisse Hai, including the implantation of steel claws and teeth. Before sealing him into the box, Kruger also put the hybrid creature into a hibernation state, which enabled him to survive the decades following the war. Franks also explains that Kruger had taught the creature to drain his lungs and breathe air, but not how to reverse the process, meaning that once the creature comes ashore, he will be unable to return to the water. Alarmed, Chase reveals to Franks that this has already occurred.

Chase and his helper lure der Weisse Hai into a decompression chamber and explode him.

== Miniseries adaptation ==
White Shark was adapted into Creature, a 1997 TV miniseries. Its setting was changed from a science laboratory to a top secret island military base. Additionally, instead of an amphibious human, the titular creature was redesigned as a human and great white shark hybrid capable of evolving legs, arms, and lungs.

Creature stars Craig T. Nelson as Simon Chase and Kim Cattrall as Dr. Amanda Mason (instead of Macy). It was primarily filmed on the Caribbean island of St. Lucia and in Vancouver. To take advantage of the miniseries' publicity and to avoid confusion with sharks, the book was republished as Creature in 1997.

== Reception ==
A review in Kirkus Reviews found the book was efficiently told but predictable. Timothy Foote, writing for The New York Times, was more negative and found the whole novel to be a mere recycling and assemblage of worn-out fictional elements amid personal clichéd reflections on environment.
