= Frank Mundus =

American fisherman (1925–2008)

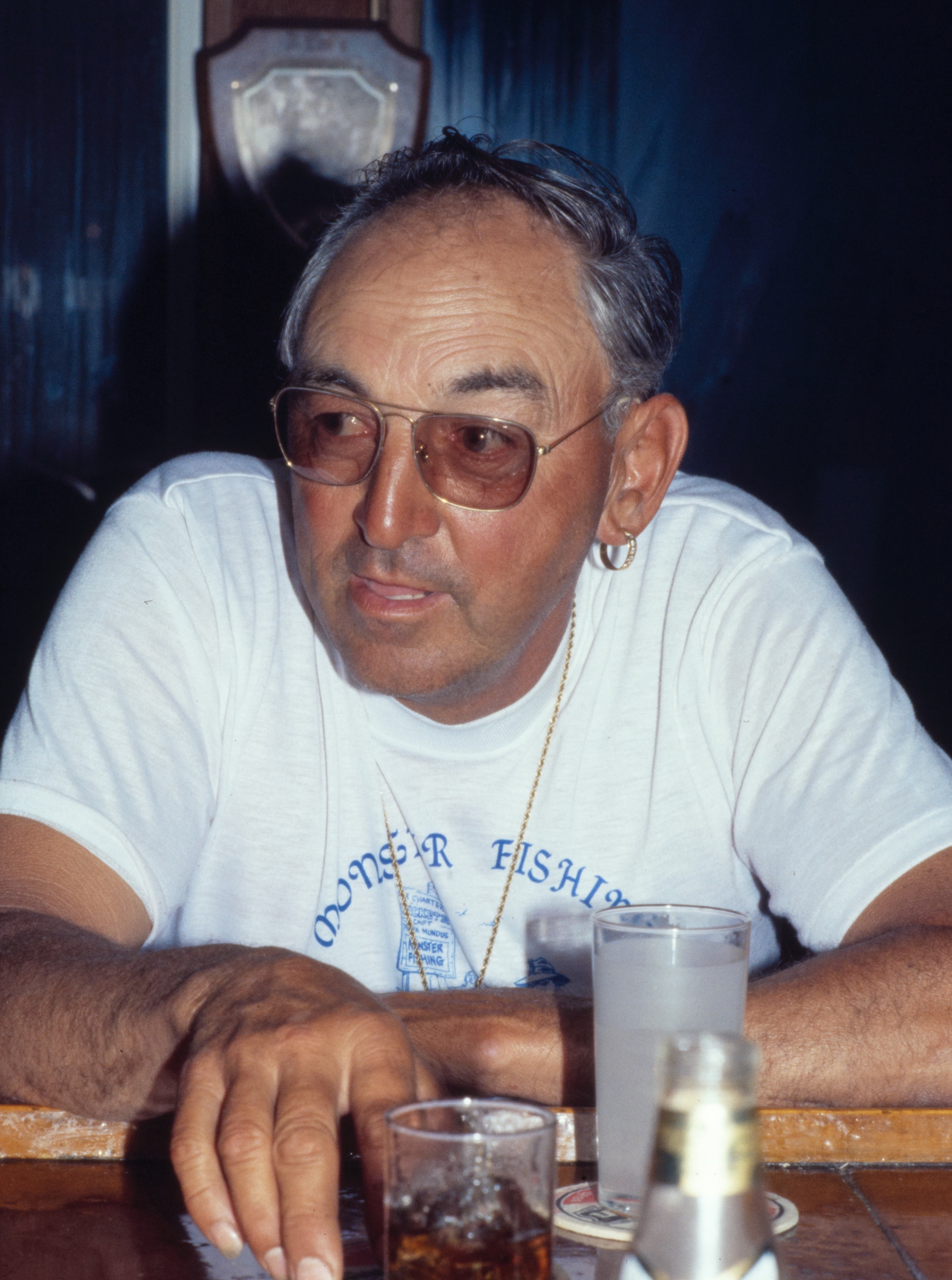
- Mundus in 1978
- Born: October 21, 1925; Long Branch, New Jersey, US
- Died: September 10, 2008 (aged 82); Honolulu, Hawaii, US
- Occupation: Fisherman
- Known for: Inspiration for the character Quint in Jaws
- Spouse: Jeanette Mundus

Frank Mundus (October 21, 1925 – September 10, 2008) was an American fisherman and charter captain based in Montauk, New York who is said to be the inspiration for the character Quint in the book and movie Jaws. He started out as a shark hunter but later became a shark conservationist. Up until his death, he chartered out his boat Cricket II for those seeking the thrill of big game fishing.

Mundus' early techniques, which included killing whales merely for chum and harpooning sharks (practices which are outlawed today), earned him criticism even at the time. In the last few years of his life, Mundus campaigned for shark fishermen to catch and release their prey, even going as far as to publish a conservation book titled White Shark Sam Meets The Monster Man.

Mundus died on September 10, 2008, in Honolulu due to complications from a heart attack he suffered on September 6, the day he returned home to Hawaii after spending the summer in Montauk. According to his obituary he spent the last night in Montauk aboard the Cricket II which made him famous and had his heart attack in the Hawaii airport immediately after returning.

== Early life ==
Mundus was born in Long Branch, New Jersey, and moved to Brooklyn when he was young. In 1945 he began a charter fishing operation in Brielle, New Jersey, with the Cricket. In 1947, he had the Cricket II custom-built.

== The Pelican ==
Mundus moved to Montauk in 1951 saying he wanted to start charters for bluefish. In his first year at Montauk, he played an important role in the rescue and retrieval of the Pelican, an overloaded party boat in which 45 of 64 on board perished after capsizing in a squall, including its captain Eddie Carroll. He was among the second wave of searchers, and helped tow the hull of the Pelican to port with ten dead bodies still trapped inside. The disaster was the worst in Montauk recreational history and led to numerous laws regulating the industry.

== Monster Fish ==
Mundus soon discovered that bluefish were not plentiful in Montauk waters, but sharks were.

Mundus started what he called "Monster Fishing" with boats leaving the port at Lake Montauk. Mundus with his colorful character became immediately popular. He further helped his reputation by catching a 4,500 pound great white shark by harpoon (the weight was estimated without the shark having been weighed). In 1986 he and Donnie Braddick caught a 3,427-pound great white about 28 miles off Montauk, and only 18 miles from Block Island, which still holds the record, not only for the largest shark, but for the largest fish of any kind ever caught by rod and reel. The capture of the shark was controversial at the time, with some saying the shark was feeding on a whale when caught (which would have negated the so-called "official record"). The International Game Fishing Association ruled that the catch was legitimate based on photographs.

The monster shark known as "the largest fish ever caught on rod and reel" was sold to the 'Shipwreck Bar and grille' restaurant in Jupiter, Florida where it hung over the bar for almost 20 years. In 2021 The shark was sold to a private "Jaws" collector, David Dearth who lives on the Treasure Coast of Florida where the "Mundus Shark" remains today.

In 1991 the U.S. Coast Guard said that Mundus' license had expired and he had to reapply. He initially attempted to sell the Cricket II and moved to Hawaii. The sale did not go through although the boat was operated by others. He officially retired as a charter captain in 1997. In the years before his death he returned to Montauk for its shark tournaments and rode along on higher priced Cricket II excursions. He died in Hawaii shortly after returning from Montauk.

== Colorful character ==
Mundus' reputation was enhanced by his eccentric personality and ostentatious displays of the killed sharks (something he later regretted). "He always said the charter business was 90 percent show and 10 percent go," said Chris Miller, a Montauk resident who had seen him on the docks. He colored his big toenails red and green for port and starboard. He wore a hoop earring and an Australian slouch hat and a shark tooth necklace.

In 2005, he appeared in Shark Hunter: Chasing the Great White, a Shark Week documentary, which was narrated by actor Roy Scheider, who played Martin Brody in Jaws and Jaws II. The special told of Mundus' early career, how he became the inspiration for Quint, his world record capture, and how he turned from shark hunter to shark conservationist. Mundus also joined Chris Fallows and other shark conservationists in viewing great whites in their natural habitat. In one such viewing of the breaching great whites (made famous in the Air Jaws series of specials), during which Fallows brought out a seal decoy he had humorously named "Frank" after Mundus (a hat like the ones Mundus usually wore was even added to it) and they used it to fool them into breaching.

He said that the name of his boat was inspired by the fact that his profile resembled that of Jiminy Cricket.

== Inspiration for Quint in Jaws ==
Mundus is often said to be the inspiration for charter captain Quint in the book and film Jaws. The novel's author, Peter Benchley says that Mundus was the inspiration but Mundus was not notably credited as a source in the movie.

Nevertheless, Montauk residents have said that Mundus was definitely the inspiration for the character. John Ebel, a mate on the Cricket II said that Benchley had privately acknowledged that Mundus was the inspiration but had publicly denied the association for legal reasons. They note the following:

- Mundus and Benchley had gone on shark hunting expeditions out of Montauk prior to the 1974 novel and were filmed together aboard the Cricket II in a 1974 episode of American Sportsman.
- In the book the fictional Jaws community of Amity Island is described as being between Bridgehampton, New York and East Hampton, New York, the latter the location of Montauk.
- Quint's boat was said to be berthed at a place called "Promised Land." Mundus' boat at one time was docked at the fish factory called Promised Land in Napeague, New York immediately west of Montauk.
- Joe Gaviola, a Montauk businessman, was quoted as saying "He is Quint. If you read the book, he was everything Frank was. Benchley spent weeks fishing with him. Give me a break. He is Quint."
- Both Frank and Quint possessed a hatred for the two-way radio.

In comparisons to his character in Jaws, his website quotes him:

What did you think about the movie Jaws?

It was the funniest and the stupidest movie I've ever seen because too many stupid things happened in it. For instance, no shark can pull a boat backwards at a fast speed with a light line and stern cleats that are only held in there by two bolts. And I've never boiled shark jaws. If you do, you'll only end up with a bunch of teeth at the bottom of your bucket because the jaw cartilage melts.

Is it true that the shark hunter "Quint" in Jaws is based on you? In what ways does he resemble you?

Yes, he was. He knew how to handle the people the same way I did. He also used similar shark fishing techniques based on my methods. The only difference was that I used hand held harpoons after field-testing harpoon guns and discovering that they didn't work: the dart would pull out after hitting the fish.

== Bibliography ==
- Fifty Years a Hooker - ISBN 978-1-4134-8428-1 - 2005
- White Shark Sam Meets the Monster Man - ISBN 978-1-59926-099-0 - 2005 (coloring book)
- Sportfishing for Sharks - ISBN 978-0-02-587950-8 - 1971
