= Roger Kastel =

American artist (1931–2023)

- Kastel in 1957
- Born: June 11, 1931; White Plains, New York, U.S.
- Died: November 8, 2023 (aged 92); Worcester, Massachusetts, U.S.
- Occupation: Artist
- Spouse: Grace Kastel (1957-2023)
- Website: rogerkastel.com

Roger Kastel (June 12, 1931 – November 8, 2023) was an American artist, best known for creating the posters for the films Jaws (1975) and The Empire Strikes Back (1980).

== Personal life ==
Roger Karl Kastel was born in White Plains, New York on June 11, 1931, to Karl and Anna Kastel. His father was a jewelry designer. Both of his parents painted as a hobby, and Roger developed an interest in drawing at a young age. One of his earliest influences was Tom Hickey, a cartoonist, comic book artist and illustrator of pulp magazine covers for National Comics Publications/D.C. Comics and Dell Comics who was a neighbor in White Plains. After graduating from White Plains High School, Kastel commuted to Manhattan as a teenager to attend classes at the Art Students League of New York, a nonprofit school that includes Frederic Remington, Georgia O'Keeffe and Winslow Homer among its alumni. He joined the United States Navy for four years during the Korean War and served in Hawaii and California. In California he met Grace Trowbridge, originally from Bethel, Connecticut, whom he married after he left the Navy. The couple returned to New York. He and Grace lived in Greenwich Village with their two children until 1970 when they moved to Clove Valley in Dutchess County, New York. In a 200-year old barn which he had converted into a studio Kastel created both the Jaws and Empire Strikes Back illustrations. In 2013 he and Grace moved to Milford, Massachusetts. He was married to Grace Kastel from 1957 until his death in 2023. Their two children are Beth Krebs and Matthew Kastel, who is the Stadium Manager for Oriole Park at Camden Yards, home of the Baltimore Orioles and Past President of the Stadium Managers Association. Roger Kastel died of kidney and heart failure in Worcester, Massachusetts, on November 8, 2023, at the age of 92.

== Career ==
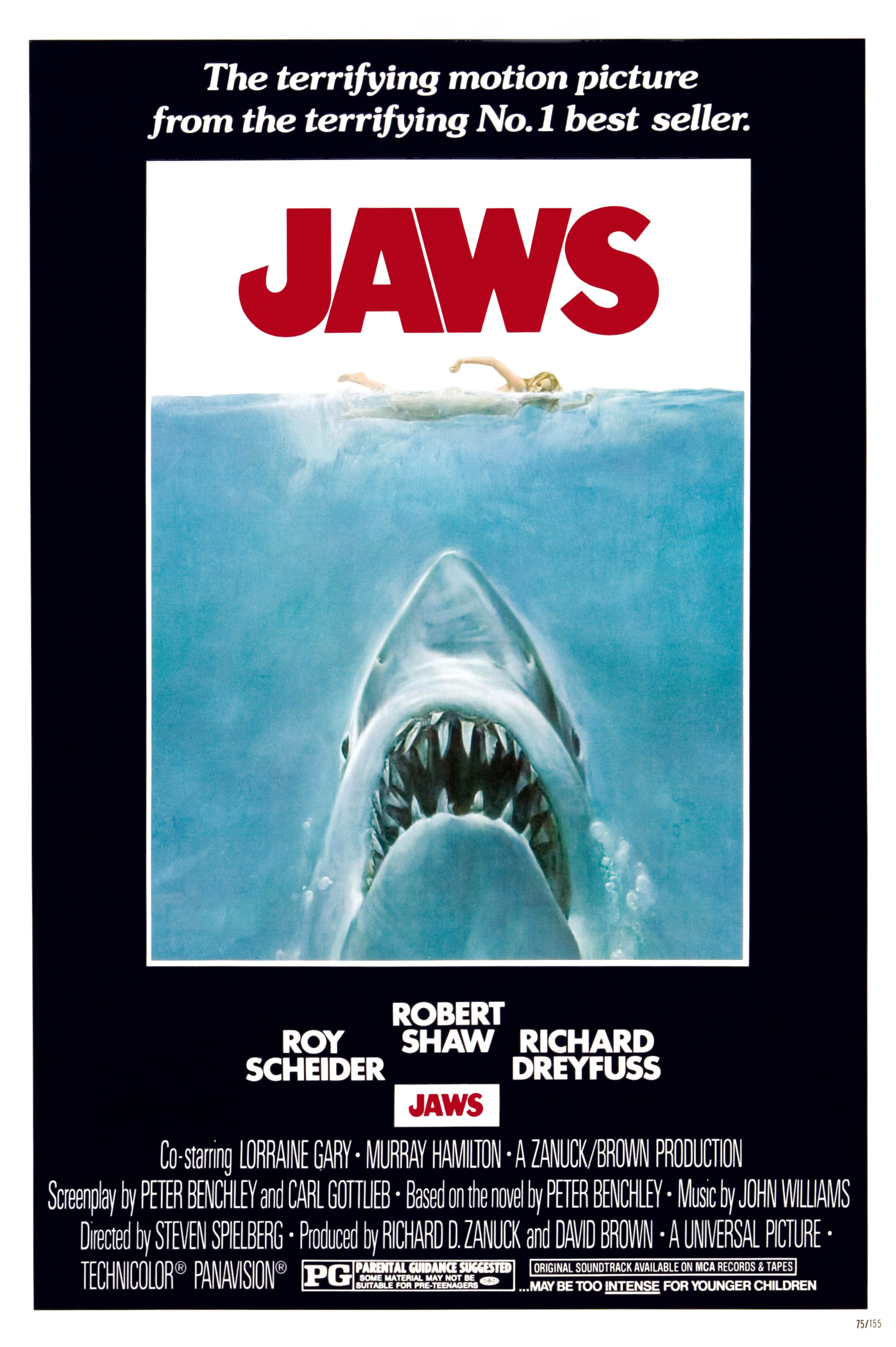
Film poster for Jaws (1975)

Kastel's first professional job came at age 15, when he designed a pamphlet at Hickey's request showing industrial workers how to use equipment properly. He was a student at the Art Students League of New York while in high school, and then again after serving in the Navy during the Korean War. While in school, he studied with Sidney E. Dickinson, Edwin Dickinson, Robert Beverly Hale, and especially Frank Reilly, who had been an apprentice to Dean Cornwell.

In New York he took various jobs including working in an art studio. He eventually landed a job drawing cartoons for Reddy Kilowatt (an electronic advertising company). He sold his first paperback book cover illustration in the 1960s to Pocket Books. A painting of his that was made into a fire safety poster won first prize from the National Board of Fire Underwriters. In the 1960s Kastel did illustrations for western paperbacks and Argosy Magazine and illustrated paperback covers for several publishing companies including Simon and Schuster, HarperCollins, and Harlequin Books, before signing an exclusive contract with Bantam Books in 1967. It was here that Kastel had his greatest success, painting the iconic paperback book cover for Jaws, which was later used as the movie poster for the 1975 Spielberg film adaptation.

== Jaws Bantam Books cover (1974) and movie poster (1975) ==
Author Peter Benchley envisaged a cover for his novel Jaws that depicted a peaceful coastal town framed by the jaws of a shark. Alex Gotfryd, the design director at his publisher, Doubleday, assigned the concept to book illustrator Wendell Minor. Minor's cover was ultimately rejected because of its resemblance to a toothed vagina (vagina dentata) (see Jaws (novel)). The revised cover for the Doubleday edition had no image, just the author's name at the top and "JAWS" in white lettering against a black background (with "A Novel" in red lettering underneath). 300,000 copies of the book with the typographical jacket were printed in early 1974. However, Oscar Dystel, president of Bantam Books, who owned the paperback rights, was not happy with the hardback cover. "It could have been a book about dentistry," he said. He asked the book's editor, Thomas Congdon, to put a shark on the jacket. Minor was out of town, so Gotfryd commissioned artist Paul Bacon to do a new cover. With prompting from Gotfryd to add a swimmer to Bacon's original idea of an enormous head of a shark, Bacon completed a jacket illustration with an open-jawed shark's head rising towards a swimming woman. Dystel was pleased, although Congdon thought that the new cover "looked like a penis with teeth." The original purely typographical dust jackets that had been printed were never used. For the hardback edition, the dust jacket with Bacon's illustration was used instead. However, Dystel wanted to design a new cover for the paperback edition of Jaws. According to Kastel, "I had just delivered a painting to Bantam's art director, Len Leone. ... I was sitting in Len's office when Oscar Dystel, Bantam's publisher, came in. He said, "Wait a minute. Don't leave. I have a great book for you to read." And he ran out and came back with 'Jaws.'" Dystel wanted Kastel to read the book and pick out a part of it to illustrate. However, Kastel thought that the best part of the novel was the beginning when the late-night skinny dipper Chrissie Watkins is attacked by the great white shark. "The only direction Oscar and Len gave me was to make the to make the shark bigger, and very realistic." Kastel went to the American Museum of Natural History. They didn't have any photos of sharks that he could use so he asked if they had a shark exhibit. They said that they did but that it was closed for cleaning. "It was lunchtime, so I went upstairs anyway, and there were all these different stuffed sharks, just laying on boards. I had my camera with me so I took a few pictures. The shark in my painting developed from there. I just tried to paint a ferocious-looking shark that was still realistic." The stuffed shark that ended up being the model for his painting was a short-fin mako shark, which was chosen for its array of teeth. The mako shark belongs to the same family of sharks as the great white, so it is a close relative. The shark is still held in the Ichthyology Collection in the museum.

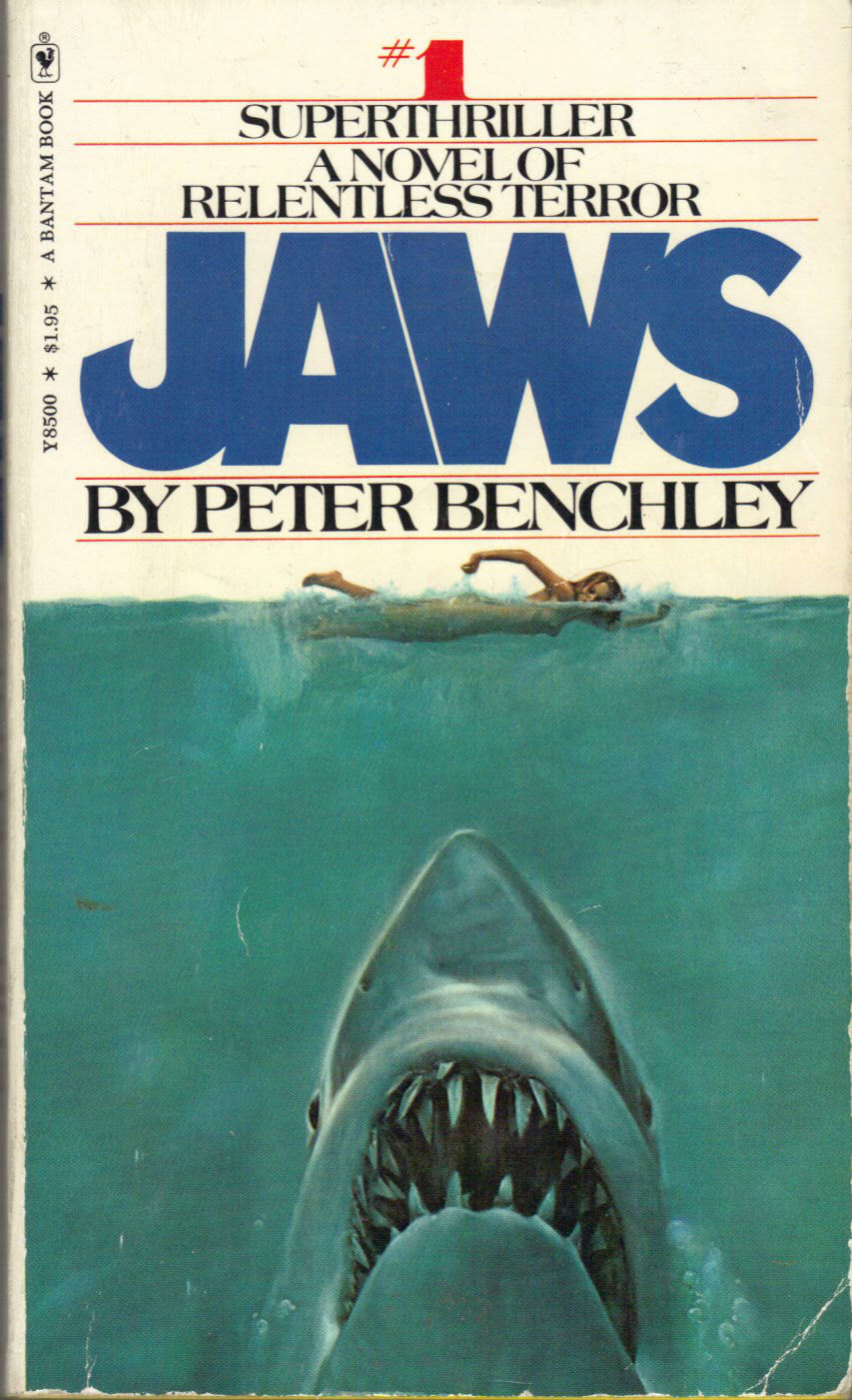
Bantam Books requested a new cover for the paperback edition, and the now iconic artwork by Roger Kastel was reused for the Jaws film posters.

A 24-year-old Wilhelmina model, Allison Maher, who had moved from Ohio to New York that summer, was hired to pose for photographs. She went to the studio of the photographer on Fourth Avenue, and lay across two stools simulating doing a front crawl as photographs were taken of her. Kastel was in the studio, shouting "Swim faster! or "Look out, shark!" This was one of Maher's first jobs and she was paid $35 for one hour. Speaking to the New York Post, Maher, who became Allison Maher Stern, a wildlife advocate and philanthropist, said "I knew it was a book cover and that was it." About the book cover and the movie poster she said, "If you know me, you can tell it's me." She was not recognized, however, despite the poster for the movie being on a giant billboard on Times Square. "I think everyone assumed the girl swimming was the girl from the movie."

Kastel painted the oil painting on Masonite. It did not take him too long. Bantam used Kastel's oil-on-board painting for the paperback cover, but it proved controversial due to the woman's nudity. It was banned in Boston and St. Petersburg. Although Kastel worried that the backlash over the paperback cover would end his career as an illustrator, Bantam loved the publicity of the book being banned because of the cover.

Universal Pictures liked the artwork of the Bantam edition of the book enough to use it – free of charge – as the poster for the movie's advertising and marketing campaign. However, Seiniger Advertising made subtle changes to the artwork (see Jaws (film)). The swimmer's nudity was strategically obscured with sea foam to comply with the Motion Picture Association of America's rules for movie posters, and blue of the water was lightened. Also, they fine-tuned the font for "JAWS", separating the "J" and the "S", and they changed the color of the font to red. This was the first time that a poster image became a merchandising product in itself. The paperback sales of Jaws had reached three million but they had started to wane when the movie Jaws came out in June 1975. It became the first summer blockbuster. By the end of October, six million more copies had been sold. It was an industry speed record at the time.

Speaking to a reporter in 2015, Kastel said "What really bothered me was that they used the image for merchandising. You see that poster on everything."

Kastel's original painting toured bookstores and made other appearances. However, the last time he saw his painting was at the exhibit, "200 Years of American Illustration", at the New York Historical Society in 1976. After that it went back to Hollywood. Kastel got a phone call from the Universal Studios Art Director letting him know that it had won a gold medal at an art show, but the painting was never seen again, despite later efforts by Dystel to get it back from Universal. "I don't know if it was stolen or thrown out or someone has it," Kastel told a reporter in 2015. Preparatory drawings for the poster, given to collector Chris Kiszka, still exist and were exhibited at Jaws: The Exhibition in the Marilyn and Jeffrey Kaztzenberg Gallery at the Academy Museum of Motion Pictures from September 14, 2025 to July 26, 2026, celebrating the fiftieth anniversary of the movie's release.

== Other movie posters ==
Kastel also did movie posters for films such as Doctor Faustus (1967 film), Doc Savage: The Man of Bronze (1975), The Great Train Robbery (1978), as well as the movie poster for George Lucas's The Empire Strikes Back (1980).

Kastel illustrated approximately 1,000 book covers over his career, including several best-selling books by Jackie Collins, such as Hollywood Wives, the best-selling Zen and The Art of Motorcycle Maintenance (1974), and The Great Santini (1976). He also created the cover art for the first issue of the Doc Savage comic book series from 1975.
