= The Beast (1996 film) =

1996 made for TV movie

- Based on: Beast by Peter Benchley
- Screenplay by: J. B. White
- Directed by: Jeff Bleckner
- Starring: William Petersen; Karen Sillas; Charles Martin Smith; Larry Drake; Ronald Guttman
- Music by: Don Davis
- Country of origin: United States
- Original language: English

Production
- Executive producer: Peter Benchley; Dan Wigutow
- Producer: Tana Nugent Jamieson
- Production locations: Patonga, New South Wales, Australia; Sydney
- Cinematography: Geoff Burton
- Editor: Tod Feuerman
- Running time: 176 minutes
- Production companies: MCA Television Entertainment; Dan Wigutow Productions; Michael R. Joyce Productions
- Budget: $12 million

Original release
- Network: NBC
- Release: April 28 – April 29, 1996

The Beast is a 1996 television movie starring William Petersen, Karen Sillas and Charles Martin Smith. Aired in two parts as a miniseries, the movie is based on the 1991 novel Beast by Jaws author Peter Benchley. The film is about a giant squid that attacks and kills several people when its food supply becomes scarce and its offspring is killed. It was filmed primarily in Sydney, New South Wales, Australia.

== Plot ==
The film opens with Howard and Elizabeth Griffin enjoying a romantic yacht journey near the Pacific Northwest resort community of Grave's Point. After a freak occurrence causes the yacht to sink, the two are forced to head for shore in a life raft, only to be attacked and eaten by an unseen creature. The next day, local fisherman Whip Dalton (William Petersen) and first mate Mike Newcombe (Sterling Macer, Jr.) find the empty life raft with a large claw stuck to it. Whip sends the claw to Portland Zoo to be analyzed, from where it is sent on to marine biologist Dr. Herbert Talley (Ronald Guttman) and his assistant, Christopher Lane (Murray Bartlett). The pair determine that the claw comes from the tentacle of a giant squid, and immediately head to Graves Point.

Mike and his wife, Nell (Adrienne-Joi Johnson), discover the mangled remains of a whale on the beach. Mike takes the remains to Whip, who informs him that a squid of immense size was responsible, both for the whale and for the Griffins' disappearance. After the squid kills two scuba divers exploring a shipwreck, harbor master Schuyler Graves (Charles Martin Smith) persuades Lucas Coven (Larry Drake), an alcoholic fisherman who engages in illegal trap fishing, to kill the squid, despite Whip's advice to leave it alone. Lucas succeeds in killing a large squid with makeshift depth charges, and hauls it back to port. Meanwhile, Lucas's sonar detects another, much larger squid following his boat in, but no one is monitoring it. The community hails Graves as a hero for defeating the squid, and the carcass is promptly sold to Osborne Manning (Denis Arndt), owner of Sea Land Texas in Houston.

When Whip and Talley are not allowed to examine the dead squid, Talley organizes a submersible expedition to explore the squid's habitat. Meanwhile, Manning's scientists determine that the squid, while of impressive size, is just a baby, only three months old, prompting Manning to ask, "If what we have here is a baby, where's his mama?" As if in answer, the mother squid attacks the submersible, killing everyone aboard, including Christopher. A furious Whip tells Graves to his face that he holds him responsible for the deaths. Whip's daughter Dana (Missy Crider), who had fallen in love with Christopher, makes Whip promise not to go out after the squid. A humiliated Graves blackmails Lucas, threatening to shut him down for trap fishing unless he fulfills his original contract. Meanwhile, Talley postulates to Whip that the mother squid is now killing out of vengeance rather than hunger, making her even more dangerous. Later, Manning offers Talley a job at Sea Land as chairman of his board, which Talley strongly considers.

Lucas resumes the hunt, his crew now including Mike, who had joined due to financial difficulties. After enduring stormy weather, Lucas is forced to head back to shore, intending to continue the hunt the next day. However, the squid attacks his boat before they make it far, incapacitating the crew and pulling the boat underwater. Whip, who has raced to the scene after learning of Mike's decision, finds that only Mike has survived, albeit seriously injured. After Mike's near-death, and another incident where the squid came ashore, Dana releases Whip from his promise. Whip finally agrees to hunt it down, but only if he can use his boat, and if Graves goes with him. He is also accompanied by Talley, Manning, and the coast guard's Lt. Kathryn Marcus (Karen Sillas), whom Whip has begun dating.

They plan to snare the squid, reel it in, and kill it with darts loaded with cyanide. The plan succeeds, and the squid appears dead, but when the ship's engine breaks down, Manning reveals that he filled the darts with tranquilizer so he could take the squid back to Houston alive. Graves tries to escape on a lifeboat as Whip cuts the squid loose just as it awakes. The squid chases down and kills Graves, then resumes the attack on Whip's boat, killing Manning and Talley. A Coast Guard helicopter arrives in time to pick up Kathryn and Whip. As he boards the helicopter, Whip uses an axe to chop open several extra fuel drums and has Kathryn use a flare gun to set his boat on fire. The squid is unable to escape as the boat explodes, killing it. The helicopter flies Whip and Kathryn back to shore, where they reunite with Dana.

== Cast ==
- William Petersen as Whip Dalton
- Karen Sillas as Lt. Kathryn Marcus
- Charles Martin Smith as Schuyler Graves
- Ronald Guttman as Dr. Herbert Talley
- Missy Crider as Dana Dalton
- Sterling Macer, Jr. as Mike Newcombe
- Denis Arndt as Osborne Manning
- Adrienne-Joi Johnson as Nell Newcombe
- Larry Drake as Lucas Coven
- Murray Bartlett as Christopher Lane
- Laura Vazquez as Hadley
- Robert Mammone as Ensign Raines
- David Webb as Jamison
- Marshall Napier as Commander Wallingford
- Les Hill as Spike
- Andrew Hill as Chowder
- David Field as Scranton
- Laurence Coy as Farmer
- David Argue as Bates
- Helen O'Connor as Maeve
- Chad Tyler as Howard Griffin
- Angie Milliken as Elizabeth Griffin
- Alan David Lee as Les
- Bruce Alexander as Corbin Jakes
- Scott McRae as Ebbets
- Matt Day as Cosgrove
- Justin Monjo as Lieutenant Henderson
- David Whitney as John Esterbrook
- Joe Petruzzi as Doctor
- Tyler Coppin as Harry
- Ken Radley as James
- Francine Bell as Newsreader
- Kyra Stempel as Wallingford's Secretary
- Rick Adam as Reporter 1
- Andrea Cunningham as Reporter 2
- Robert Echols as Crew Member 1
- Margie McCrea as Angie

== Differences from novel ==
This TV adaption based on Peter Benchley's novel of the same name is mostly faithful to the source material; but some changes were made for the sake of film locations and pacing. In the novel, the squid has much younger offspring which do not make an appearance until the end of the novel, and the titular squid is killed by a sperm whale, not by an explosion as in the movie. Many storylines and characters are added or changed in the TV adaptation. For one thing, the book took place in Bermuda while the movie took place in a Pacific Northwest community resort called Grave's Point. While still gigantic, the squid is smaller than portrayed in the book. While the movie has it at 66 ft (20 m) long, the book depicts the squid as being 100 ft (30 m) in length.
