= Oscar Dystel =

Oscar Dystel (October 31, 1912 – May 28, 2014) was an American publisher and paperback books pioneer whose firm Bantam Books published bestselling paperback editions of Catcher in the Rye, Jaws and Ragtime among many others. His management made Bantam the main publisher of mass-market paperbacks.

== Early years ==
Dystel was born in the Bronx, New York on October 31, 1912. His parents met in a garment factory, later running a tailors and, his father, a liquor store in Connecticut. As a child, he wanted to play the violin. Dystel was admitted to New York University on a track scholarship, working as a typesetter for The Times. He graduated in 1935 with a degree in advertising. His grades earned him a scholarship to Harvard Business School, from which he graduated in 1937.

== Career ==
After college Dystel worked on promotions at Esquire and then as editor on Coronet magazine. During his time at Coronet, he helped increase circulation from 87,000 to 2 million. He left the magazine in 1942 to serve in United States Office of War Information where he worked on psychological warfare. For his service, he won a Medal of Freedom for creating anti-Nazi pamphlets distributed in occupied France that were "valuable factors in reducing the enemy’s will to resist."

After the war he was hired by Collier's magazine as managing editor, but did not stay with the publication for very long. During this period he also worked as an executive for Gardner Cowles on their Quick news weekly, and became editor of Flair magazine in 1950.

=== Bantam ===
Bantam was founded in 1945, aiming to use new technology to produce cheap paperbacks. The company was a success initially, but by the 1950s the market was flooded and warehouses were filling with inventory. Bantam had not had a president for two years and was failing financially, looking at a years loss of over US$500,000, when Dystel was engaged in 1954 to manage the line. Although he was informed the company was essentially bankrupt, he demanded a cut of future profits, confident he would turn the company around.

One of Dystel's first decisions was to buy the paperback rights of Leon Uris' novel Battle Cry, beating rival Pocket Books by promising to have marines promote the book to wholesalers. He pursued a strategy of publishing cheap, portable versions of classic books in paperback form, targeting the school market. Early example included Dostoyevsky and John Steinbeck's East of Eden. He reduced inventory, increased the sales staff, and built a new corporate structure. By the end of the next year, the company was profitable.

In 1963 the paperback rights to J. D. Salinger's Catcher in the Rye were becoming available. Dystel learned that the thing Salinger desired was to design the new cover, a request Dystel gladly accepted. "We’ll publish it in a brown paper wrapping paper if [Salinger] wants that, just as long as the title is legible", he remarked. The Bantam edition sold a half million copies a year, reaching 46 printings by 1978.

Under Dystel, Bantam became known for its rapid book production, known as Bantam Extras. When the Warren Commission Report on John F. Kennedy's assassination came out in 1964, Bantam got the complete text into production in 80 hours. The work sold 1.6 million copies for Bantam. Later books in the series Pope Paul VI's 1965 trip to the United States and the 1969 Moon landing. In total the series spawned 56 titles.

Dystel most enjoyed finding new books with the potential to sell millions of copies. He liked stories that were riveting and could be turned into movies. He believed that covers were paramount. His covers started trends multiple times: first red, then white, then raised letters. In 1967 Dystel predicted Valley of the Dolls by Jacqueline Susann would sell a million copies. He was wrong – the initial press run of 4 million copies sold out in less than a year and a second run of 4 million was ordered. Dystel bought the rights to The Exorcist by William Peter Blatty in 1971 when no one else would. It went on to sell 10 million copies for the company. Jaws by Peter Benchley (1974), already a fast seller, set industry sales records by hitting 6 million copies sold in less than two years when Steven Spielberg's 1975 movie version came out. The book cover, designed by Dystel and his team, was duplicated for the movie poster.

Bertelsmann bought Bantam in 1977 and Dystel retired as chairman in 1980. By that time Bantam was the largest publisher of paperbacks, had over 15% of the market, and exceeded US$100 million in yearly sales. The company published 400–1000 titles a year during Dystel's reign.

== Personal life ==
Dystel married Marion Deitler on October 2, 1938. She died in 2003. They had two children together. Their son John, who had multiple sclerosis (MS), also died in 2003. He was a lawyer and a competitive figure skater in his youth. Their daughter Jane followed her father into the publishing business as an editor, publisher, and then a literary agent. She founded and is president of Dystel & Goderich Literary Management. Oscar Dystel died in Rye, New York on May 28, 2014 at the age of 101. He had been in poor health, and died at home according to his daughter Jane.
