= The Island (1980 film) =

1980 American thriller horror film directed by Michael Ritchie

- Theatrical poster
- Directed by: Michael Ritchie
- Screenplay by: Peter Benchley
- Based on: The Island by Peter Benchley
- Produced by: David Brown; Richard D. Zanuck
- Starring: Michael Caine; David Warner; Angela Punch McGregor
- Cinematography: Henri Decaë
- Edited by: Richard A. Harris
- Music by: Ennio Morricone
- Production companies: Universal Pictures; Zanuck/Brown Company
- Distributed by: Universal Pictures
- Release date: June 13, 1980
- Running time: 114 minutes
- Country: United States
- Language: English
- Budget: $22 million
- Box office: $15.7 million (US)

The Island is a 1980 American action adventure-horror film directed by Michael Ritchie and starring Michael Caine and David Warner. The film was based on a 1979 novel of the same name by Peter Benchley who also wrote the screenplay. It is about a savage group of pirates, made up of outcasts, thieves, and murderers, who are hidden from the outside world by an uncharted Caribbean island, and who have raided boats to sustain themselves since the 17th century.

== Plot ==
Jolly Roger from The Island

Blair Maynard is a British-born American journalist in New York City who was once in the Navy and who decides to investigate the mystery of why so many boats disappear in the Bermuda Triangle of the Caribbean. He takes his estranged son Justin with him to Florida with the promise of a vacation to Disney World and, while fishing, both are attacked by an unkempt man and forcibly brought to an uncharted island. On the island, Blair discovers that the inhabitants are a centuries-old colony of savage French pirates.

The group has been living on the island for centuries, unseen by society (except for an English archeologist obsessively keeping their secret) and sustain themselves by raiding pleasure boats. The pirates kill whoever comes to the island; however, Blair and Justin are both kept alive due to a false assumption that they are descended from Robert Maynard and a need to offset the negative effects of inbreeding. Blair is used to impregnate a woman named Beth, the widow of the man he killed, and act as a scribe for the largely illiterate group, while Justin is brainwashed to become a surrogate heir to Nau, the pirate leader. Blair struggles to escape from the island, but all attempts fail.

Blair begins his captivity as a very peaceable and civilized everyman, but he is helpless in the absence of law and the presence of the almost unlimited violence the pirates commit. Subjecting him to constant fear and abuse, the pirates fail to realize how desperate Blair is becoming as his repeated escape attempts fail. He eventually arranges for the pirates to come head to head with a US Coast Guard cutter, but they manage to wipe out the crew and take over the vessel. Blair sneaks aboard and, while most of the pirates are gathered on the aft deck of the ship, discovers a deck-mounted M2 machine gun hidden underneath a tarp, and opens fire on the pirates, killing nearly all of them.

Blair then learns that Nau was not on the deck. The two men then stalk each other through various parts of the decimated vessel. Blair eventually gets the upper hand and kills Nau with a flare gun. Blair and Justin, who no longer desires to be a pirate and seems much more respectful of his father, are reunited.

== Cast ==
- Michael Caine as Blair Maynard
- David Warner as Nau
- Angela Punch McGregor as Beth
- Frank Middlemass as Windsor
- Don Henderson as Rollo
- Dudley Sutton as Dr. Brazil
- Colin Jeavons as Hizzoner
- Jeffrey Frank as Justin Maynard
- Zakes Mokae as Wescott
- Brad Sullivan as Stark
- Reg Evans as Jack "The Bat"

== Production ==
Richard Zanuck and David Brown paid Peter Benchley $2.15 million for film rights to the novel The Island and a first draft screenplay, as well as a guarantee of 10 percent of the gross, five percent of the soundtrack sales, and approval of the crew and locations, which at the time was the largest amount ever paid for film rights to any book. Benchley later claimed that he could have been able to retire if the film was more successful. Brown said the budget was $12 million plus 25% overhead but other reports put it over $20 million. Principal photography took place between May 14 and August 23, 1979. The film was mostly shot on the islands of Antigua and Abaco, and the United States Coast Guard cutter Dauntless stands in for the fictitious USCGC New Hope in the movie. Some scenes were also shot in the British West Indies and Florida at Miami and Fort Lauderdale.

Australian Angela Punch McGregor was cast after Michael Ritchie saw her in Newsfront.

== Release ==
=== Home media ===
On July 27, 2011, Universal Studios Home Entertainment released the film on DVD as part of its Universal Vault Series as an Amazon exclusive. On December 11, 2012, Shout! Factory released a retail Blu-ray Disc/DVD combo pack of the film.

== Reception ==
=== Box office ===
The film performed poorly at the box office, earning $15 million on the budget of $22 million.

=== Critical reception ===
On Rotten Tomatoes, the film holds an approval rating of 50% based on eight reviews, with an average rating of 5.4/10. Author and film critic Leonard Maltin awarded the film a BOMB, his lowest rating, calling it "[an] Absolutely awful thriller", and criticized David Warner's casting as "the most normal guy on the island". Donald Guarisco from AllMovie gave the film a more positive review, calling Benchley's script "dark and witty, with gruesome violence, black humor". Guarisco summarized in his review by writing, "The Island is not for everybody but fans of big-budget oddities are likely to be fascinated by the well-funded eccentricity at play here."

== Accolades ==
- 1st Golden Raspberry Awards
  - Nominated: Worst Actor (Michael Caine)
  - Nominated: Worst Director (Michael Ritchie)
