= Seaweed Rebellion =

US environmentalist activist movement

The Seaweed Rebellion is an informal marine environmentalist activist movement in the United States. Deriving its name from an analogy with grassroots democracy, the movement comprises disparate organizations with the common aim of protecting the oceans, seas and coasts of the United States.

The Blue Frontier Campaign is an umbrella organization aiming to coordinate these groups into a common voice to achieve effective lobbying of federal and state policy makers.

The name was first applied to a 1947 court case between the United States and California over who owned the sea bed, and the associated oil deposits, off the state coast but is now heard rarely in that context.
