= FV Pelican =

Coordinates: 41.0708°N 71.8421°W

History
- Name: Pelican
- Completed: 1940
- Fate: Sank September 1, 1951

General characteristics
- Type: Party boat
- Tonnage: 14 GRT
- Length: 42 ft (13 m)

FV Pelican was a party boat, or head boat, operating out of Montauk, New York, which capsized on September 1, 1951, killing 45 passengers and crew, including the captain Eddie Carroll.

== Background ==
Pelican was originally constructed as the 42-foot (13 m) passenger fishing vessel Bellboy III in 1940 in Brooklyn, New York. The vessel was constructed with an enclosed cabin. At 14 gross register tons, she was not subject to United States Coast Guard regulations and annual inspection, which were required only of vessels more than 15 gross register tons. She was powered by twin 100-horsepower (75 kW) Chrysler engines.

At the time of the accident, Pelican was owned by Eddie Carroll, who held a U.S. Coast Guard captain's license. She operated as a party boat from the Fishangrila Dock at Fort Pond Bay in Montauk, New York, taking customers fishing for the day in the waters around Montauk. The Fishangrila Dock was within walking distance of the Montauk station of the Long Island Railroad. On weekends, the railroad ran "Fisherman's Special" trains from New York City to Montauk; passengers would exit the train and climb aboard one of the waiting party boats and pay their fare for a day of fishing.

== September 1, 1951 ==
On September 1, 1951, as the Fisherman's Special emptied its passengers, 62 fares climbed aboard Pelican, as did her captain, Eddie Carroll, and mate. Pelican left Fishangrila Dock at 7:30 AM, carrying 64 passengers and crew, which was grossly in excess of her safe carrying capacity. Weather forecasts posted at Fishangrila Dock called for a line of approaching storms and changing winds. After rounding Montauk Point and fishing on the south side of Montauk in the Atlantic Ocean for several hours, Pelican began to return to Fishangrila Dock, due to rough seas, at approximately 11:30 AM.

Encountering engine trouble on the way, which lengthened the trip, Pelican began to have difficulty making way against the conditions, with only one working engine. The weather changed suddenly as the squall line approached, with a strong northeast wind developing against an outgoing tide. The wind has been estimated at 25 to 35 mph (40 to 56 km/h) and the waves as high as 15 feet (4.6 m) in the rip tides near Montauk Point. While rounding Montauk Point at approximately 2:00 PM, Pelican was hit by two successive waves on the starboard quarter and capsized to port, spilling most of her passengers and crew into the water while trapping others inside the cabin. The vessel then foundered. The accident occurred within sight of Montauk Lighthouse, approximately one nautical mile (1.9 km; 1.2 mi) north off the point in the area known as Endeavor Shoals.

Two private fishing boats, Betty Ann and Bingo II, were the first to respond and rescue passengers. The U.S. Coast Guard picket boat that responded approximately one hour later was only able to rescue one passenger found clinging to Pelican's hull. In all, 45 passengers and crew, including Captain Carroll were killed.

== Aftermath ==
The hull, foundering beneath the waves, was first secured near Montauk Point by legendary Montauk fisherman Captain Frank Mundus on his vessel Cricket II and Carl Forsberg, founder of the Viking Fleet, the largest fishing fleet in Montauk, on his Viking V, and was later transferred to the Coast Guard picket boat, which towed it into Lake Montauk. As a result, several additional bodies were recovered which otherwise might have been lost if Pelican had been allowed to sink.

Following the disaster, a U.S. Coast Guard investigation was conducted. The investigating board estimated that Pelican could not have safely carried more than 30 passengers and that her overloaded condition contributed to the capsize and loss of life by causing her to ride low in the water and exaggerating the rolling motion caused by the waves. The failure of Carroll to keep himself aware of the weather conditions and to properly distribute his passengers on the vessel were also cited as reasons for the capsize. The investigation concluded that more stringent safety regulations were necessary for such boats. The "T-boat" regulations, 46 CFR, subchapter T, which included routine inspections of all vessels for hire carrying seven or more people and strict regulation of passenger capacity went into effect in 1957.

== In popular culture ==
The Long Island band Brand New wrote the song "Play Crack The Sky" about Pelican's demise and included it on the 2003 album Deja Entendu.
