= The Island (Benchley novel) =

1979 novel by Peter Benchley

- First edition
- Author: Peter Benchley
- Cover artist: Alex Gotfryd/Fred Marcellino
- Language: English
- Publisher: Doubleday
- Publication date: 1979
- Publication place: United States
- Media type: Print
- Pages: 302
- ISBN: 0-385-13172-0

The Island is a novel by Peter Benchley, published in 1979 by Doubleday & Co. It is about a journalist and his son who are captured by a band of modern-day pirates in the Caribbean, who brainwash the boy and groom him to become leader of the pirate band. In 1980, it was made into a film adaptation under the same title, directed by Michael Ritchie.

== Plot summary ==
Blair Maynard, a divorced journalist in New York City, decides to write a story about the unexplained disappearance of yachts and other small boats in the Caribbean, hoping to debunk theories about the Bermuda Triangle.

He has week-end custody of his preadolescent son Justin, and decides to mix a vacation with work, taking his son along. They fly from Miami to the Turks and Caicos island chain but, while on a fishing trip, are captured by a band of pirates. The pirates have remained undetected since the establishment of their pirate enclave by Jean-David Nau, the notorious buccaneer L'Olonnais, in 1671. They have become a lost colony.

The pirates have a constitution of sorts, called the Covenant, and have a cruel but workable society. They raise any children they capture to ensure the survival of the colony, but kill anyone over the age of thirteen years. In short order, Justin is brain-washed and groomed to lead the pirate band, much to Maynard's horror. Maynard tries repeatedly to escape, and finally attracts the attention of the passing United States Coast Guard cutter New Hope. The pirates attack and capture it, but Maynard is able to use a machine gun aboard to kill most of the pirates and to win Justin's and his own freedom.

== Film adaptation ==
The Island, a film directed by Michael Ritchie, was based upon the book; Benchley wrote the screenplay. It starred Michael Caine and David Warner, opened to negative reviews and was considered a box office flop.
