= Peter Benchley =

American author (1940–2006)

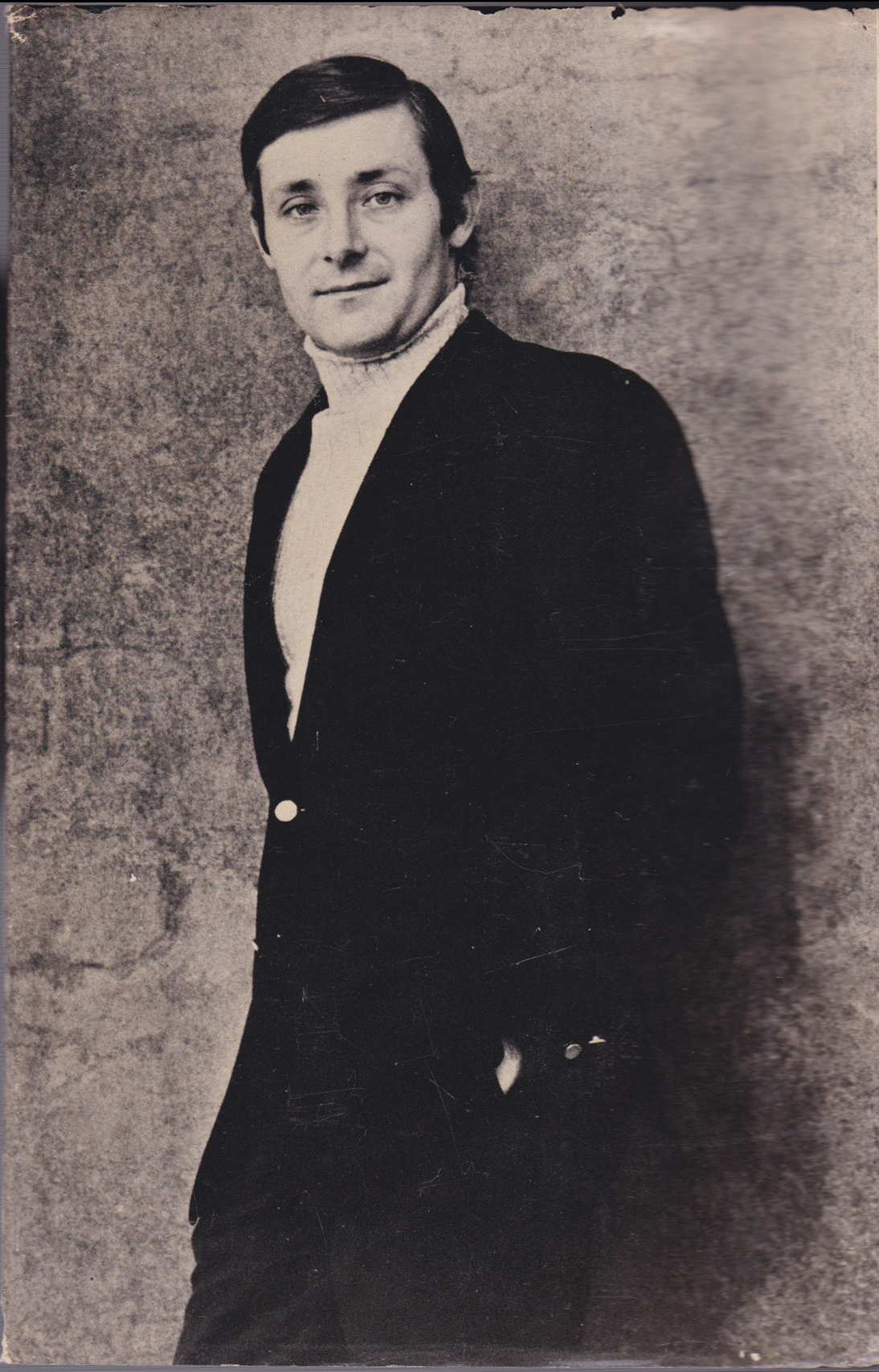
- Portrait by Alex Gotfryd, 1974
- Born: Peter Bradford Benchley; May 8, 1940; New York City, U.S.
- Died: February 11, 2006 (aged 65); Princeton, New Jersey, U.S.
- Education: Harvard University (AB)
- Occupations: Author; screenwriter; ocean activist
- Years active: 1967–2006
- Spouse: Winifred "Wendy" Wesson (m. 1964)
- Children: 3
- Parent(s): Marjorie Bradford; Nathaniel Benchley
- Relatives: Robert Benchley (grandfather); Nat Benchley (brother)
- Website: peterbenchley.com

Signature
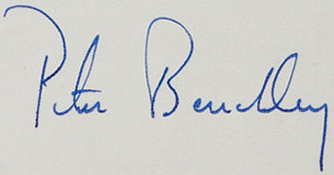

Peter Bradford Benchley (May 8, 1940 – February 11, 2006) was an American author. He is best known for his bestselling novel Jaws and co-wrote its movie adaptation with Carl Gottlieb. Several more of his works were also adapted for both cinema and television, including The Deep, The Island, Beast, and White Shark.

Later in life, Benchley expressed regret for his writing about sharks, which he felt indulged already present fear and false belief about sharks, and he became an advocate for marine conservation.

== Early life, family and education ==
Benchley was the son of author Nathaniel Benchley and Marjorie (née Bradford), and grandson of Algonquin Round Table founder Robert Benchley. His younger brother, Nat Benchley, is a writer and actor. Peter Benchley was an alumnus of the Allen-Stevenson School, Phillips Exeter Academy and Harvard University.

After graduating from college in 1961, Benchley travelled around the world for a year. The experience was told in his first book, Time and a Ticket, a travel memoir published by Houghton Mifflin in 1964.

== Early career ==
After return to the US from travel, Benchley had six months reserve duty in the Marine Corps, then became a reporter for The Washington Post. By then Benchley was in New York, working as television editor for Newsweek. In 1967 he became a speechwriter in the White House for President Lyndon B. Johnson until Johnson's term ended in 1969.

== Jaws ==
By 1971, Benchley was doing various freelance jobs to support himself and his family. During this period, when Benchley would later declare he was "making one final attempt to stay alive as a writer", his literary agent arranged meetings with publishers. At these meetings, Benchley would frequently pitch two ideas: a non-fiction book about pirates, and a novel depicting a man-eating shark terrorizing a community. This idea had been developed by Benchley since he had read a news report of a fisherman catching a 4,550-pound (2,060 kg) great white shark off the coast of Long Island in 1964. The shark novel eventually attracted Doubleday editor Thomas Congdon, who offered Benchley an advance of $1,000 resulting in the novelist submitting the first 100 pages. Much of the work was rewritten as the publisher was not happy with the initial style. Benchley worked by winter in his Pennington office, and during summer in a converted chicken coop at the farm of his in-laws in Stonington. The idea was inspired by the several great white sharks caught in the 1960s off Long Island and Block Island by the Montauk charterboat captain Frank Mundus.

Jaws was published in 1974 and became a great success, a bestseller for 44 weeks. Steven Spielberg, who would direct the movie version of Jaws, has said that he initially found most of the characters unsympathetic and wanted the shark to win. Several book critics shared the sentiment and found the characters banal and the writing amateurish, but the book was popular nonetheless.

Although Benchley had written the early drafts of the screenplay, Carl Gottlieb (along with the uncredited Howard Sackler and John Milius) wrote the majority of the final script for the Spielberg movie released in June 1975. Benchley made a cameo appearance in the film as a news reporter on the beach. The movie, featuring Roy Scheider, Robert Shaw, and Richard Dreyfuss, was released during the summer season, considered traditionally to be a bad season for movies. However, Universal Pictures decided to release the movie with extensive television advertising and it eventually grossed more than $470 million worldwide. George Lucas used a similar strategy in 1977 for Star Wars which exceeded the financial record set by Jaws, and hence the summer "blockbuster" movie practice was born.

Benchley estimated that his income from book sales, movie rights and magazine/book club syndication, enabled him to work independently as a movie writer for ten years.

== Subsequent career ==
Benchley developed his second novel, The Deep, published in 1976, after a chance meeting in Bermuda with diver Teddy Tucker while writing a story for National Geographic. Benchley visited the wreck of the Constellation which he described as having sunk on top of two other wrecks, the Montana and the Lartington. This gave Benchley the idea of a honeymooning couple discovering two sunken treasures on the Bermuda reefs—17th century Spanish gold and a fortune in World War II-era morphine—and who are victimized subsequently by a drug syndicate. Benchley co-wrote the screenplay for the 1977 movie release, along with Tracy Keenan Wynn and an uncredited Tom Mankiewicz. Directed by Peter Yates and featuring Robert Shaw, Nick Nolte and Jacqueline Bisset, The Deep was a financial success, and one of the top 10 highest-grossing movies in the US in 1977, though its financial tally was much less than that of Jaws. However, the movie inspired a number of technical firsts and was a Best Sound nominee at the 1978 Oscars.

The Island, published in 1979, was a story of descendants of 17th-century pirates who terrorize pleasure craft in the Caribbean, resulting in the Bermuda Triangle mystery. Benchley again wrote the screenplay for the movie adaptation. But the movie version of The Island, featuring Michael Caine and co-featuring David Warner, failed financially when released in 1980.

During the 1980s, Benchley wrote three novels that did not sell as well as his previous works. However, among them was Girl of the Sea of Cortez, a fable influenced by John Steinbeck's The Log from the Sea of Cortez. Benchley's novel, about a girl's complicated relationship with the sea, was his best-reviewed book and has developed a considerable cult following since its publication. Sea of Cortez indicated Benchley's increasing interest with ecological issues and anticipated his future role as an advocate of the importance of protecting the marine environment. Q Clearance, published in 1986, was written from his experience as a staffer in Johnson's White House. Rummies (also known as Lush), which was published in 1989, is a semi-autobiographical work, inspired partly by the Benchley family's history of alcohol abuse. While the first half of the novel is a relatively straightforward account of a suburbanite's development of alcoholism, the second part, which is set at a New Mexico substance abuse clinic, is written as a thriller.

He resumed nautical themes for 1991's Beast written about a giant squid threatening Bermuda. Beast was brought to the small screen as a made-for-television movie in 1996, with the title The Beast. His next novel, White Shark, was published in 1994. The story of a Nazi-created genetically engineered shark/human hybrid, it failed to achieve popular or critical success. It was also adapted as a made-for-television movie, Creature. Christopher Lehmann-Haupt of The New York Times determined it "looks more like Arnold Schwarzenegger than any fish". Also in 1994, Benchley became the first person to host Discovery Channel's Shark Week.

In 1999, the television show Peter Benchley's Amazon was created, about a group of airplane crash survivors in the middle of a vast jungle.

During the last decade of his career, Benchley wrote non-fiction works about the sea and about sharks, advocating their conservation. Among these was his book Shark Trouble, which illustrated how hype and news sensationalism can interfere with the public's understanding of marine ecosystems and potentially cause negative consequences as humans interact with it. This work, which had editions in 2001 and 2003, was written to help a post-Jaws public to more fully understand "the sea in all its beauty, mystery and power". It details the ways in which man seems to have become more of an aggressor in his relationship with sharks, acting from ignorance and greed as several of the species become threatened increasingly by overfishing.

Benchley was a member of the National Council of Environmental Defense and a spokesman for its Oceans Program: "[T]he shark in an updated Jaws could not be the villain; it would have to be written as the victim; for, worldwide, sharks are much more the oppressed than the oppressors."

He was also one of the founding board members of the Bermuda Underwater Exploration Institute (BUEI).

== Legacy ==
Due to Peter Benchley's long record of shark conservation and educating the public about sharks, the Peter Benchley Ocean Awards have been instituted by Wendy Benchley and David Helvarg as his legacy.

In 2015, researchers confirmed a new species of lanternshark had been found off the Pacific coast of South America, naming it Etmopterus benchleyi. Main researcher Vicki Vásquez noted the author's work in promoting ocean conservation, particularly sharks, as motivation.

== Personal life and death ==
Benchley resided in New York City during his time working for Newsweek. In 1963, Benchley was dining at an inn in Nantucket when he met Winifred "Wendy" Wesson, whom he dated and then married the next year, 1964. They resided in the Washington, DC, area while he worked for the White House. In 1967, his daughter Tracy was born. The Benchleys relocated out of Washington and lived in various houses, including one in Stonington, Connecticut, where son Clayton was born in 1969. Benchley wanted to be near New York, and the family eventually got a house at Pennington, New Jersey, in 1970. Since his home had no space for an office, Benchley rented a room above a furnace supply company.

In 2006, Benchley died of pulmonary fibrosis at his home in Princeton, New Jersey, at the age of 65.

== Works ==
=== Fiction ===
- Jaws (1974)
- The Deep (1976)
- The Island (1979)
- The Girl of the Sea of Cortez (1982)
- Q Clearance (1986)
- Rummies (1989)
- Beast (1991)
- White Shark (1994, republished as Creature in 1997)

=== Non-fiction ===
- Time and a Ticket (1964)
- Life's Tempo on Nantucket (1970)
- Ocean Planet: Writings and Images of the Sea (1994)
- Shark Trouble: True Stories About Sharks and the Sea (2001)
- Shark!: True Stories and Lessons from the Deep (2002)
- Shark Life: True Stories About Sharks and the Sea (with Karen Wojtyla) (2005)

=== Film ===
- Jaws, 1975 film adaptation, actor: Interviewer.
- The Deep, 1977 film adaptation, actor: Mate (uncredited)
- Jaws 2, based on characters from Jaws
- The Island, 1980 film adaptation
- Jaws 3-D (a.k.a. Jaws 3), based on characters from Jaws
- Jaws: The Revenge, a fourth film based on characters from Jaws
- Dolphin Cove, 1989 TV series
- The Beast, 1996 television film adaptation
- Creature, 1998 television film adaptation
- Amazon, 1999 TV series
- Mrs. Parker and the Vicious Circle, 1994, actor: Frank Crowninshield

== See also ==
- Jersey Shore shark attacks of 1916
- Publishers Weekly lists of bestselling novels in the United States
