= Chris Fallows =

South African zoologist

- Born: South Africa
- Occupations: Photographer, conservationist and adventurer
- Spouse: Monique Fallows
- Website: www.chrisfallows.com

Chris Fallows is a South African expert on great white sharks and their hunting habits. He has amassed the largest database of predatory events involving great white sharks in False Bay and was the first member of the scientific community to observe the breaching behaviour.

== Early life ==
Growing up in a game reserve, Fallow's fascination with wildlife stretches back to his childhood. After moving to the coast at the age of 12 his fascination with the ocean and marine wildlife grew. At the age of 16 Fallows co-ordinated a tag and release program in his home town. His endeavours, with the co-operation of local beach net fishermen, saw the tagging, documenting and releasing of over fifteen thousand sharks and rays. Fallows attended Rondebosch Boys' High School in Cape Town.

== Career ==
In 1992 Fallows was at the forefront of great white shark tours when he started his work and research at Dyer Island off Gansbaai. He worked there until 1996 when he co-founded African Shark Eco-Charters in False Bay. It was then that he along with colleague discovered the breaching great white sharks that have been made famous by the Air Jaws movies. In 2000 Fallows formed Apex Shark Expeditions with his wife Monique. Over the last 15 years together they observed and catalogued over 9500 predatory events. This is the largest database of its kind in the world.

Chris Fallows has co authored 10 scientific papers on the breaching behaviour of great white sharks when hunting as well a book titled, Great White and the Majesty of Sharks which has sold over 25,000 copies. Fallows has worked with David Attenborough on the "Shallow Seas" episode of the Planet Earth series, National Geographic, Discovery Channel and helped produce the Air Jaws series of shark documentaries.

As well as great white shark observation and cage diving, Fallows has undertaken nearly 200 open water diving expeditions with the mako shark and blue sharks in South Africa since 1999.

Chris Fallows is also a wildlife photographer. Although he is best known for his world famous breaching great white shark images, he specialises in both ocean and terrestrial wildlife photography. His limited edition fine art prints are globally renowned for their intimate representation of some of the world's most charismatic and iconic mega fauna. His gallery can be viewed on www.chrisfallows.com His August 2020 image, "The Pearl", of a great white shark breaching the sea's surface, was selected by BBC as one of "the most striking images of 2020."
