= Air Jaws =

Series of television specials

Air Jaws is a series of sixteen TV specials about great white sharks that have aired on Discovery Channel's Shark Week. The specials are mainly filmed in the Indian Ocean off the coast of South Africa, many on Seal Island in False Bay, near Cape Town, or in Mossel Bay. In recent years, the series shifted to southern New Zealand.

Air Jaws hosts have included Rocky Strong, Chris Fallows, Jeff Kurr, Andy Casagrande, Dickie Chivell, Paul De Gelder and Dr. Alison Towner. All sixteen specials were produced and directed by Jeff Kurr, who has filmed more than 100 breaching great whites.

The third episode "Ultimate Air Jaws" was nominated for an Emmy, Outstanding Individual Achievement in a Craft: Cinematography - Nature in 2011. "Air Jaws: The Hunt for Colossus" kicked off Shark Week 2025, premiering Sunday, July 20th at 9pm.

== Episode list ==
1. Air Jaws: Sharks of South Africa (2001)
2. Air Jaws II: Even Higher (2002)
3. Ultimate Air Jaws (2010)
4. Air Jaws Apocalypse (2012)
5. Air Jaws: Fin of Fury (2014)
6. Air Jaws: Walking with Great Whites (2015)
7. Air Jaws: Night Stalker (2016)
8. Air Jaws: The Hunted (2018)
9. Air Jaws: Back from the Dead (2018)
10. Air Jaws Strikes Back (2019)
11. Air Jaws Ultimate Breach Off (2020)
12. Air Jaws 2020 (2020)
13. Air Jaws: Going for Gold (2021)
14. Air Jaws: Top Guns (2022)
15. Air Jaws: The Final Frontier (2023)
16. Air Jaws: The Hunt for Colossus (2025)

== Home media ==
DVD releases of Air Jaws episodes
Episode	DVD title(s)
Air Jaws: Sharks of South Africa	Shark Week: 20th Anniversary Collection; Shark Week: Jaws of Steel; Shark Week: 30 Years
Air Jaws II: Even Higher	Shark Week: 20th Anniversary Collection; Shark Week: Jaws of Steel
Ultimate Air Jaws	Shark Week: Restless Fury; Shark Week: 25th Anniversary Collection
Air Jaws Apocalypse	Shark Week: Predator of the Deep
Air Jaws: Fin of Fury	Shark Week: Jawsome Encounters
Air Jaws: Walking with Great Whites; Air Jaws: Night Stalker	Shark Week: Shark 'n' Awe! Collection
