= Rummies =

1989 novel by Peter Benchley

- Author: Peter Benchley
- Language: English
- Genre: Fiction
- Published: 1989
- Publisher: Random House
- Publication place: USA
- Pages: 340
- ISBN: 0449219453

Rummies is a 1989 novel by American author Peter Benchley. It features an ensemble cast of characters who meet and interact at a drug rehabilitation clinic. The main character, the "WASP-ish" Scott Preston, has a debilitating alcohol addiction, and sees his wife and boss stage an intervention, sending him to a clinic in New Mexico. It has been likened to Ken Kesey's One Flew Over the Cuckoo's Nest.
