= Blue Frontier Campaign =

US non-profit organization

The Blue Frontier Campaign is a United States marine conservation activist organization founded by David Helvarg in 2003.

The Campaign has established a nationwide network of grassroots (the marine conservation community or Blue Movement calls this 'seaweed') lobbyists. It is campaigning for an American Oceans Act to protect what the members call "our public seas" and is working to improve ocean policies in the 23 coastal states of the United States. Blue Frontier supports maritime community activists by distributing model policies and practices. Its other objectives include the creation of books, a TV documentary series, and other educational materials on ocean exploration and stewardship. The first such creation was the 2005 - 2006 Ocean and Coastal Conservation Guide. The Blue Vision Conference in Washington DC in July 2004 and Blue Vision Mid-Atlantic Conference at the National Aquarium in Baltimore in April 2005 were the start of a series of seminars to introduce seaweed activists to oceanographers, port officials, and other marine stakeholders. Annual awards called "The Breakers" are presented in ten categories: Art & Entertainment, Conservation Science, Marine Education, Best Business Practices, and Hero of the Seas.

Future plans for the Campaign include endowing a fellowship for investigative reporting on waste, fraud and abuse on America's Seas, working to include marine education in middle school and high school curricula, and developing a media campaign that highlights lessons from the past American frontier, and "applies these to our new blue one".

The directors of the Campaign represent other activist organizations including Clean Ocean Action, The Democracy Collaborative, EarthEcho International, Khaled Bin Sultan Living Oceans Foundation, National Alliance for Hispanic Health, Reef Relief, and Save Our Shores. It also has a panel of over twenty advisors.

In 2007 two new Blue Frontier projects include Roz Savage's solo crossing of the Pacific Ocean, and a school program for the 50 Ways to Save the Ocean book.

== See also ==
- Seaweed Rebellion

== Publications ==
- Helvarg, David, 50 Ways to Save the Ocean, (Inner Ocean Publishing, 2006) ISBN 978-1-930722-66-8
- Helvarg, David, Blue Frontier: Dispatches from America's Ocean Wilderness, (Sierra Club Books, 2006) ISBN 1-57805-157-6
- Helvarg, David (ed.), Ocean and Coastal Conservation Guide 2005-2006: The Blue Movement Directory, (Island Press, 2005) ISBN 1-55963-859-1
- Helvarg, David, Blue Frontier: Saving America's Living Seas, (W. H. Freeman, 2001) ISBN 978-0-7167-3715-5
