= David Helvarg =

American journalist and environmental activist (born 1951)

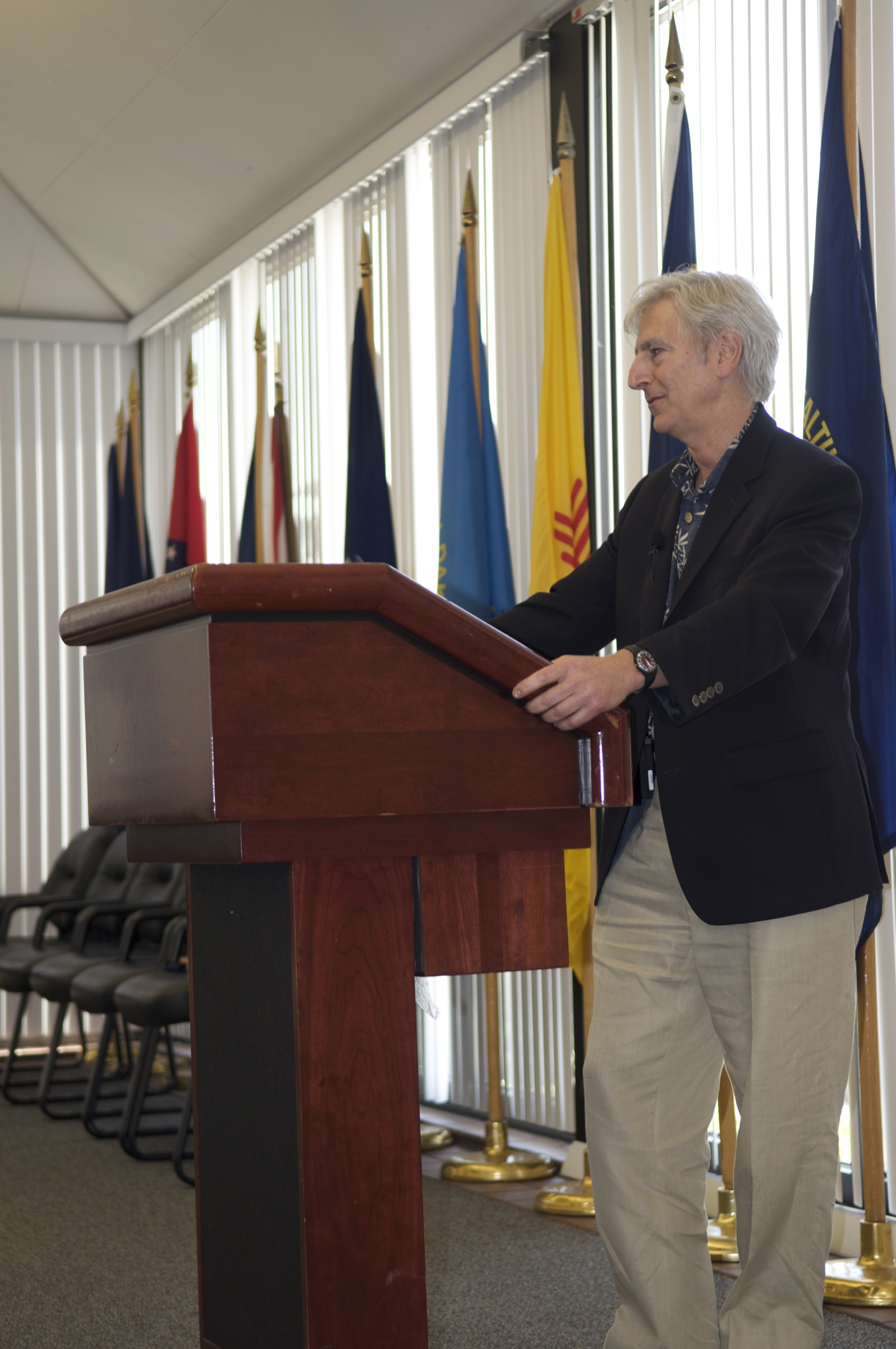
- Helvarg speaking at Coast Guard Island in 2010
- Born: April 10, 1951 (age 75); Long Island, New York
- Known for: Author, Journalist, Executive Director of Blue Frontier
- Notable work: Blue Frontier, 50 Ways to Save the Ocean, Saved by the Sea

David Helvarg (born April 10, 1951) is an American journalist and environmental activist. He is the founder and president of the marine conservation lobbying organization Blue Frontier Campaign.He is associated with the 'Seaweed rebellion' marine environmentalist movement. He is an author; his writing is often related to marine environmental activism, such as his second book, Blue Frontier. His first book, The War against the Greens, argues that violent organized resistance is being orchestrated against the environmental movement.

Helvarg began his career as a freelance journalist, became a war correspondent, then returned to news journalism. He writes about politics, AIDS, and sea life. He has reported from every continent and been widely published. His journalism and environmental work inform his advocacy.

== Early life ==
Helvarg was born April 10, 1951, in New York City, the son of refugees; his mother left Nazi Germany and his father escaped civil war in Ukraine. He attended Boston University and earned a bachelor's degree in history from Goddard College in Vermont, in 1974.

== Works ==
=== Journalism ===
While still a student, Helvarg traveled to Northern Ireland in 1973. The civil warfare known as "The Troubles" was at a height, and Helvarg submitted reports on the conflict to the Liberation News Service. Helvarg focused on the role of women in the conflict, and highlighted allegations that agents of the British government had participated in sectarian murders. After graduating from college, he moved to San Diego to work as a freelance journalist. He published "Ireland Diary; A Day in the Life" in the underground publication San Diego Door, and wrote for the weekly newspaper San Diego Newsline.

From 1979 to 1983, Helvarg covered the U.S. role in Central American conflicts, initially as a radio reporter for The Associated Press and Pacifica Radio in Nicaragua and El Salvador. His reporting included the conflict in El Salvador, the arrival of U.S. military equipment, and an interview with Sister Ita Ford. He was arrested by the Salvadoran army and deported from El Salvador in 1983 while reporting on a massacre of civilians.

After returning to California, he qualified as a private investigator, and resumed freelance writing. He wrote reports on underwater technology, articles about John Hoagland after conducting the photographer's last interview, and an interview with Jonas Salk. He later transitioned into television production. Throughout the late 1980s, his television topics were dominated by AIDS education, particularly for the Hispanic community.

In the early 1990s, he began to research the conflict between the US free-market environmentalist group Wise Use and the green movement, which was eventually published as The War against the Greens in 1994. The Wise Use movement alleged that the US environmentalist group Sierra Club commissioned Helvarg to write the book as an anti-Wise Use tirade and that his sponsors also sponsored a road show to tie Wise Use to an alleged far-right terrorist network. The same article described him as "a private investigator" without mentioning his role as a journalist.

A visit to Antarctica in 1999 became material for several articles and books, and a daily log was published in Slate, the online news magazine. His professional exposure to green activism and his ocean sports activities intersected in marine conservation, which became his focus. While researching his second book Blue Frontier—Saving America's Living Seas (2001), Helvarg concluded that marine conservation needed its own focal point for activism in the United States, so he moved to Washington, D.C., and founded a lobbying organization: the Blue Frontier Campaign. He also became a member of the board of Reef Relief, a more specific marine conservation advocacy group, about which he had made a television documentary in 1994.

Helvarg attracted attention in early 2005 for a newspaper article in which he addressed comments made by conservative Christians (particularly James Dobson of the Focus on the Family) regarding perceived homosexual tendencies of SpongeBob SquarePants due to an explanation of the sexual biology of ocean life (Los Angeles Times January 26, 2005). In response to suggestions by Dobson and others that the We Are Family Foundation was exploiting popular animated characters, including SpongeBob, to promote the acceptance of homosexuality among young people, Helvarg described the "immorality" in the oceans.

=== Books ===
==== The Golden Shore - California's Love Affair with the Sea ====
The Golden Shore "The Golden Shore" (in imprint of St. Martin's) 2013. "Boy, I loved this book. David Helvarg captures, in a really readable way, the quirky and head-over-heels love we have for our seas." - Ted Danson.

"Having lived in California for forty-four years, I was surprised by how much I learned from David Helvarg's book The Golden Shore. It blew my mind. If you have the same love affair for the beautiful California coast and ocean as I do, this marvelous and compelling book is a must-read." - Jean-Michel Cousteau.

==== Saved by the Sea -- A Love Story with Fish ====
"Saved by the Sea"(an imprint of St. Martin's) 2010. Ocean Explorer Sylvia Earle says, "This book has the power to change the way you think about the world, about yourself, and the future of humankind." Helvarg writes what he knows about the changes in his life and our Ocean world over the last half century.

==== "Rescue Warriors - The U.S. Coast Guard, America's Forgotten Heroes" (St. Martin's 2009) ====
Robert Kennedy Jr. says, "David Helvarg's terrific new book takes you to the cutting edge of adventure as he rides along with the men and women of the U.S. Coast Guard. This in-depth and lively look at the history and changing missions of America's 'Rescue Warriors' should be considered a must-read for anyone who loves the water or cares about the safety, security, and stewardship of our nation from sea to shining sea." Bill McKibben writes, "They say that 'I'm from the government and I'm here to help' is the ultimate oxymoron. But as this vivid book makes powerfully clear, in the case of the Coast Guard it's the simple truth. Stow this volume next to the chart case."

==== "50 Ways To Save the Ocean" (Inner Ocean, 2006) ====
Sylvia Earle writes, "Combining wisdom and humor, scientific accuracy and artistic genius, Helvarg and Toomey show why the ocean matters to us all...Everyone, from toddler to tycoon, can find inspiration for action in this must-have guide to ocean care." "This is a great book - it makes saving the oceans fun and doable (which it is, by the way)" adds actor Ted Danson "This book is an important guide for the public to saving our oceans." - Leon Panetta, former chair - Pew Oceans commission & co-chair of the Joint Ocean Commission Initiative, former Director of the CIA, current United States Secretary of Defense.

==== The War against the Greens ====
The War against the Greens (1994) examines opposition to the U.S. environmental movement, including the Wise Use movement. Wise Use aims to facilitate extensive use of natural resources and to privatize the National Park Service. The first edition explored the origins of the organization in 1988 and its covert support by the administration of U.S. President George H. W. Bush. Helvarg identified its funding and the multinational corporations and other powerful figures with which it was associated. He catalogued the use of violence that he believed to be organized by the movement against environmental activists, and the ineffective response of law-enforcement agencies. A revised edition published in 2004 extended this to cover the early years of President George W. Bush's administration.

Wisconsin Stewardship Network News described it as a book that "provides a fascinating and frightening insight into the violent fringe of the anti-conservation Wise Use movement [… and recommends it] in its entirety to readers who want a detailed examination of the origins, development and violent tendencies of Wise Use." The opposing view was put by Jesse Walker who, reviewing the book for American Enterprise, wrote that it "offers environmentalists a conspiracy theory to account for the populist backlash against their movement". Helvarg had accused Wise Use of astroturfing; Walker described his book as "a weapon in a propaganda war".

War against the Greens is widely cited by activists inside the environmental movement (for example Community Rights Counsel and Land Tenure Center ) and gave rise to numerous rebuttals from Wise Use and its supporters (including Ron Arnold).

==== Blue Frontier—Dispatches from America's Ocean Wilderness ====
Helvarg's second book, Blue Frontier— Dispatches from America's Ocean Wilderness (2001, revised 2006), was named on the Los Angeles Times "Best Books of 2001" republished in 2006. In it Helvarg explores the effects of human activity in general, and of commerce and policy in particular, on marine life. He postulates a trend towards destruction, and suggests that it is possible to reverse this. He then describes some of the people and groups that are working to preserve or enhance the marine environment.

This book prompted Senator John Kerry to observe that "David Helvarg underscores the full measure of the challenges before us: If we hope to explore the Blue Frontier, we must travel cautiously, repairing the damage we have done, understanding before we exploit, and always preserving the natural systems that have created it." It was also one of the catalysts for the establishment of the Blue Frontier Campaign and has become a definitive text for US marine conservation (characterized as 'the Seaweed rebellion').

==== The Ocean and Coastal Conservation Guide ====
Helvarg is the editor of Blue Frontier Campaign's first major publication: The Ocean and Coastal Conservation Guide (2005), a directory for those interested in the protection and restoration of United States coastal lands and waters. Blue Frontier Campaign plans to publish a new edition of the guide every two years.

This reference book lists over 2,000 organizations involved in the conservation of the oceans and coastal areas that border the United States. Each entry includes contact information and a brief description of that organization's activities. The directory is divided into four listings: a geographical listings of groups; relevant government agencies; academic marine programs; and marine and coastal parks, and protected areas.

==== Feeling the Heat ====
Helvarg contributed two chapters to Feeling the Heat—Reports from the Frontlines of Climate Change (2004): Chapter Eight 'Australia, Florida and Fiji: Reefs At Risk' and Chapter 10 'Antarctica: The Ice is Moving' are about threatened ecosystems.

The book is a development of a suite of articles that appeared in the October/November 2000 edition of E/The Environmental Magazine. The publishers "aimed to move beyond the scientific debate […] to document […] the evidence for a changing climate". Each chapter is a first person account of places threatened by global warming. According to Helvarg, warming waters are killing the world's coral and threatening the extinction of Australia's Great Barrier Reef and the reefs around the Florida Keys, while the rising waters threaten to engulf the entire ocean nation of Fiji. In Antarctica he observed scientists measuring the krill population and concludes that the reduction that they found is a consequence of increased water temperatures.

=== Broadcasting ===
Helvarg has produced more than 40 television documentaries broadcast by PBS, The Discovery Channel, and others. His 1986 documentary Sex Inc. aired on KQED. Other documentaries focused on the military, politics, health and environmental topics. He is a commentator for the National Public Radio station Public Radio International's program Marketplace.

His first documentaries drew upon his experiences as a war correspondent in Northern Ireland and Central America. When he moved to San Francisco he was commissioned to produce programs about AIDS awareness for the Hispanic community and these led to other documentaries about Hispanic health. In 1989 Globe TV commissioned a program about Greenpeace to coincide with the launch of the new Rainbow Warrior vessel. This brought Helvarg into contact with green activists, with whose cause he found he sympathized. He would return to green themes in 1991 and 1992 but in the meantime he continued to make series about health, and topical news. From 1992 onwards his energies were focussed on environmental programming with some health commissions.

As of 2005 he continues to plan a series of documentaries about ocean stewardship to support the work of the Blue Frontier Campaign.

=== Blue Frontier Campaign ===
In 2003 Helvarg founded the marine conservation activist organization Blue Frontier Campaign, of which he became the president. Originally entitled the "Ocean Awareness Project", the Campaign has established a nationwide network of grassroots lobbyists. It is campaigning for an American Oceans Act to protect what the members call "our public seas" and is working to improve local, state, federal and global policies on marine conservation. Helvarg writes articles and books on its behalf. He edited the 2005–2006 Ocean and Coastal Conservation Guide and (with Philippe Cousteau and 'Sherman's Lagoon' cartoonist Jim Toomey, the book, '50 Ways to Save the Ocean' and has organized several conferences: in Washington, D.C., in July 2004 and March 2009 and at the National Aquarium in Baltimore in April 2005 and San Francisco in 2005. These conferences brought together activists, academics, officials, and politicians in a series of seminars. The Campaign is based in Washington, D.C., and the San Francisco Bay Area where Helvarg lives.

== Awards ==
Helvarg won his first national award in 1988 when he won an Emmy for community service in recognition of his work on AIDS Lifeline, a networked television AIDS awareness campaign. His subsequent awards include two National Association for Interpretation awards for Interpretive Communications (in 1989 and 1991), the Nike Earthwrite Award (1997), a National Health Information Award (1999) and a CINE Golden Eagle Award (1999). In 2005, Coastal Living magazine gave him their Leadership Award. In 2007 he won the Herman Melville Award.

== Television and video works ==
- 1982: Where The Bombs Are, Internment Memories, and Where Are They Now? (KFMB CBS, San Diego).
- 1983: Reports from Central America (Swedish TV Channel One), Soldiers & Rebels (PBS National), and Amphibious Assault (KFMB CBS, San Diego).
- 1985: Each One, Teach One (Coalition of Hispanic Health).
- 1986: In The Shadow of Marcos, Sex, Inc., and Navy Town. (KQED, San Francisco).
- 1987: John Hoagland — Frontline Photographer (PBS), Zap, and Troubled Waters (KQED, San Francisco).
- 1988: Critical Condition and Sexual Roulette (AIDS Lifeline — Group W Syndication), Coming of Age (Coalition of Hispanic Health & Human Services) and John Hoagland — Frontline Photographer (Discovery Channel)
- 1989: Warriors of the Rainbow, Alex de Grassi's Music of Bolivia, and Treasure of Tiwanaku (Globe TV, A&E Channel) and Net Profits (KQED, San Francisco, MacNeil-Lehrer News Hour).
- 1990: Passive Smoking, Couples And Money, Handicapped Kids Go High Tech, and Inoculations Make Sense (Special Reports, Whittle) and Al Giddings Gear and Crime Lab (The Next Step, Discovery Channel).
- 1991: Traffic 2010 and Beat the Back-Up (KPIX CBS San Francisco), Nuclear Nightmare and Driftnet Pirates (Geraldo Rivera's Now It Can Be Told), and Who Bombed Judi Bari? (KQED San Francisco PBS & KCET Los Angeles PBS).
- 1992: Las Medicinas y Usted (Council On Family Health), Green For Life (KRON NBC San Francisco) and BDF — The Baja Expedition (Pacific Coast Marine).
- 1994: Wildlife Crime Lab, Seattle Spokes, Reef Relief and Clean Air Cabs (PBS National).
- 1995: Heroes of the Earth — Choi Yul's Korea (Golden Gate Productions) and Para Vivir Bien (Coalition of Hispanic Health & Human Services).
- 1996: Predator Friendly Wool (PBS National) and La Tardeada (Coalition of Hispanic Health & Human Services).
- 1997: International Rivers Network and Rainforest Action Network (Video News Releases).
- 1998: Demuestra tu Carino: Vacuna a tu Bebe (Coalition of Hispanic Health & Human Services).
- 1999: Antarctica's Giant Petrels and Antarctica — Cold facts on Climate Change (both for CNN).
- 2002: Blue Frontier (Video News Release).

== Bibliography ==
Books

- Helvarg, David, The War Against the Greens, (San Francisco: Sierra Club, 1994) ISBN 0-87156-459-9
  - Helvarg, David, The War Against the Greens (Revised Edition), (Boulder: Johnson, 2004) ISBN 1-55566-328-1
- Helvarg, David, Blue Frontier—Saving America's Living Seas, (New York: WH Freeman, 2001) ISBN 0-7167-3715-9
- Helvarg, David with Jim Toomey (Illustrator), 50 Ways to Save the Ocean (Inner Ocean Action Guide), (Maui, Hawai'i: Inner Ocean Publishing, 2006) ISBN 1-930722-66-4
- Helvarg, David (ed.), The Ocean and Coastal Conservation Guide (Island Press, 2005) ISBN 1-55963-859-1
- Motavalli, Jim (ed.), Feeling the Heat—Reports from the Frontlines of Climate Change, (New York: Routledge, 2004) ISBN 0-415-94655-7
- Helvarg, David, The Golden Shore: California’s Love Affair with the Sea, (Thomas Dunne Books, 2013) ISBN 9780312664961

Selected Articles

- "Ireland Diary; A Day in the Life." — San Diego Door, August 1974.
- "On a mission with the Sandinistas." — Associated Press, June 19, 1979.
- "San Diego and Central America." — San Diego Newsline, June 27, 1984.
- "John Hoagland in life and Death." — San Diego Tribune, March 1984.
- "Jonas Salk - A Conversation with the Old Master." — San Diego magazine, November 1984.
- "Green War." — The Berkeley Monthly, August 1994.
- "Fiddling While Antarctica Burns." — The New York Times, March 17, 1999
- "Seaweed Rebellion" — Penthouse, March, 2001
- "On The Blue Frontier" — E Magazine, July/Aug. 2001
- "Otter Things in California" — Satya, January 2004
- "SpongeBob and Friends: Splendor in the Kelp" — Los Angeles Times, January 26, 2005
