= Jaws (novel) =

1974 novel by Peter Benchley

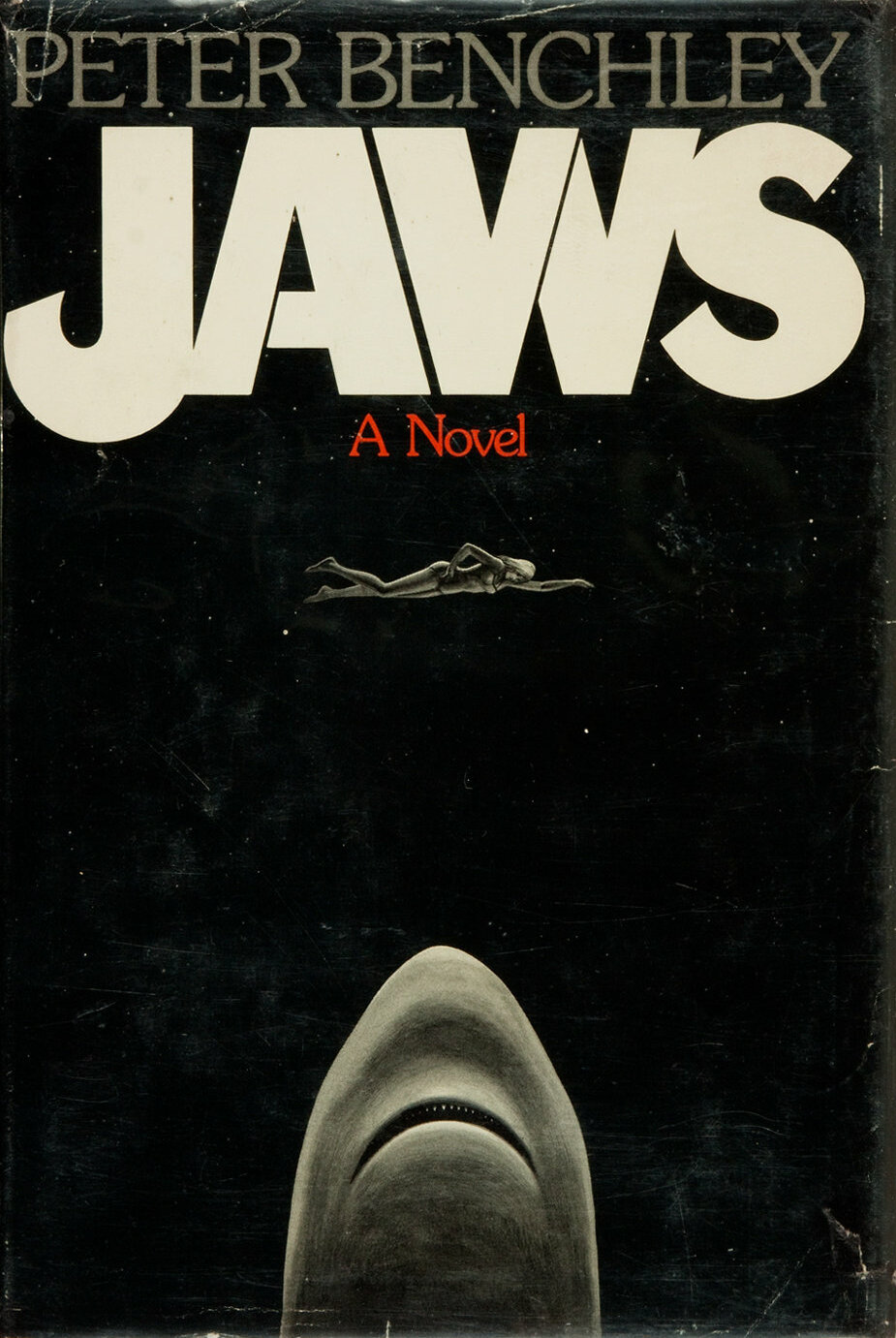
- Cover of the first hardcover edition, illustrated by Paul Bacon
- Author: Peter Benchley
- Cover artist: Paul Bacon (hardcover); Roger Kastel (paperback)
- Language: English
- Genre: Thriller
- Publisher: Doubleday (hardcover); Bantam (paperback)
- Publication date: February 1974
- Publication place: United States
- Pages: 311 (hardcover)
- LC Class: PS3552.E537

Jaws is a novel by American writer Peter Benchley, published by Doubleday in 1974. It tells the story of a large great white shark that preys upon a small Long Island resort town and the three men who attempt to kill it. The novel grew out of Benchley's interest in shark attacks after he read about the exploits of Frank Mundus, a shark fisherman from Montauk, New York, in 1964. Doubleday commissioned Benchley to write the novel in 1971, a period when the writer worked as a freelance journalist.

Through a marketing campaign orchestrated by Doubleday and paperback publisher Bantam Books, Jaws was incorporated into many book sales clubs catalogues and attracted media interest. First published in February 1974, Jaws was a great success; the hardback remained on the bestseller list for 44 weeks and the subsequent paperback edition sold millions of copies, beginning in 1975. Although literary critics acknowledged the novel's effective suspense, reviews were generally mixed, with many finding Benchley's prose and characterizations amateurish and banal.

Film producers Richard D. Zanuck and David Brown read the novel before its publication and purchased the film rights. Steven Spielberg was selected to direct the movie adaptation, Jaws, released in June 1975. Spielberg's film omitted all of the novel's subplots and focused primarily on the shark and the characterizations of the three protagonists. The film version of Jaws is credited as the first summer blockbuster and was the highest-grossing film in motion picture history up to that time. Three sequels (with no involvement from Spielberg) followed the film, all of which were met with mixed to negative responses.

== Synopsis ==
Jaws is set in the fictional town of Amity, a small, seaside resort located on the south shore of Long Island, halfway between Bridgehampton and East Hampton. One night, after her intoxicated date passes out on the beach, a young woman named Christine "Chrissy" Watkins skinny dips alone in the ocean where she is attacked and killed by a massive great white shark. The next morning, her partially eaten remains are found washed up on the beach and the coroner concludes she was the victim of a shark attack. Amity Police Chief Martin Brody then orders the beaches closed, but he is overruled by mayor Larry Vaughan and the town's selectmen who fear damage to summer tourism, Amity's main source of commerce. With the collusion of Harry Meadows, editor of the local newspaper, news of the attack is kept quiet.

A few days later, the shark kills a young boy and an elderly man within half an hour of each other. Ben Gardner, a local fisherman, is hired to catch the shark but he disappears at sea. Brody and his deputy, Leonard Hendricks, discover Gardner's deserted boat anchored off-shore, covered with large bite holes, one of which has a large shark tooth stuck in it. The boy's mother and Gardner's widow angrily blame the deaths on Brody for not closing the beaches after they learn of the earlier attack on Chrissy Watkins. Wracked by guilt, Brody orders the beaches closed and has Meadows investigate Vaughan's business affairs to find out why he is so determined to keep them open. Meadows soon discovers that the mayor is heavily in debt to the Mafia who have a great deal of money invested in Amity real estate and are pressuring Vaughan to keep the beaches open in order to protect their investments; if Amity's market value should fall, Vaughan stands to lose everything, including, possibly, his life. Meadows also recruits Matt Hooper, a young, affluent ichthyologist from the Woods Hole Oceanographic Institution for help on dealing with the shark. When shown the tooth found on Gardner's boat, Hooper determines it to be from an unusually large great white shark.

Meanwhile, Ellen Brody, the Chief's wife, is suffering from depression and lamenting the loss of her youth and the privileged lifestyle she had before becoming a wife and mother. Coincidentally, when Ellen was a teenager, she dated Hooper's older brother a few years before marrying Brody. Ellen becomes fixated on Hooper as a link to the past she desperately longs for. After Hooper attends a dinner party at the Brody's, Ellen, intent on recapturing her juvenescence and joie de vivre, decides to seduce him. The following morning, she telephones Hooper at his hotel and invites him to meet her for lunch at a restaurant several miles away from Amity. At the restaurant, the two have several drinks and begin flirting with each other; following a sexually charged conversation, they go to a motel. Unable to reach neither Ellen nor Hooper by phone that afternoon, Brody begins to suspect they have had a liaison and he becomes obsessed and tormented by the thought.

After a week with no further attacks or sightings of the shark, Mayor Vaughan convinces Brody to reopen the beaches. By this time, news of the shark attacks have spread; tourists and the media flock to Amity for a glimpse of the killer shark. Brody sets up patrols along the beaches to watch for the fish. The shark returns and a teenage boy narrowly escapes another attack near the shore. Brody again closes the beaches and convinces Amity's selectmen to hire Quint, an eccentric, crusty professional fisherman, to locate and kill the shark. Brody and Hooper set out with Quint on his boat, Orca, and the tension between the three men soon escalates. Quint considers Hooper a conceited, rich kid. Hooper is angry over Quint's methods when he disembowels a blue shark and uses an illegally caught unborn baby dolphin as bait. Brody has been wary of Hooper since his arrival in Amity, jealous of his youth, wealth and his connection to Ellen; his suspicions about Hooper and Ellen increase, as he discovers more circumstantial evidence that points to a possible tryst between them.

Their first day at sea is unproductive, but the three come in contact with the shark by the end of the second day. Upon seeing the fish for the first time and estimating the shark to be at least 20 ft (6.1 m) in length and weighing in at roughly 5,000 lb (2,300 kg), Hooper is visibly excited and in awe at the size of it.

Larry Vaughan visits the Brody house and informs Ellen that he and his wife are leaving Amity. Vaughan speculates on the life he might have led had he married Ellen. After he leaves, Ellen reflects on her life and she realizes the mistake she made missing the life she had before marrying Brody. When Brody returns home a short time later, Ellen kisses him passionately.

On the third day, Hooper wants to bring along a shark-proof cage, in an attempt to kill the fish with a bang stick. Initially, Quint refuses to bring the cage on board, considering it a suicidal idea, but he relents after Hooper pays him $100. Brody tells Quint he will not be paid if he brings the cage on board which angers Hooper and a heated argument between Brody and Hooper ensues. Unable to control his temper, Brody physically attacks Hooper and strangles him for several seconds. With no resolution, the men decide to head out with the shark cage onboard. After several unsuccessful attempts by Quint to harpoon the shark, Hooper goes underwater in the shark cage. The shark attacks the cage, something Hooper did not expect. After destroying the cage, the shark kills and eats Hooper. Brody is horrified and is now convinced the shark can't be killed. He tells Quint that after Hooper's death the town may no longer pay him, but Quint is now determined to kill the shark regardless of the money.

Quint and Brody return to sea the next day. After the shark attacks the Orca and Quint harpoons it several more times, the fish leaps out of the water and onto the stern of the boat, smashing the transom. Orca begins to sink and Quint plunges another harpoon into the shark's belly. As the fish settles back into the water, Quint's foot becomes entangled in the rope attached to the harpoon and he is pulled underwater and drowns. Brody, now staying afloat on a seat cushion, watches the shark slowly swim towards him; he closes his eyes and prepares for death. Just as it reaches Brody, the shark succumbs to its wounds before it can attack. Slowly, the dead shark begins to sink. The lone survivor of the ordeal, Brody watches the lifeless shark spiral downward and disappear into the depths, dragging Quint's body, still entangled in the harpoon rope, with it; he then begins to paddle back to shore on his makeshift float.

== Development ==
Peter Benchley had long been fascinated with sharks, which he frequently encountered while fishing in Nantucket with his father, Nathaniel Benchley. For years, the younger Benchley had considered writing "a story about a shark that attacks people and what would happen if it came in and wouldn't go away." This interest grew greater after reading a news story in 1964 about Frank Mundus, a fisherman who caught a great white shark weighing 4,550 pounds (2,060 kg) off the shore of Montauk, New York.

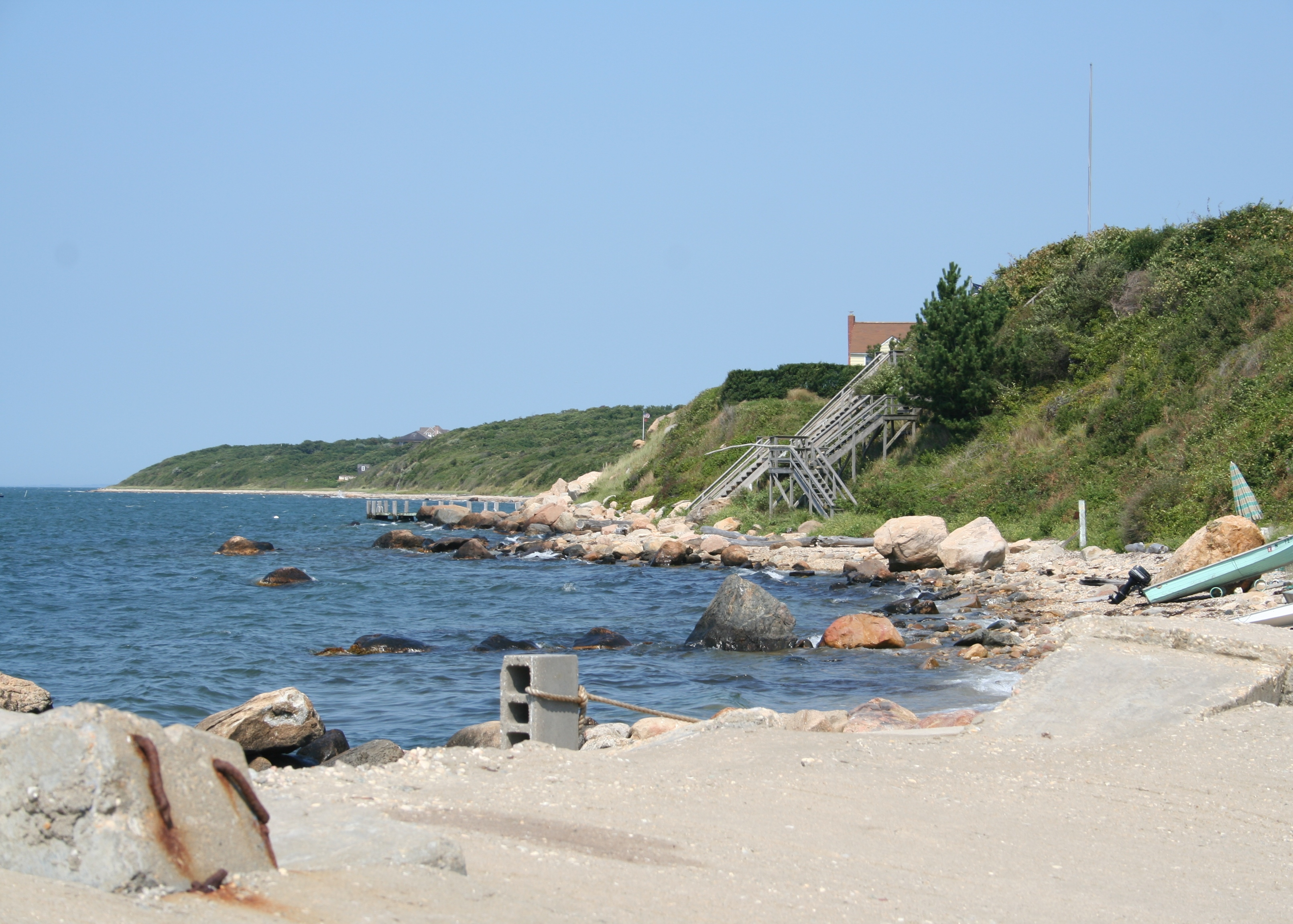
Peter Benchley was inspired by a shark being captured in Montauk, New York.

In 1971, Benchley was a freelance writer, struggling to support his wife and children. In the meantime, his literary agent scheduled regular meetings with publishing house editors. One was Doubleday editor Thomas Congdon, who met with Benchley seeking book ideas. Congdon did not find Benchley's proposals for non-fiction interesting, but instead favored his idea for a novel about a shark terrorizing a beach resort. Benchley sent an outline page to Congdon's office, and the editor paid him $1,000 for 100 pages. These pages comprised the first four chapters, and the full manuscript received a $7,500 total advance (equivalent to $59,624 in 2025).

Congdon and the Doubleday crew were confident, seeing Benchley as "something of an expert in sharks", given the author self-described "knowing as much as any amateur about sharks" as he had read some research books and seen the 1971 documentary Blue Water White Death. After Doubleday commissioned the book, Benchley then started researching all possible material regarding sharks. Among his sources were Peter Matthiessen's Blue Meridian, Jacques Cousteau's The Shark: Splendid Savage of the Sea, Thomas B. Allen's Shadows in the Sea, and David H. Davies' About Sharks and Shark Attacks.

Benchley procrastinated finishing the novel and only began writing in earnest once his agent reminded him that if he did not deliver the manuscript, he would have to return the $7,500 writer's advance. As this money had long been spent, Benchley had no choice. His hastily written first-draft partial manuscript was derided by Congdon, who did not like its comic tone. Congdon only approved the first five pages, which made it into the published book without any revisions, and asked Benchley to follow the tone of that introduction. A month later, Benchley delivered a broader outline of the story and rewritten chapters to which Congdon gave his approval.

The manuscript took Benchley a year and a half to complete. Benchley worked on the novel in a makeshift office above a furnace company in Pennington, New Jersey during the winter months. In the summer, he moved to a converted turkey coop on the seaside property of his in-laws in Stonington, Connecticut. Congdon dictated some changes to the rest of the book, including a sex scene between Brody and Ellen which was later changed to Ellen and Hooper. Congdon did not feel that there was "any place for this wholesome marital sex in this kind of book". After various rewrites, revisions, edits and sporadic advance payments, Benchley delivered his final draft of the untitled manuscript in January, 1973.

=== Title and cover ===
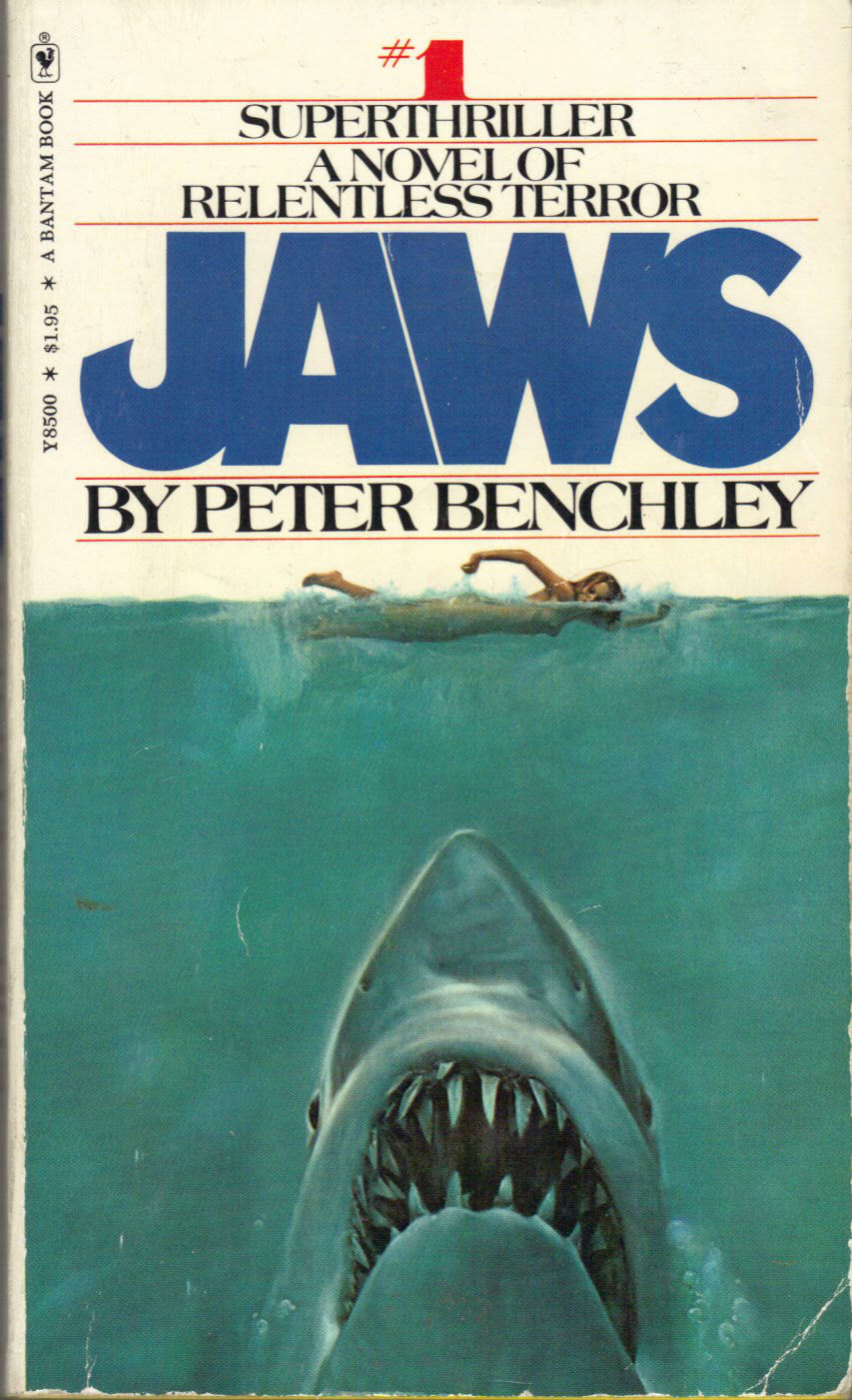
Bantam Books requested a new cover for the paperback edition, and the now iconic artwork by Roger Kastel was reused for the Jaws film posters.

Benchley had still not decided on a title by the time the book was ready to go to press. He had considered several titles during development, many of which he called "pretentious", such as The Stillness in the Water and Leviathan Rising. Benchley regarded other ideas, such as The Jaws of Death and The Jaws of Leviathan, as "melodramatic, weird or pretentious". Congdon and Benchley brainstormed about the title frequently, with the writer estimating that around 125 ideas had been raised. The novel still did not have a title until twenty minutes before production of the book. Benchley discussed the problem with Congdon over lunch in New York:

We cannot agree on a word that we like, let alone a title that we like. In fact, the only word that even means anything, that even says anything, is "jaws". Call the book Jaws. He said "What does it mean?" I said, "I don't know, but it's short; it fits on a jacket, and it may work." He said, "Okay, we'll call the thing Jaws.

For the cover, Benchley wanted an illustration of the town of Amity as seen through the jaws of a shark. Doubleday's design director, Alex Gotfryd, assigned book illustrator Wendell Minor with the task. The image was eventually vetoed for sexual overtones, compared by sales managers to the vagina dentata. Congdon and Gotfryd eventually settled on printing a typographical jacket, but that was subsequently discarded once Bantam editor Oscar Dystel noted the title Jaws was so vague "it could have been a title about dentistry". Gotfryd tried to get Minor to do a new cover, but he was out of town, so he instead turned to artist Paul Bacon. Bacon drew an enormous shark head, and Gotfryd suggested adding a swimmer "to have a sense of disaster and a sense of scale". The subsequent drawing became the eventual hardcover art, with a shark head rising towards a swimming woman.

Despite the acceptance of the Bacon cover by Doubleday, Dystel did not like the cover, and assigned New York illustrator Roger Kastel to do a different one for the paperback. Following Bacon's basic concept, Kastel illustrated his favorite part of the novel, the opening where the shark attacks Christine Watkins. For research, Kastel went to the American Museum of Natural History, and took advantage of the shark exhibits being closed for cleaning to photograph the models. The photographs then provided reference for a "ferocious-looking shark that was still realistic." In actuality, the stuffed shark Kastel chose for his reference was not a great white shark, but a mako shark. After painting the shark, Kastel did the female swimmer. Following a photoshoot for Good Housekeeping, Kastel requested the model he was photographing to lie on a stool in the approximate position of a front crawl. The oil-on-board painting Kastel created for the cover would eventually be reused by Universal Pictures for the film posters and advertising, albeit slightly bowdlerized with the woman's naked body partially obscured with more sea foam. The original painting of the cover was stolen and has never been recovered, leaving Bacon to speculate that some Hollywood executive now has it.

== Themes and style ==
The story of Jaws is limited by how the humans respond to the shark menace. Much detail is given to the shark, with descriptions of its anatomy and presence creating the sense of an awesome, unstoppable threat. Elevating the menace are violent descriptions of the shark attacks. Along with a carnivorous killer on the sea, Amity is populated with equally predatory humans: the mayor who has ties with the Mafia, a depressed, adulterous housewife and criminals among the tourists.

The novel contained 1970s cultural themes of a frayed marriage, a financially strapped town and distrust of the local government, in an era when divorces were on the rise, unemployment was high, and the political scandals of President Nixon and others had eroded the public's trust .

In the meantime, the impact of the predatory deaths resemble Henrik Ibsen's play An Enemy of the People, with the mayor of a small town panicking over how a problem will drive away the tourists. Another source of comparison raised by critics was Moby-Dick, particularly regarding Quint's characterization and the ending featuring a confrontation with the shark; Quint even dies the same way as Captain Ahab. The central character, Chief Brody, fits a common characterization of the disaster genre, an authority figure who is forced to provide guidance to those affected by the sudden tragedy. Focusing on a working class local leads the book's prose to describe the beachgoers with contempt, and Brody to have conflicts with the rich outsider Hooper.

== Publication history ==
"I knew that Jaws couldn't possibly be successful. It was a first novel, and nobody reads first novels. It was a first novel about a fish, so who cares?"

— Peter Benchley

Benchley said that neither he nor anyone else involved in Jaws conception initially realized the book's potential. Tom Congdon, however, sensed that the novel had prospects and had it sent to the Book of the Month Club and paperback original houses. The Book of the Month Club made it an "A" book, qualifying it for its main selection. Reader's Digest Condensed Books also selected it (removing the adult themes and language). The publication date was moved back to allow a carefully orchestrated release. It was released first in hardcover in February 1974, then in the book clubs, followed by a national campaign for the paperback release. Bantam bought the paperback rights for $575,000, which Benchley points out was "then an enormous sum of money". After Bantam's rights expired years later, they reverted to Benchley, who subsequently sold the rights to Random House, who has since published all the reprints of Jaws.

Upon the book's release, Jaws became a great success. According to John Baxter's biography of Steven Spielberg, the novel's first entry on California's best-seller list was caused by Spielberg and producers Richard D. Zanuck and David Brown, who were on pre-production for the Jaws film, buying a hundred copies of the novel each, most of which were sent to "opinion-makers and members of the chattering class". Jaws was the state's most successful book by 7 p.m. on the first day. However, sales were good nationwide without engineering. The hardcover edition stayed on The New York Times bestseller list for 44 weeks – peaking at number two behind Watership Down – selling a total of 125,000 copies. The paperback version was even more successful, topping book charts worldwide, and by the time the film adaptation debuted in June, 1975, the novel had sold 5.5 million copies domestically, a number that eventually reached 9.5 million copies. Worldwide sales are estimated at 20 million copies. The success inspired ABC to invite Benchley for an episode of The American Sportsman, where the writer swam with sharks in Australia, in what would be the first of many nature-related television programs Benchley would take part in.

=== Audio adaptations ===
A 6-part abridged adaptation read by John Guerrasio was broadcast on BBC Radio 7 in 2008. In 2018, an abridged adaptation in 10 parts and read by Henry Goodman was broadcast on BBC Radio 4 as part of its Book at Bedtime program.

An unabridged audio adaptation read by Erik Steele was released by Blackstone Audio in both CD and downloadable format in 2009. A French translation, Les Dents de la Mer, read by Pascal Casanova was released exclusively by Audible Studios in downloadable format in 2018.

== Critical reception ==
Despite the enormous commercial success of Jaws, reviews of the novel were mixed. The most common criticism focused on the human characters. Michael A. Rogers of Rolling Stone declared that "None of the humans are particularly likable or interesting" and confessed the shark was his favorite character, "and one suspects Benchley's also." Steven Spielberg shared the sentiment, saying he initially found many of the characters unsympathetic and wanted the shark to "win", a characterization he changed in the film adaptation.

Critics also derided Benchley's writing. Time reviewer John Skow described the novel as "cliché and crude literary calculation", where events "refuse to take on life and momentum" and the climax "lacks only Queequeg's coffin to resemble a bath tub version of Moby-Dick." Writing for The Village Voice, Donald Newlove declared that "Jaws has rubber teeth for a plot. It's boring, pointless, listless; if there's a trite turn to make, Jaws will make that turn." An article in The Listener criticized the plot, stating the "novel only has bite, so to say, at feed time," and these scenes are "naïve attempts at whipping along a flagging story-line." Andrew Bergman of The New York Times Book Review felt that despite the book serving as "fluid entertainment", "passages of hollow portentousness creep in" while poor scene "connections [and] stark manipulations impair the narrative."

Some reviewers found Jaws's description of the shark attacks entertaining. John Spurling of the New Statesman asserted that while the "characterisation of the humans is fairly rudimentary", the shark "is done with exhilarating and alarming skill, and every scene in which it appears is imagined at a special pitch of intensity." Christopher Lehmann-Haupt praised the novel in a short review for The New York Times, highlighting the "strong plot" and "rich thematic substructure." The Washington Post's Robert F. Jones described Jaws as "much more than a gripping fish story. It is a tightly written, tautly paced study," which "forged and touched a metaphor that still makes us tingle whenever we enter the water." New York reviewer Eliot Fremont-Smith found the novel "immensely readable" despite the lack of "memorable characters or much plot surprise or originality"; Fremont-Smith wrote that Benchley "fulfills all expectations, provides just enough civics and ecology to make us feel good, and tops it off with a really terrific and grisly battle scene".

In the years following publication, Benchley began to feel responsible for the negative attitudes against sharks that his novel engendered. He became an ardent ocean conservationist. In an article for the National Geographic published in 2000, Benchley writes "considering the knowledge accumulated about sharks in the last 25 years, I couldn't possibly write Jaws today ... not in good conscience anyway. Back then, it was generally accepted that great whites were anthropophagus (they ate people) by choice. Now we know that almost every shark attack on a human is an accident: A shark mistakes a human for its normal prey." Upon his death in 2006, Benchley's widow Wendy declared the author "kept telling people the book was fiction", and comparing Jaws to The Godfather, "he took no more responsibility for the fear of sharks than Mario Puzo took responsibility for the Mafia."

== Film adaptation ==
Richard D. Zanuck and David Brown, film producers at Universal Pictures, both heard about the book before publication at the same time. Upon reading it, both agreed the novel was exciting and deserved a feature film adaptation, even if they were unsure how to accomplish it. Benchley's agent sold the adaptation rights for $150,000, plus an extra $25,000 for Benchley to write the screenplay. Although this delighted the author, who had very little money at the time, it was a comparatively low sum, as the agreement occurred before the book became a surprise bestseller. After securing the rights, Steven Spielberg, who was making his first theatrical film, The Sugarland Express, for Zanuck, Brown and Universal, was hired as the director. To play the protagonists, the producers cast Robert Shaw as Quint, Roy Scheider as Brody and Richard Dreyfuss as Hooper.

Benchley's contract promised him the first draft of the Jaws screenplay. He wrote three drafts before passing the job over to other writers; the screenplay is credited to Benchley and actor-writer Carl Gottlieb who wrote the majority of the final script and appears in the film in the small role of newspaper editor Harry Meadows. Benchley also has a cameo role in the film, playing a TV news reporter. For the film adaptation, Spielberg wanted to preserve the novel's basic concept while removing Benchley's subplots and altering the characterizations, having found all of the characters of the book unlikable. Among the film's notable differences from the novel are the omission of the adulterous affair between Ellen Brody and Matt Hooper and Mayor Larry Vaughn's connections to the Mafia. Harry Meadows, a major character in the novel, is reduced to a peripheral character in the film; several other characters from the novel do not appear in the film. In the novel, it is implied that Quint may be a former Marine; in the film, he became a survivor of the World War II USS Indianapolis disaster. In the novel, Hooper, in the shark cage, is killed by the shark but in the film, he survives. In the film, Quint is killed and eaten by the shark; in the novel, he accidentally drowns. The shark's death is caused by a scuba tank explosion in the film, rather than the extensive wounds from Quint's harpoon, as in the novel. Spielberg estimated the final script had a total of 27 scenes that were not in the book. The location of Amity was also changed; while scouting the book's Long Island setting, Brown found it "too grand" and not fitting the idea of "a vacation area that was lower middle class enough so that an appearance of a shark would destroy the tourist business." Thus, Amity was changed from a coastal town on Long Island, to a small island in New England (filmed on Martha's Vineyard, Massachusetts).

Released in theaters in 1975, Jaws became the highest-grossing film ever at the time, a record it held for two years until the release of Star Wars. Benchley was satisfied with the adaptation, noting how dropping the subplots allowed for "all the little details that fleshed out the characters". The film's success led to three sequels, with which Benchley had no involvement despite them drawing on his characters. According to Benchley, once when his payment of the adaptation-related royalties didn't arrive as expected, he called his agent and she informed him that the studio was arranging a deal for sequels. Benchley disliked the idea, saying, "I don't care about sequels; who'll ever want to make a sequel to a movie about a fish?" He subsequently chose a one-time payment of $70,000 for each of the three sequels, relinquishing continuing royalties for future sequels.

== Bibliography ==
- Baxter, John (1997). Steven Spielberg: The Unauthorised Biography. London: Harper Collins. ISBN 0-00-638444-7.
- Benchley, Peter (2006). Shark Life: True Stories About Sharks & the Sea. New York: Random HouseCollins. ISBN 0-307-54574-1.
- Brode, Douglas (1995). The Films of Steven Spielberg. New York: Carol Publishing. ISBN 0-8065-1951-7.
- Capuzzo, Michael (2001). Close to Shore: A True Story of Terror in an Age of Innocence. New York: Broadway Books. ISBN 0-7679-0413-3.
- Ellis, Richard (1983). The Book of Sharks. San Diego: Harcourt Brace Jovanovich. ISBN 0-15-613552-3.
- Fernicola, Richard G. (2002). Twelve Days of Terror: A Definitive Investigation of the 1916 New Jersey Shark Attacks. Guilford, Conn.: The Lyons Press. ISBN 1-58574-575-8.
- Friedman, Lester D.; Notbohm, Brent (2000). Steven Spielberg: Interviews. Jackson: University Press of Mississippi. ISBN 1-57806-113-X.
- Gottlieb, Carl (1975). The Jaws Log (in German). New York, New York: Dell. ISBN 978-0-440-14689-6.
- McBride, Joseph (1999). Steven Spielberg: A Biography. Cambridge, Massachusetts: Da Capo Press. ISBN 0-306-80900-1.
- Raftery, Brian (July 12, 2024). "50 Years Ago, 'Jaws' Hit Bookstores, Capturing the Angst of a Generation". The New York Times Book Review.
- Yule, Andrew (1996). Steven Spielberg: Father to the Man. London: Little, Brown and Company. ISBN 0-316-91363-4.
