= 29th British Academy Film Awards =

1976 film awards ceremony

- Date: 17 March 1976
- Site: Royal Albert Hall
- Hosted by: Diana Rigg; Eamonn Andrews

Highlights
- Best Film: Alice Doesn't Live Here Anymore
- Best Actor: Al Pacino; Dog Day Afternoon and The Godfather Part II
- Best Actress: Ellen Burstyn; Alice Doesn't Live Here Anymore
- Most awards: Alice Doesn't Live Here Anymore (4)
- Most nominations: Alice Doesn't Live Here Anymore and Jaws (7)

The 29th British Academy Film Awards, more commonly known as the BAFTAs, took place on 17 March 1976 at the Royal Albert Hall in London, honouring the best national and foreign films of 1975. Presented by the British Academy of Film and Television Arts, accolades were handed out for the best feature-length film and documentaries of any nationality that were screened at British cinemas in 1975.

Martin Scorsese's Alice Doesn't Live Here Anymore won the award for Best Film, Screenplay (Robert Getchell), Actress (Ellen Burstyn) and Supporting Actress (Diane Ladd). The film received a total of 4 awards. Al Pacino received Best Actor for his performances in Dog Day Afternoon and The Godfather Part II. Fred Astaire took home Best Supporting Actor for The Towering Inferno.

The ceremony was hosted by Diana Rigg and Eamonn Andrews.

== Winners and nominees ==
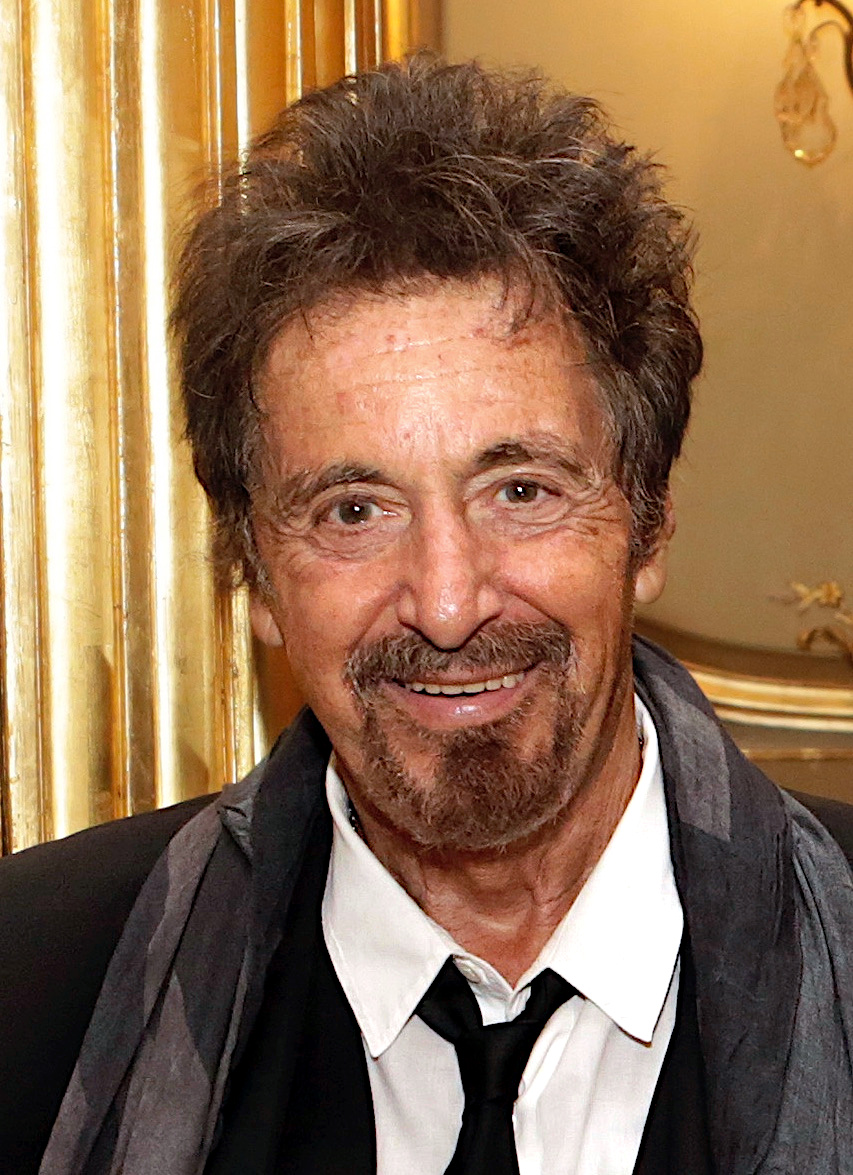
Al Pacino, Best Actor winner

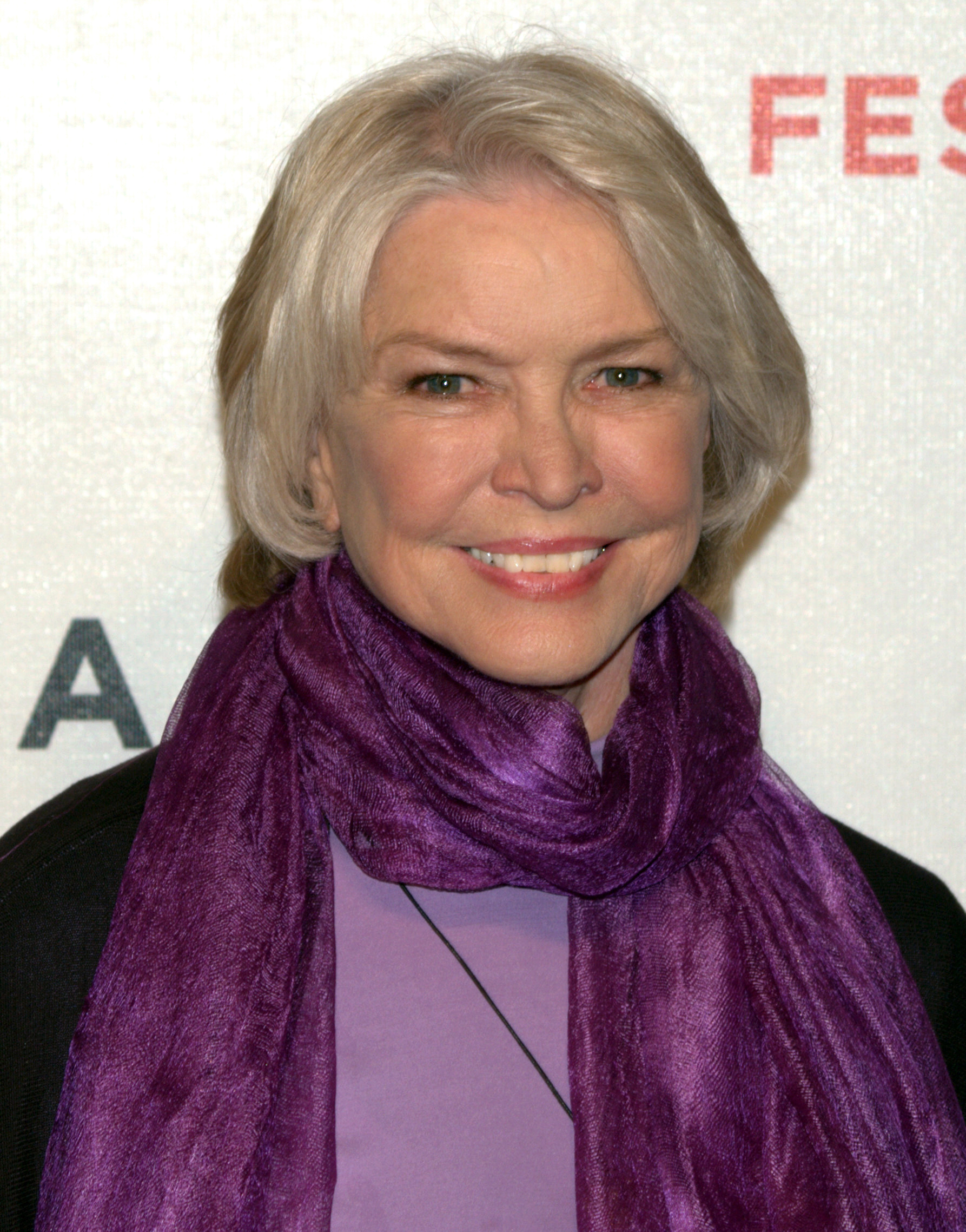
Ellen Burstyn, Best Actress winner

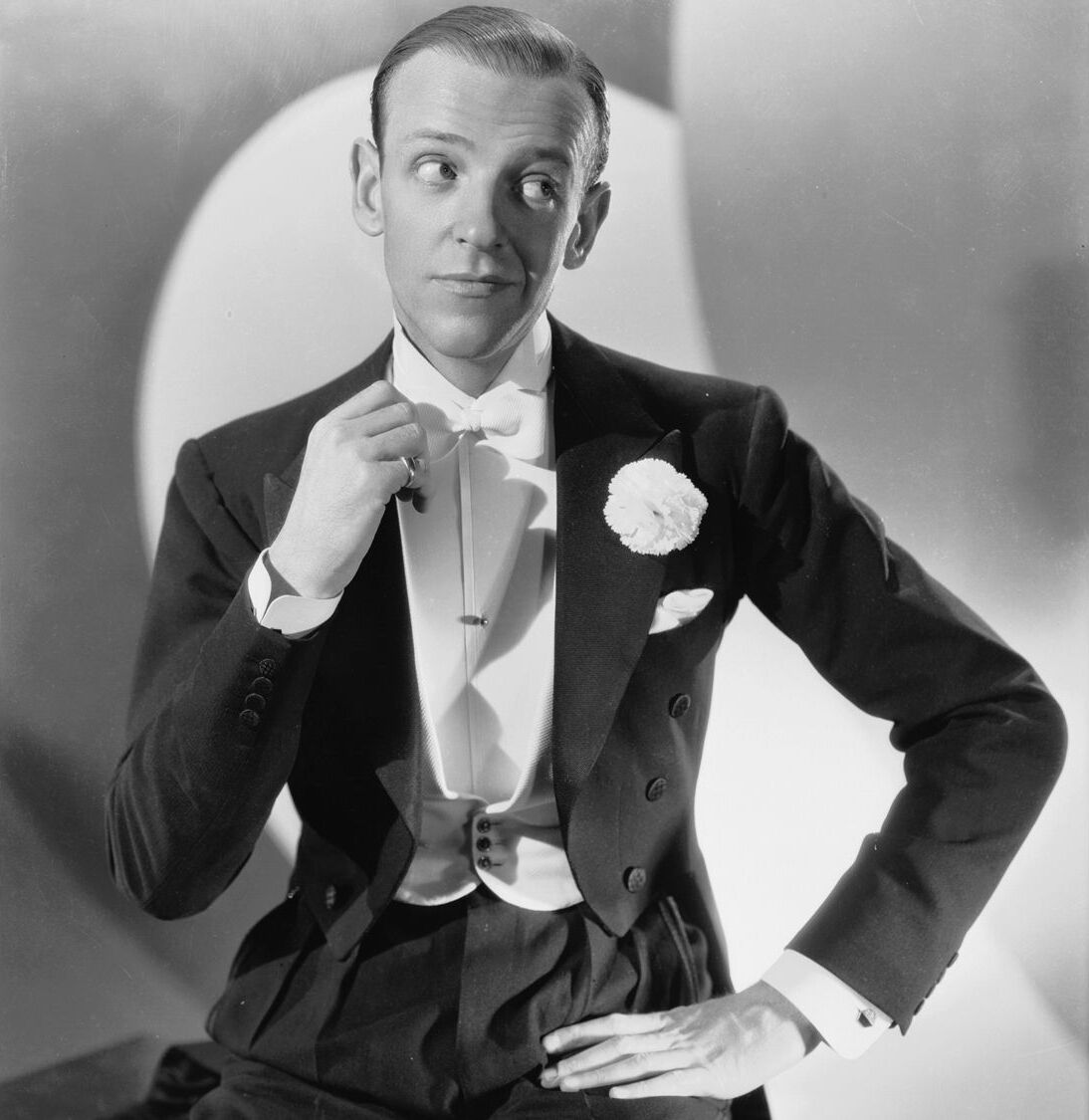
Fred Astaire, Best Supporting Actor winner

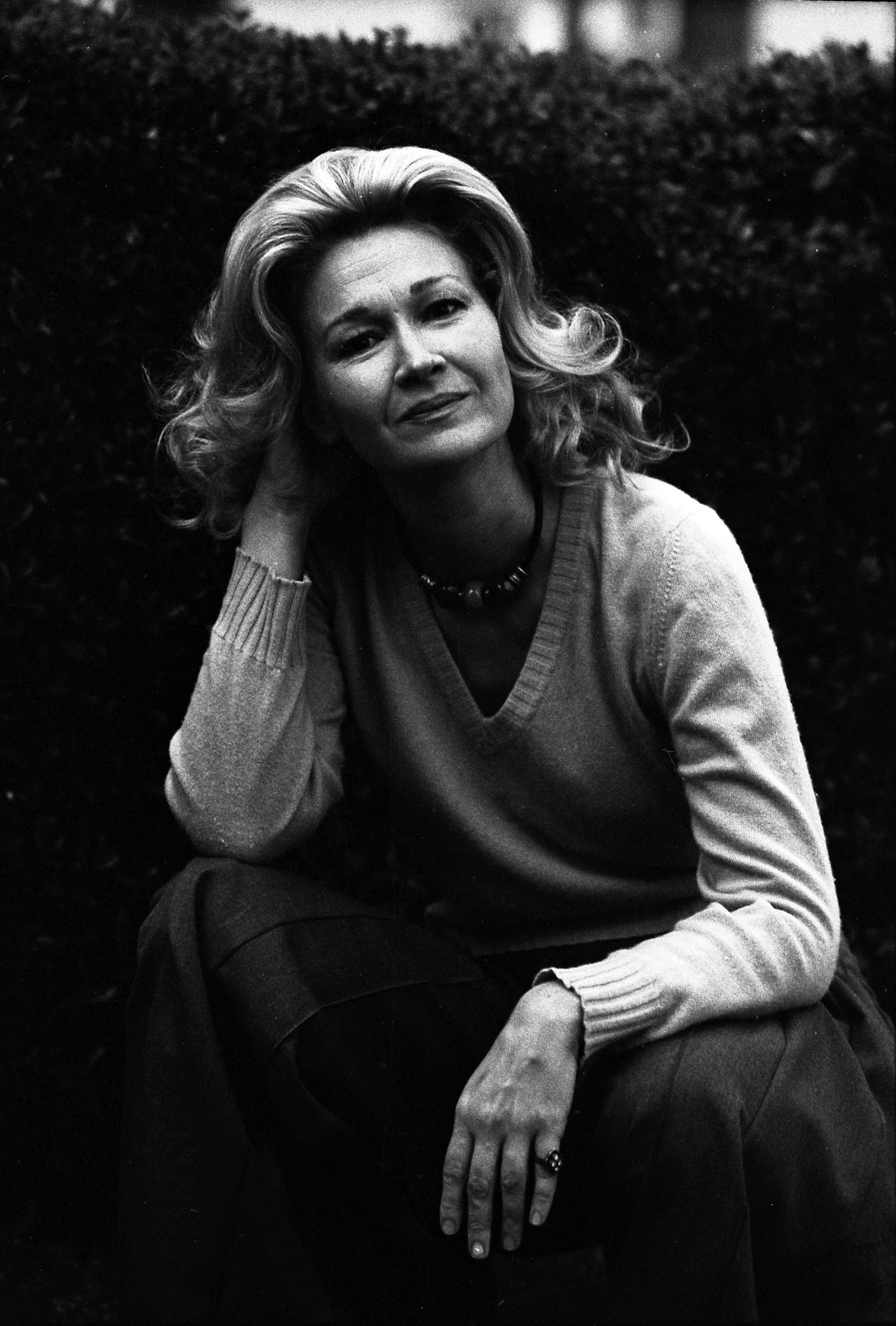
Diane Ladd, Best Supporting Actress winner

=== BAFTA Fellowship ===
- **Charlie Chaplin** and **Laurence Olivier**

=== Awards ===
Winners are listed first and highlighted in boldface.

**Best Film**: **Alice Doesn't Live Here Anymore – Martin Scorsese**; Barry Lyndon – Stanley Kubrick; Dog Day Afternoon – Sidney Lumet; Jaws – Steven Spielberg	**Best Direction**: **Stanley Kubrick – Barry Lyndon**; Martin Scorsese – Alice Doesn't Live Here Anymore; Sidney Lumet – Dog Day Afternoon; Steven Spielberg – Jaws
**Best Actor in a Leading Role**: **Al Pacino – Dog Day Afternoon as Sonny Wortzik**; **Al Pacino – The Godfather Part II as Michael Corleone**; Dustin Hoffman – Lenny as Lenny Bruce; Gene Hackman – French Connection II as Detective Jimmy "Popeye" Doyle; Gene Hackman – Night Moves as Harry Moseby; Richard Dreyfuss – Jaws as Matt Hooper	**Best Actress in a Leading Role**: **Ellen Burstyn – Alice Doesn't Live Here Anymore as Alice Hyatt**; Anne Bancroft – The Prisoner of Second Avenue as Edna Edison; Liv Ullmann – Scenes from a Marriage as Marianne; Valerie Perrine – Lenny as Honey Bruce
**Best Actor in a Supporting Role**: **Fred Astaire – The Towering Inferno as Harlee Claiborne**; Burgess Meredith – The Day of the Locust as Harry Greener; Jack Warden – Shampoo as Lester Karpf; Martin Balsam – The Taking of Pelham One Two Three as Harold Longman	**Best Actress in a Supporting Role**: **Diane Ladd – Alice Doesn't Live Here Anymore as Florence "Flo" Castleberry**; Gwen Welles – Nashville as Sueleen Gay; Lelia Goldoni – Alice Doesn't Live Here Anymore as Bea; Ronee Blakley – Nashville as Barbara Jean
**Best Screenplay**: **Alice Doesn't Live Here Anymore – Robert Getchell**; Dog Day Afternoon – Frank Pierson; Jaws – Peter Benchley and Carl Gottlieb; Nashville – Joan Tewkesbury	**Best Cinematography**: **Barry Lyndon – John Alcott**; The Man Who Would Be King – Oswald Morris; Rollerball – Douglas Slocombe; The Towering Inferno – Fred J. Koenekamp
**Best Costume Design**: **The Day of the Locust – Ann Roth**; Barry Lyndon – Ulla-Britt Söderlund and Milena Canonero; The Four Musketeers – Yvonne Blake; The Man Who Would Be King – Edith Head	**Best Editing**: **Dog Day Afternoon – Dede Allen**; The Godfather Part II – Peter Zinner, Barry Malkin and Richard Marks; Jaws – Verna Fields; Rollerball – Antony Gibbs
**Best Original Music**: **Jaws / The Towering Inferno – John Williams**; The Godfather Part II – Nino Rota; The Taking of Pelham One Two Three – David Shire; The Wind and the Lion – Jerry Goldsmith	**Best Production Design**: **Rollerball – John Box**; Barry Lyndon – Ken Adam; The Day of the Locust – Richard Macdonald; The Towering Inferno – William J. Creber
**Best Sound**: **Nashville – William A. Sawyer, Jim Webb, Chris McLaughlin and Richard Portman**; Dog Day Afternoon – Jack Fitzstephens, Richard Cirincione, Sandy Rackow, Stephen A. Rotter, James Sabat and Dick Vorisek; Jaws – John Carter and Robert Hoyt; Rollerball – Les Wiggins, Archie Ludski, Derek Ball and Gordon McCallum	**Best Short Animation**: **Great – Bob Godfrey**; The Owl Who Married a Goose: An Eskimo Legend – Caroline Leaf
**Best Documentary**: **The Early Americans – Alan Pendry**; Seven Green Bottles – Eric Marquis	**Best Specialised Film**: **The Curiosity That Kills The Cat – Cedric Maggs**; How an Aeroplane Flies: Part 1 – Derek Armstrong; The Oil in Your Engine – Phillip Owtram
**John Grierson Award**: **Sea Area Forties – John Armstrong**; Leaving Lily – Graham Baker; The Living Woodland – Ronald Eastman; Waiting on Weather – Ron Granville	**United Nations Award**: **Conrack – Martin Ritt**
**Most Promising Newcomer to Leading Film Roles**: **Valerie Perrine – Lenny as Honey Bruce**; Alfred Lutter – Alice Doesn't Live Here Anymore as Tommy Hyatt; Lily Tomlin – Nashville as Linnea Reese; Robert De Niro – The Godfather Part II as Vito Corleone

== Statistics ==
Films that received multiple nominations
Nominations	Film
7	Alice Doesn't Live Here Anymore
7	Jaws
6	Dog Day Afternoon
5	Barry Lyndon
5	Nashville
4	The Godfather Part II
4	Rollerball
4	The Towering Inferno
3	The Day of the Locust
3	Lenny
2	The Man Who Would Be King
2	The Taking of Pelham One Two Three

Films that received multiple awards
Awards	Film
4	Alice Doesn't Live Here Anymore
2	Barry Lyndon
2	Dog Day Afternoon
2	The Towering Inferno

== See also ==
- 48th Academy Awards
- 1st César Awards
- 28th Directors Guild of America Awards
- 33rd Golden Globe Awards
- 2nd Saturn Awards
- 28th Writers Guild of America Awards
