= Roger Heman =

Roger Heman may refer to:

- Roger Heman Sr. (1898-1969), American sound engineer
- Roger Heman Jr (1932-1989), American sound engineer and son of Heman Sr.
