= Roger Heman Jr =

American sound engineer

Roger Heman
- Born: March 28, 1932
- Died: November 13, 1989 (aged 57)
- Occupation: Sound engineer
- Years active: 1968–1987

Roger Heman (March 28, 1932 – November 13, 1989) was an American sound engineer. He won an Academy Award for Best Sound and was nominated for another one in the same category. His father was also a sound engineer and also won an Academy Award, for Best Effects, Special Effects for Crash Dive.

Heman Jr. died of lung cancer at the age of 57.

== Awards and nominations ==
- Won an Academy Award for Jaws (1975), shared with Robert L. Hoyt, Earl Madery and John Carter
- Nominated for an Academy Award for Coal Miner's Daughter (1980), shared with Richard Portman and Jim Alexander
- Nominated for a BAFTA Award for Best Sound for Coal Miner's Daughter, shared with Gordon Ecker, Richard Portman and James Alexander
- Nominated for a Primetime Emmy for Outstanding Achievement in Film Sound Mixing for the 1970 TV movie My Sweet Charlie, shared with John Stransky Jr., Melvin M. Metcalfe Sr. and Clarence Self
