= Robert Hoyt (sound engineer) =

American sound engineer (1925–2012)

- Born: Robert Lee Hoyt; December 23, 1925; California, U.S.
- Died: September 9, 2012 (aged 86); Tarzana, California, U.S.
- Occupation: Sound engineer
- Years active: 1954–1990

Robert Lee Hoyt (December 23, 1925 – September 9, 2012) was an American sound engineer. He won an Academy Award for Best Sound for the film Jaws.

Hoyt served in the armed forces during World War II. He died in Tarzana, California on September 9, 2012, at the age of 86.

== Selected filmography ==
- Jaws (1975; co-won with Roger Heman Jr., Earl Madery and John Carter)
