= 28th Directors Guild of America Awards =

- Date: 1976
- Country: United States
- Presented by: Directors Guild of America

Highlights
- Best Director Feature Film: One Flew Over the Cuckoo's Nest – Miloš Forman
- Website: https://www.dga.org/Awards/History/1970s/1975.aspx?value=1975

The 28th Directors Guild of America Awards, honoring the outstanding directorial achievements in film and television in 1975, were presented in 1976.

== Winners and nominees ==
=== Film ===
Feature Film

Miloš Forman – One Flew Over the Cuckoo's Nest

- Robert Altman – Nashville
- Stanley Kubrick – Barry Lyndon
- Sidney Lumet – Dog Day Afternoon
- Steven Spielberg – Jaws

=== Television ===
Drama Series

James Cellan Jones – Jennie: Lady Randolph Churchill

- David Friedkin – Kojak for "How Cruel The Frost, How Bright The Stars"
- George Schaefer – Sandburg's Lincoln
Comedy Series

Hy Averback – M*A*S*H for "Bombed"

- Hal Cooper – Maude
- Joan Darling – Mary Tyler Moore for "Chuckles Bites the Dust"
Movies for Television and Mini-Series

Sam O'Steen – Queen of the Stardust Ballroom

- Lamont Johnson – Fear on Trial
- Buzz Kulik – Babe
Musical Variety

Jay Sandrich – The Lily Tomlin Show

- Bill Davis – John Denver: Rocky Mountain Years
- Dwight Hemion – Steve and Eydie: Our Love Is Here to Stay
Documentary/News

Irv Drasnin – CBS Reports for "The Guns of Autumn"

- Martin Morris – Kennedy Assassination
- Howard Stringer – CBS Reports for A Tale of Two Irelands

=== Outstanding Television Director ===
- Sam O'Steen
