= 23rd Directors Guild of America Awards =

- Date: March 12, 1971
- Location: The Beverly Hilton, Beverly Hills, California
- Country: United States
- Presented by: Directors Guild of America
- Hosted by: Hal Kanter

Highlights
- Best Director Feature Film: Patton – Franklin J. Schaffner
- Best Director Television: My Sweet Charlie – Lamont Johnson
- Website: https://www.dga.org/Awards/History/1970s/1970.aspx?value=1970

The 23rd Directors Guild of America Awards, honoring the outstanding directorial achievements in film and television in 1970, were presented on March 12, 1971, at the Beverly Hilton in Beverly Hills, California. The ceremony was hosted by Hal Kanter. The feature film nominees were announced on February 19, 1971.

== Winners and nominees ==
=== Film ===
Feature Film

Franklin J. Schaffner – Patton

- Robert Altman – M*A*S*H
- Arthur Hiller – Love Story
- David Lean – Ryan's Daughter
- Bob Rafelson – Five Easy Pieces

=== Television ===
Television

Lamont Johnson – My Sweet Charlie

- Robert Day – The Bold Ones: The Senator for "A Continual Roar of Musketry"
- Walter Grauman – The Old Man Who Cried Wolf
- Stan Harris – Jack Benny's 20th Anniversary Special
- Dwight Hemion – Kraft Music Hall for "Mr. Anthony Quinn and Miss Peggy Lee"
- Buzz Kulik – A Storm in Summer
- Delbert Mann – David Copperfield
- Barry Shear – The Name of the Game for "The Enemy Before Us"
- Paul Wendkos – The Brotherhood of the Bell
