= My Sweet Charlie =

- Videotape cover
- Based on: My Sweet Charlie by David Westheimer
- Written by: Richard Levinson; William Link
- Directed by: Lamont Johnson
- Starring: Patty Duke; Al Freeman Jr.
- Theme music composer: Gil Melle
- Country of origin: United States
- Original language: English

Production
- Executive producer: Bob Banner
- Producers: Richard Levinson; William Link
- Cinematography: Gene Polito
- Editor: Edward M. Abroms
- Running time: 97 minutes
- Production company: Universal Television

Original release
- Network: NBC
- Release: January 20, 1970

My Sweet Charlie is a 1970 American made-for-television drama film directed by Lamont Johnson. The teleplay by Richard Levinson and William Link is based on the novel of the same name by David Westheimer. Produced by Universal Television and broadcast by NBC on January 20, 1970, it later had a brief theatrical release. It is considered a landmark in television films. The film was made on location in Port Bolivar, Texas.

== Synopsis ==
Set during the Civil Rights Movement, Charlie Roberts is a militant African American attorney from New York City falsely accused of murder during a demonstration in rural Texas.

Escaping from his captors, Charlie breaks into a vacant coastal vacation home, where he encounters white Marlene Chambers, an uneducated, prejudiced, unwed pregnant teenager who has been shunned by her father and boyfriend due to her pregnancy and who sought refuge in the vacant home a few weeks before Charlie arrives.

Realizing their survival depends upon their willingness to help each other, their relationship, at first defined by mutual contempt, prejudice, and hostility, slowly evolves into a touching friendship.

== Production notes ==
In 1966, Westheimer adapted his novel for a play that opened at Broadway's Longacre Theatre with Bonnie Bedelia and Louis Gossett in the leading roles. It ran for 12 previews and 31 performances.

The television production was filmed on location in Port Bolivar, Texas in 1968 and was plagued by almost as many racial tensions as those depicted in the film. According to Patty Duke in her autobiography, her friendship with Freeman led to rumors of an affair. Marijuana was planted in Duke's Galveston hotel room by locals, though it was quickly determined not to belong to Duke. Texas governor John Connally intervened with local authorities to stop harassment of the production company and Duke.

== Principal cast ==
- Patty Duke ..... Marlene Chambers
- Al Freeman Jr. ..... Charlie Roberts
- Ford Rainey ..... Treadwell

== Principal production credits ==
- Producers ..... Bob Banner, Richard Levinson, William Link
- Original Music ..... Gil Melle
- Cinematography ..... Gene Polito
- Art Direction ..... Robert Luthardt
- Costume Design ..... Charles Waldo

== Reception ==
The film earned very high ratings, with a Nielsen rating of 31.7, an audience share of 48% and a record audience for a TV movie with 18.5 million homes watching.

Both leading actors were nominated for Emmy Awards, and Patty Duke won.

== Awards and nominations ==
Year	Award	Category	Nominee(s)	Result	Ref.
1970	NAACP Image Awards	Best Program of the Year		Won	
1970	Primetime Emmy Awards	Outstanding Dramatic Program		Nominated	
1970	Primetime Emmy Awards	Outstanding Single Performance by an Actor in a Leading Role	Al Freeman Jr.	Nominated	
1970	Primetime Emmy Awards	Outstanding Single Performance by an Actress in a Leading Role	Patty Duke	Won	
1970	Primetime Emmy Awards	Outstanding Directorial Achievement in Drama	Lamont Johnson	Nominated	
1970	Primetime Emmy Awards	Outstanding Writing Achievement in Drama	Richard Levinson and William Link	Won	
1970	Primetime Emmy Awards	Outstanding Achievement in Cinematography for Entertainment Programming – For a Special or Feature Length Program Made for Television	Gene Polito	Nominated	
1970	Primetime Emmy Awards	Outstanding Achievement in Film Editing for Entertainment Programming – For a Special or Feature Length Program Made for Television	Edward M. Abroms	Won	
1970	Primetime Emmy Awards	Outstanding Achievement in Film Sound Mixing	Roger Heman Jr., Melvin Metcalfe Sr., Clarence Self, and John Stransky Jr.	Nominated	
1971	Directors Guild of America Awards	Outstanding Directorial Achievement in Television	Lamont Johnson	Won	
