= Jaws (film) =

1975 film by Steven Spielberg

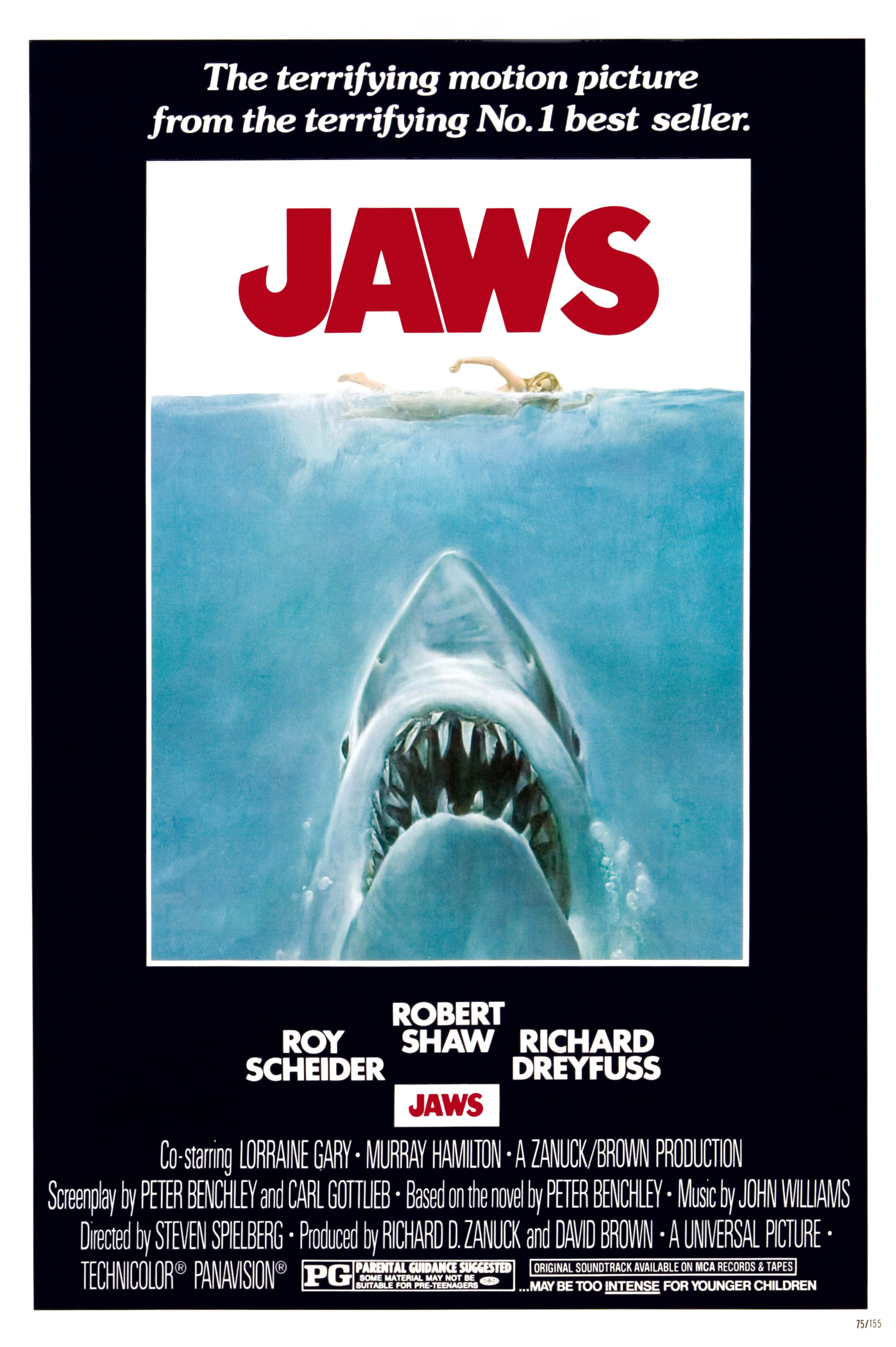
- Theatrical release poster by Roger Kastel
- Directed by: Steven Spielberg
- Screenplay by: Peter Benchley; Carl Gottlieb
- Based on: Jaws by Peter Benchley
- Produced by: Richard D. Zanuck; David Brown
- Starring: Roy Scheider; Robert Shaw; Richard Dreyfuss; Lorraine Gary; Murray Hamilton
- Cinematography: Bill Butler
- Edited by: Verna Fields
- Music by: John Williams
- Production companies: Zanuck/Brown Company; Universal Pictures
- Distributed by: Universal Pictures
- Release date: June 20, 1975
- Running time: 124 minutes
- Country: United States
- Language: English
- Budget: $9 million
- Box office: $495 million

Jaws is a 1975 American thriller film directed by Steven Spielberg, based on the 1974 novel by Peter Benchley. It stars Roy Scheider as police chief Martin Brody, who with the help of a marine biologist (Richard Dreyfuss) and a professional shark hunter (Robert Shaw) hunts a man-eating great white shark that attacks beachgoers at a New England resort town. Murray Hamilton plays the town's mayor, and Lorraine Gary portrays Brody's wife. The screenplay is credited to Benchley, who wrote the first drafts, and actor-writer Carl Gottlieb, who rewrote the script during principal photography.

Shot mostly on location at Martha's Vineyard in Massachusetts from May to October 1974, Jaws was the first major motion picture to be shot on the ocean and consequently had a troubled production, going over budget and schedule. As the art department's mechanical sharks often malfunctioned, Spielberg decided mostly to suggest the shark's presence, employing an ominous and minimalist theme created by composer John Williams to indicate its impending appearances. Spielberg and others have compared this suggestive approach to that of director Alfred Hitchcock. Universal Pictures released the film to over 450 screens, an exceptionally wide release for a major studio picture at the time, accompanied by an extensive marketing campaign with heavy emphasis on television spots and tie-in merchandise.

Regarded as a turning point in motion picture history, Jaws was the prototypical summer blockbuster and won several awards for its music and editing. It was the highest-grossing film in history until the release of Star Wars two years later; both films were pivotal in establishing the modern Hollywood business model, which pursues high box-office returns from action and adventure films with simple high-concept premises, released during the summer in thousands of theaters and advertised heavily. Jaws was followed by three sequels, none of which involved Spielberg or Benchley, as well as many imitative thrillers. In 2001, the Library of Congress selected it for preservation in the United States National Film Registry.

== Plot ==
In the New England beach town of Amity Island, a young woman goes for a late-night ocean swim. An unseen force attacks and pulls her underwater. Her partial remains are found washed up on the beach the next morning. After the coroner concludes it was a shark attack, Amity police chief Martin Brody plans to close the beaches. Mayor Larry Vaughn persuades him to reconsider, fearing the town's summer economy will suffer. The coroner, apparently under pressure, now concurs with the mayor's theory that it was a boating accident. Brody reluctantly accepts their conclusion until a young boy is killed at a crowded beach. A $3,000 bounty is placed on the shark, causing an amateur shark-hunting frenzy. Quint, an eccentric local shark hunter, offers his services for $10,000. Consulting oceanographer Matt Hooper examines the woman's remains, confirming she was killed by an unusually large shark.

When local fishermen catch a tiger shark, Vaughn declares the beaches safe. A skeptical Hooper dissects the shark and, finding no human remains inside its stomach, concludes the killer shark is still active. While searching the night waters in Hooper's boat, Hooper and Brody find the half-sunken boat of Ben Gardner, a local fisherman. Hooper dons a scuba suit and goes underwater to check the boat's hull and finds a large shark tooth embedded into it. He drops the tooth after encountering Gardner's severed head. Vaughn dismisses Brody and Hooper's assertions that a great white shark caused the deaths and refuses to close the beaches, allowing only increased safety precautions. On the Fourth of July weekend, tourists pack the beaches. The shark enters a nearby lagoon, killing a boater and nearly killing Brody's son, Michael, who is hospitalized with shock. Brody then convinces a guilt-ridden Vaughn to hire Quint.

Despite initial tension between Quint and Hooper, and Brody's fear of the ocean, the three head out to sea on Quint's boat, the Orca, to hunt for the shark. As Brody lays down a chum line, the shark suddenly appears behind the boat. Quint, estimating it is 25 feet (7.6 m) long and weighs 3 tonnes (3.0 long tons; 3.3 short tons), harpoons it with a line attached to a flotation barrel, but the shark pulls it underwater and disappears.

At nightfall, Quint and Hooper drunkenly exchange stories about their assorted body scars. One of Quint's is a removed tattoo; he reveals that during World War II, he survived the sinking of the USS Indianapolis, during which sharks killed many U.S. sailors. The shark returns, ramming the boat's hull and disabling the power. The men work through the night, repairing the engine. In the morning, Brody attempts to call the Coast Guard, but Quint, obsessed with killing the shark without outside assistance, smashes the radio. After a long chase, Quint harpoons the shark with another barrel. The line is tied to the stern cleats, but the shark drags the boat backward, swamping the deck and flooding the engine compartment. As Quint is about to sever the line to save the boat's transom, the cleats break off; the barrels stay attached to the shark. To Brody's relief, Quint speeds the Orca toward shore to draw the shark into shallower waters, but the damaged engine fails.

As the boat takes on water, the trio attempt a riskier approach. Hooper suits up and enters a shark-proof cage, intending to lethally inject the shark with strychnine via a hypodermic spear. The shark attacks the cage, causing Hooper to drop the spear. While the shark destroys the cage, Hooper escapes to the ocean bottom. The shark leaps onto the boat's stern, subsequently devouring Quint. Trapped on the sinking vessel, Brody thrusts a scuba tank into the shark's mouth and climbing onto the crow's nest shoots the tank with a rifle. The resulting explosion kills the shark. Hooper resurfaces, and he and Brody paddle back to shore, clinging to the remaining barrels.

== Production ==
=== Development ===
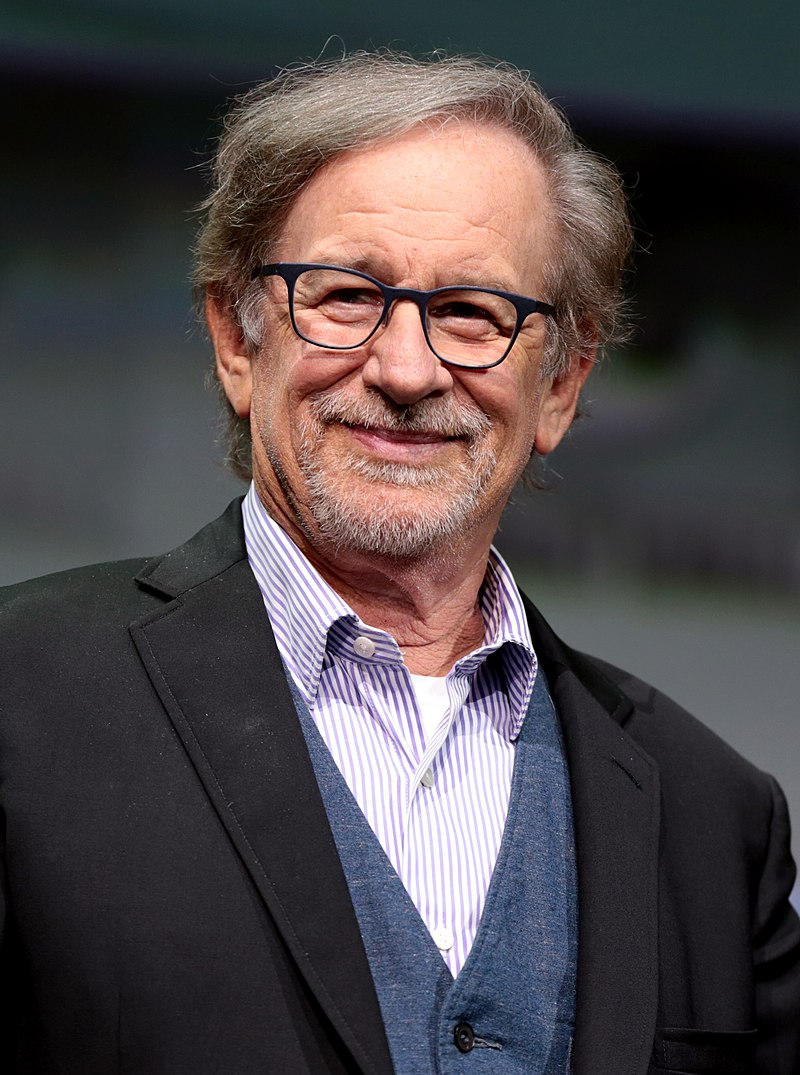
Director Steven Spielberg in 2018

Richard D. Zanuck and David Brown, producers at Universal Pictures, independently heard about Peter Benchley's novel Jaws. Brown came across it in the literature section of lifestyle magazine Cosmopolitan, which at that time was edited by his wife, Helen Gurley Brown. A small card written by the magazine's book editor gave a detailed description of the plot, concluding with the comment "might make a good movie". The producers each read the book over the course of a single night and agreed the next morning that it was "the most exciting thing that they had ever read" and that they wanted to produce a film version, although they were unsure how it would be accomplished. They purchased the film rights in 1973, before the book's publication, for approximately $175,000 (equivalent to $1,270,000 in 2025). Brown claimed that had they read the book twice, they would never have made the film because they would have realized how difficult it would be to execute certain sequences.

To direct, Zanuck and Brown first considered veteran filmmaker John Sturges—whose résumé included another maritime adventure, The Old Man and the Sea—before offering the job to Dick Richards, whose directorial debut, The Culpepper Cattle Co., had come out the previous year. They soon grew irritated by Richards's habit of describing the shark as a whale and dropped him from the project. Meanwhile, Steven Spielberg very much wanted the job. The 26-year-old had just directed his first theatrical film, The Sugarland Express, for Zanuck and Brown. At the end of a meeting in their office, Spielberg noticed their copy of the still-unpublished Benchley novel, and after reading it was immediately captivated. He later observed that it was similar to his 1971 television film Duel in that both deal with "these leviathans targeting everymen". He also revealed in "The Making of Jaws" documentary on the 2012 DVD release that he directly referenced Duel by repurposing the sound of the truck being destroyed as the death roar of the shark. After Richards's departure, the producers signed Spielberg to direct in June 1973, before the release of The Sugarland Express.

Before production began, Spielberg grew reluctant to continue with Jaws in fear of becoming typecast as the "truck and shark director". He wanted to move over to 20th Century Fox's Lucky Lady instead, but Universal exercised its right under its contract with the director to veto his departure. Brown helped convince Spielberg to stick with the project, saying that "after [Jaws], you can make all the films you want". The film was given an estimated budget of $3.5 million and a shooting schedule of 55 days. Principal photography was set to begin in May 1974. Universal wanted the shoot to finish by the end of June, when the major studios' contract with the Screen Actors Guild was due to expire, to avoid any disruptions due to a potential strike.

=== Writing ===
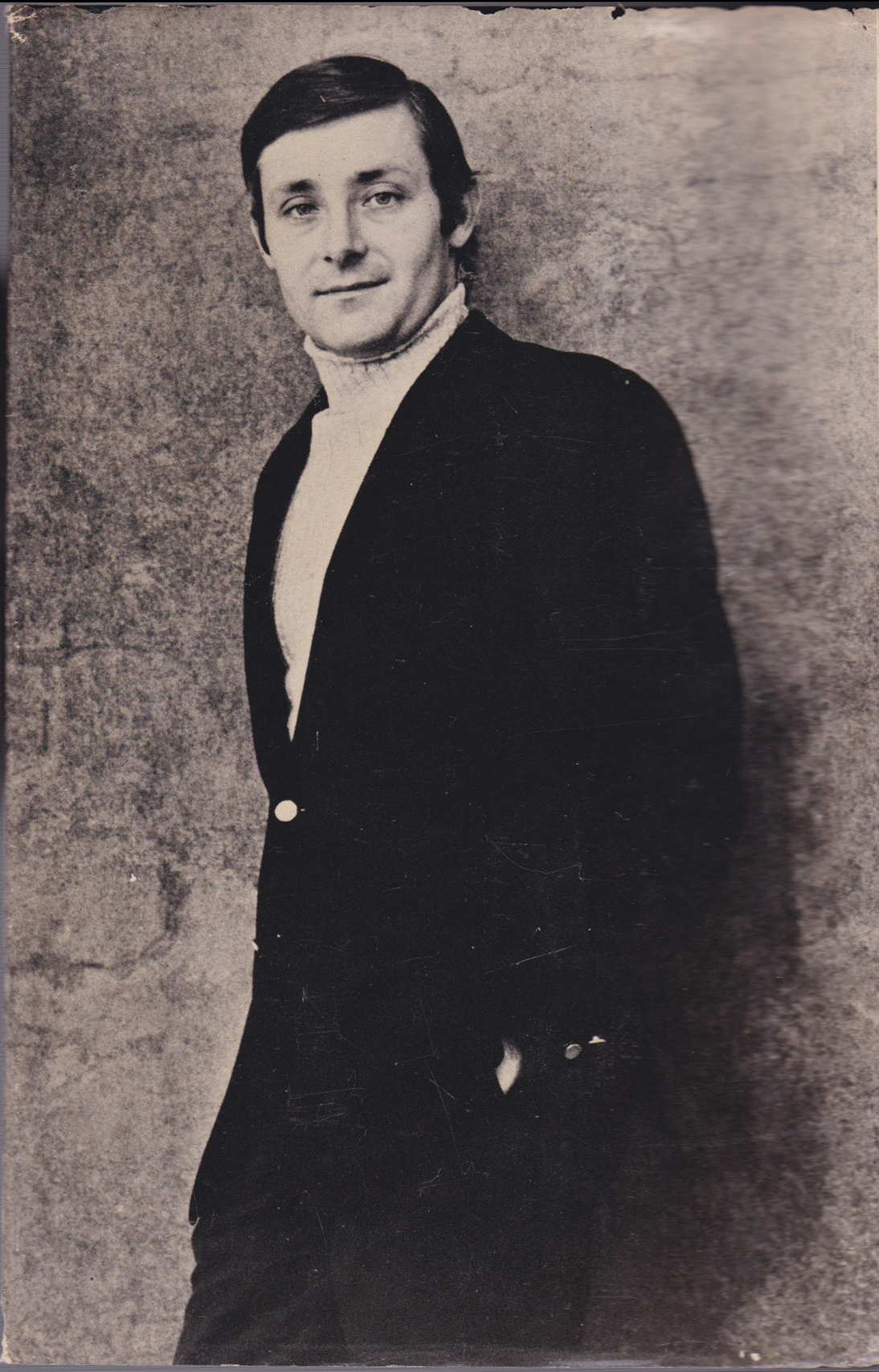
The first three drafts of the screenplay for Jaws were written by Peter Benchley (pictured in 1974), the author of the original novel.

For the screen adaptation, Spielberg wanted to stay with the novel's basic plot but discarded Benchley's subplots. He declared that his favorite part of the book was the shark hunt on the last 120 pages and told Zanuck when he accepted the job, "I'd like to do the picture if I could change the first two acts and base the first two acts on original screenplay material, and then be very true to the book for the last third." When the producers purchased the rights to his novel, they promised Benchley that he could write the first draft of the screenplay. The intent was to make sure a script could be completed despite an impending threat of a Writer's Guild strike, given Benchley was not unionized. Benchley wrote three drafts before the script was turned over to other writers; delivering his final version to Spielberg, he declared, "I'm written out on this, and that's the best I can do." Benchley later described his contribution to the finished film as "the storyline and the ocean stuff—basically, the mechanics", given he "didn't know how to put the character texture into a screenplay." One of the changes was to remove the novel's adulterous affair between Ellen Brody and Matt Hooper at the suggestion of Spielberg, who feared it would compromise the camaraderie between the men on the Orca. During the film's production, Benchley agreed to play a small onscreen role as a reporter.

Spielberg, who felt that the characters in Benchley's script were still unlikable, invited the young screenwriter John Byrum to do a rewrite, but Byrum declined the offer. Columbo creators William Link and Richard Levinson also declined Spielberg's invitation. Tony and Pulitzer Prize-winning playwright Howard Sackler was in Los Angeles when the filmmakers began looking for another writer and offered to do an uncredited rewrite; since the producers and Spielberg were unhappy with Benchley's drafts, they quickly agreed. At the suggestion of Spielberg, Brody's characterization made him afraid of water, "coming from an urban jungle to find something more terrifying off this placid island near Massachusetts."

Spielberg wanted "some levity" in Jaws, humor that would avoid making it "a dark sea hunt", so he turned to his friend Carl Gottlieb, a comedy writer-actor then working on the sitcom The Odd Couple. Spielberg sent Gottlieb a script, asking what the writer would change and if there was a role he would be interested in performing. Gottlieb sent Spielberg three pages of notes and picked the part of Harry Meadows, the politically connected editor of Amity's newspaper. He passed the audition one week before Spielberg took him to meet the producers regarding a writing job.

While the deal was initially for a "one-week dialogue polish", Gottlieb eventually became the primary screenwriter, rewriting nearly the entire script during a nine-week period of principal photography. The script for each scene was typically finished the night before it was shot, after Gottlieb had dinner with Spielberg and members of the cast and crew to decide what would go into the film. Many pieces of dialogue originated from the actors' improvisations during these meals; a few were created on set just prior to filming. John Milius contributed other dialogue polishes, and Sugarland Express writers Matthew Robbins and Hal Barwood also made uncredited contributions. Spielberg has claimed that he prepared his own draft, although it is unclear to what degree the other screenwriters drew on his material. One specific alteration he called for in the story was to change the cause of the shark's death from extensive wounds to a scuba tank explosion, as he felt audiences would respond better to a "big rousing ending". The director estimated the final script had a total of 27 scenes that were not in the book.

Benchley had written Jaws after reading about sport fisherman Frank Mundus's capture of an enormous shark in 1964. According to Gottlieb, Quint was loosely based on Mundus, whose book Sportfishing for Sharks he read for research. Sackler came up with the backstory of Quint as a survivor of the World War II USS Indianapolis disaster. The question of who deserves the most credit for writing Quint's monologue about the Indianapolis has caused substantial controversy. Spielberg described it as a collaboration between Sackler, Milius, and actor Robert Shaw, who was also a playwright. According to the director, Milius turned Sackler's "three-quarters of a page" speech into a monologue, and that was then partially rewritten by Shaw. Gottlieb gives primary credit to Shaw, downplaying Milius's contribution.

=== Casting ===
Actor	Role
Roy Scheider	Chief Martin Brody
Robert Shaw	Quint
Richard Dreyfuss	Matt Hooper
Lorraine Gary	Ellen Brody
Murray Hamilton	Mayor Larry Vaughn
Carl Gottlieb	Meadows
Jeffrey Kramer	Deputy Leonard Hendricks
Susan Backlinie	Chrissie Watkins
Lee Fierro	Mrs. Kintner
Peter Benchley	Interviewer

Though Spielberg complied with a request from Zanuck and Brown to cast known actors and Benchley suggesting Robert Redford, Paul Newman and Steve McQueen for the leads, he wanted to avoid hiring any big stars. He felt that "somewhat anonymous" performers would help the audience "believe this was happening to people like you and me", whereas "stars bring a lot of memories along with them, and those memories can sometimes ... corrupt the story." The director added that in his plans "the superstar was gonna be the shark". The first actors cast were Lorraine Gary, the wife of Universal president, Sidney Sheinberg, as Ellen Brody, and Murray Hamilton as the mayor of Amity Island. Stuntwoman-turned-actress Susan Backlinie was cast as Chrissie Watkins (the first victim) as she knew how to swim and was willing to perform nude. Most minor roles were played by residents of Martha's Vineyard, where the film was shot. One example was Deputy Hendricks, played by future television producer Jeffrey Kramer. Lee Fierro plays Mrs. Kintner, the mother of the shark's second victim Alex Kintner (played by Jeffrey Voorhees).

The role of Brody was offered to Robert Duvall, but the actor was interested only in portraying Quint (which he was deemed too young for). Charlton Heston expressed a desire for the role but Spielberg turned him down as he felt that Heston would bring a screen persona too grand for the part of a police chief of a modest community. Roy Scheider became interested in the project after overhearing Spielberg at a party talk with a screenwriter about having the shark jump up onto a boat. Spielberg was apprehensive about hiring Scheider, fearing he would portray a "tough guy", similar to his role in The French Connection.

Nine days before the start of production, neither Quint nor Hooper had been cast. The role of Quint was originally offered to actors Lee Marvin and Sterling Hayden, both of whom passed. Zanuck and Brown had just finished working with Robert Shaw on The Sting, and suggested him to Spielberg. Shaw was reluctant to take the role since he did not like the book but decided to accept at the urging of both his wife (actress Mary Ure) and his secretary: "The last time they were that enthusiastic was From Russia with Love. And they were right". Shaw based his performance on fellow cast member Craig Kingsbury, a local fisherman, farmer and legendary eccentric, who was cast in the small role of fisherman Ben Gardner. Spielberg described Kingsbury as "the purest version of who, in my mind, Quint was" and some of his offscreen utterances were incorporated into the script as lines of both Gardner and Quint. Another source for some of Quint's dialogue and mannerisms, especially in the third act at sea, was Vineyard mechanic and boat-owner Lynn Murphy.

For the role of Hooper, Spielberg's first choice was Jon Voight; but Voight passed as he wasn't interested. Timothy Bottoms, Jan-Michael Vincent, Joel Grey, Kevin Kline, and Jeff Bridges were also considered for the part. Spielberg's friend George Lucas suggested Richard Dreyfuss, whom he had directed in American Graffiti. The actor initially passed but changed his decision after he attended a pre-release screening of The Apprenticeship of Duddy Kravitz, which he had just completed. Disappointed in his performance and fearing that no one would want to hire him once Kravitz was released, he immediately called Spielberg and accepted the role in Jaws. Because the film the director envisioned was so dissimilar to Benchley's novel, Spielberg asked Dreyfuss not to read it. As a result of the casting, Hooper was rewritten to better suit the actor, as well as to be more representative of Spielberg, who came to view Dreyfuss as his "alter ego".

=== Filming ===
We started the film without a script, without a cast and without a shark.

— Actor Richard Dreyfuss on the film's troubled production

Principal photography began on May 2, 1974, on the island of Martha's Vineyard, Massachusetts, selected after consideration was given to eastern Long Island. Brown explained later that the production "needed a vacation area that was lower middle class enough so that an appearance of a shark would destroy the tourist business." Martha's Vineyard was also chosen because the surrounding ocean had a sandy bottom that never dropped below 35 feet (11 m) for 12 miles (19 km) out from shore, which allowed the mechanical sharks to operate while also beyond sight of land. As Spielberg wanted to film the aquatic sequences relatively close-up to resemble what people see while swimming, cinematographer Bill Butler devised new equipment to facilitate marine and underwater shooting, including a rig to keep the camera stable, regardless of tide, and a sealed submersible camera box. Spielberg asked the art department to avoid red in both scenery and wardrobe, so that the blood from the attacks would be the only red element and cause a bigger shock.

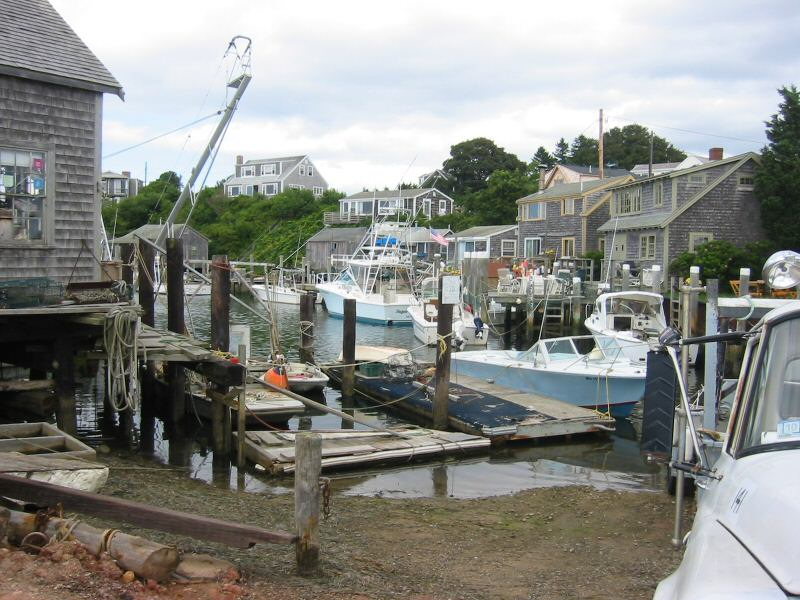
The fishing village of Menemsha, Martha's Vineyard, was the primary location.

Initially the film's producers wanted to train a great white shark but quickly realized this was not possible, so three full-size pneumatically powered prop sharks—which the film crew nicknamed "Bruce" after Spielberg's lawyer, Bruce Ramer—were made for the production: a "sea-sled shark", a full-body prop with its belly missing that was towed with a 300-foot (91 m) line, and two "platform sharks", one that moved from camera-left to right (with its hidden left side exposing an array of pneumatic hoses), and an opposite model with its right flank uncovered. The sharks were designed by art director and production designer Joe Alves during the third quarter of 1973. Between November 1973 and April 1974, the sharks were fabricated at Rolly Harper's Motion Picture & Equipment Rental in Sun Valley, California. Their construction involved a team of as many as 40 effects technicians, supervised by mechanical effects supervisor Bob Mattey, best known for creating the giant squid in 20,000 Leagues Under the Sea. After the sharks were completed, they were trucked to the shooting location. In early July, the platform used to tow the two side-view sharks capsized as it was being lowered to the ocean floor, forcing a team of divers to retrieve it. The model required 14 operators to control all of the moving parts. The two shark models had different sets of plastic teeth, one was hard and the other was soft, the latter made it easier for the stuntman to be inside of the platform of the shark. For Quint's boat, the Orca, Alves and his team constructed two identical 42-foot models for the film. The second boat, dubbed Orca II, had no motor and was designed to sink on command.

Jaws was the first major motion picture to be shot on the ocean, resulting in a troubled shoot, and went far over budget. David Brown said that the budget "was $4 million and the picture wound up costing $9 million"; the effects outlays alone grew to $3 million due to the problems with the mechanical sharks. Disgruntled crew members gave the film the nickname "Flaws". Spielberg attributed many problems to his perfectionism and his inexperience. The former was epitomized by his insistence on shooting at sea with a life-sized shark; "I could have shot the movie in the tank or even in a protected lake somewhere, but it would not have looked the same," he said. As for his lack of experience: "I was naive about the ocean, basically. I was pretty naive about mother nature and the hubris of a filmmaker who thinks he can conquer the elements was foolhardy, but I was too young to know I was being foolhardy when I demanded that we shoot the film in the Atlantic Ocean and not in a North Hollywood tank." Gottlieb said that "there was nothing to do except make the movie", so everyone kept overworking, and while as a writer he did not have to attend the ocean set every day, once the crewmen returned they arrived "ravaged and sunburnt, windblown and covered with salt water".

Shooting at sea led to many delays: unwanted sailboats drifted into frame, cameras got soaked, and the Orca once began to sink with the actors on board. The prop sharks frequently malfunctioned owing to a series of problems including bad weather, pneumatic hoses taking on salt water, frames fracturing due to water resistance, corroding skin, and electrolysis. From the first water test onward, the "non-absorbent" neoprene foam that made up the sharks' skin soaked up liquid, causing the sharks to balloon, and the sea-sled model frequently got entangled among forests of seaweed. Spielberg later calculated that during the 12-hour daily work schedule, on average only four hours were actually spent filming. Gottlieb was nearly decapitated by the boat's propellers, and Dreyfuss was almost imprisoned in the steel cage. The actors were frequently seasick. Shaw also fled to Canada whenever he could due to tax problems, engaged in binge drinking, and developed a grudge against Dreyfuss, who was getting rave reviews for his performance in Duddy Kravitz. Editor Verna Fields rarely had material to work with during principal photography, as according to Spielberg "we would shoot five scenes in a good day, three in an average day, and none in a bad day."

The mechanical shark, attached to the tower

The delays proved beneficial in some regards. The script was refined during production, and the unreliable mechanical sharks forced Spielberg to shoot many scenes so that the shark was only hinted at. For example, for much of the shark hunt, its location is indicated by the floating yellow barrels. The opening had the shark devouring Chrissie, but it was rewritten so that it would be shot with Backlinie being dragged and yanked by cables to simulate an attack. Spielberg also included multiple shots of just the dorsal fin. This forced restraint is widely thought to have added to the film's suspense. As Spielberg put it years later, "The film went from a Japanese Saturday matinee horror flick to more of a Hitchcock, the less-you-see-the-more-you-get thriller." In another interview, he similarly declared, "The shark not working was a godsend. It made me become more like Alfred Hitchcock than like Ray Harryhausen." The acting became crucial for making audiences believe in such a big shark: "The more fake the shark looked in the water, the more my anxiety told me to heighten the naturalism of the performances."

Footage of real sharks was shot by Ron and Valerie Taylor in the waters off Dangerous Reef in South Australia, with a short actor in a miniature shark cage to create the illusion that the sharks were enormous. During the Taylors' shoot, a great white attacked the boat and cage. The footage of the cage attack was so stunning that Spielberg was eager to incorporate it in the film. No one had been in the cage at the time and the script, following the novel, originally had the shark killing Hooper in it. The storyline was consequently altered to have Hooper escape from the cage, which allowed the footage to be used. As production executive Bill Gilmore put it, "The shark down in Australia rewrote the script and saved Dreyfuss's character."

Although principal photography was scheduled to take 55 days, it did not wrap until October 6, 1974, after 159 days. Spielberg, reflecting on the protracted shoot, stated, "I thought my career as a filmmaker was over. I heard rumors ... that I would never work again because no one had ever taken a film 100 days over schedule." Spielberg was offered, several times, to bow out from the film to shut down production. Spielberg himself was not present for the shooting of the final scene in which the shark explodes, as he believed that the crew were planning to throw him in the water when the scene was done. It has since become a tradition for Spielberg to be absent when the final scene of one of his films is being shot. Afterward, underwater scenes were shot at the Metro-Goldwyn-Mayer Studios water tank in Culver City, with stuntmen Dick Warlock and Frank James Sparks as stand-ins for Dreyfuss in the scene where the shark attacks the cage, as well as near Santa Catalina Island, California. Fields, who had completed a rough cut of the first two-thirds of the film, up until the shark hunt, finished the editing and reworked some of the material. According to Zanuck, "She actually came in and reconstructed some scenes that Steven had constructed for comedy and made them terrifying, and some scenes he shot to be terrifying and made them comedy scenes." The boat used for the Orca was brought to Los Angeles so the sound effects team could record sounds for both the ship and the underwater scenes.

Two scenes were altered following test screenings. As the audience's screams had covered up Scheider's "bigger boat" one-liner, Brody's reaction after the shark jumps behind him was extended, and the volume of the line was raised. Spielberg also decided that he was greedy for "one more scream", and reshot the scene in which Hooper discovers Ben Gardner's body, using $3,000 of his own money after Universal refused to pay for the reshoot. The underwater scene was shot in Fields's swimming pool in Encino, California, using a lifecast latex model of Craig Kingsbury's head attached to a fake body, which was placed in the wrecked boat's hull. To simulate the murky waters of Martha's Vineyard, powdered milk was poured into the pool, which was then covered with a tarpaulin.

== Music ==
"Main Title and First Victim"
The main theme for Jaws, revolving around an ostinato of bass notes, which composer John Williams said were meant to represent the shark as an "unstoppable force" of "mindless and instinctive attacks"

John Williams composed the film's score, which earned him an Academy Award and was later ranked the sixth-greatest score by the American Film Institute. The main "shark" theme, a simple alternating pattern of two notes—variously identified as "E and F" or "F and F sharp"—became a classic piece of suspense music, synonymous with approaching danger (see leading-tone). Williams described the theme as "grinding away at you, just as a shark would do, instinctual, relentless, unstoppable." The piece was performed by tuba player Tommy Johnson. When asked by Johnson why the melody was written in such a high register and not played by the more appropriate French horn, Williams responded that he wanted it to sound "a little more threatening". When Williams first demonstrated his idea to Spielberg, playing just the two notes on a piano, Spielberg was said to have laughed, thinking that it was a joke. As Williams saw similarities between Jaws and pirate movies, at other points in the score he evoked "pirate music", which he called "primal, but fun and entertaining". Calling for rapid, percussive string playing, the score contains echoes of Claude Debussy's La mer and of Igor Stravinsky's The Rite of Spring.

There are various interpretations of the meaning and effectiveness of the primary music theme, which is widely described as one of the most recognizable cinematic themes of all time. Music scholar Joseph Cancellaro proposes that the two-note expression mimics the shark's heartbeat. According to Alexandre Tylski, like themes Bernard Herrmann wrote for Taxi Driver, North by Northwest, and particularly Mysterious Island, it suggests human respiration. He further argues that the score's strongest motif is actually "the split, the rupture"—when it dramatically cuts off, as after Chrissie's death. The relationship between sound and silence is also taken advantage of in the way the audience is conditioned to associate the shark with its theme, which is exploited toward the film's climax when the shark suddenly appears with no musical introduction.

Spielberg later said that without Williams's score the film would have been only half as successful, and according to Williams it jumpstarted his career. He had previously scored Spielberg's debut feature, The Sugarland Express, and went on to collaborate with the director on almost all of his films. The original soundtrack for Jaws was released by MCA Records on LP in 1975, and as a CD in 1992, including roughly a half hour of music that Williams redid for the album. In 2000, two versions of the score were released: Decca/Universal reissued the soundtrack album to coincide with the release of the 25th-anniversary DVD, featuring the entire 51 minutes of the original score, and Varèse Sarabande put out a rerecording of the score performed by the Royal Scottish National Orchestra, conducted by Joel McNeely.

== Themes ==
=== Influences ===
Herman Melville's Moby-Dick is the most notable artistic antecedent to Jaws. The character of Quint strongly resembles Captain Ahab, the obsessed captain of the Pequod who devotes his life to hunting a sperm whale. Quint's monologue reveals a similar obsession with sharks; even his boat, the Orca, is named after the only natural enemy of the white shark. In the novel and original screenplay, Quint dies after being dragged under the ocean by a harpoon tied to his leg, similar to the death of Ahab in Melville's novel. A direct reference to these similarities may be found in Spielberg's draft of the screenplay, which introduces Quint watching the film version of Moby-Dick; his continuous laughter prompts other audience members to get up and leave the theater. However, the scene from Moby-Dick could not be licensed from the film's star, Gregory Peck, its copyright holder. Screenwriter Carl Gottlieb also drew comparisons to Ernest Hemingway's The Old Man and the Sea: "Jaws is ... a titanic struggle, like Melville or Hemingway."

The underwater scenes shot from the shark's point of view have been compared with passages in two 1950s horror films, Creature from the Black Lagoon and The Monster That Challenged the World. Gottlieb named two science fiction productions from the same era as influences on how the shark was depicted, or not: The Thing from Another World, which Gottlieb described as "a great horror film where you only see the monster in the last reel"; and It Came From Outer Space, where "the suspense was built up because the creature was always off-camera". Those precedents helped Spielberg and Gottlieb to "concentrate on showing the 'effects' of the shark rather than the shark itself". Scholars such as Thomas Schatz have described how Jaws melds various genres while essentially being an action film and a thriller. Most is taken from horror, with the core of a nature-based monster movie while adding elements of a slasher film. The second half is both a buddy film in the interaction between the crew of the Orca, and a supernatural horror based on the shark's depiction of a nearly Satanic menace. Ian Freer describes Jaws as an aquatic monster movie, citing the influence of earlier monster films such as King Kong and Godzilla. Charles Derry, in 1977, also compared Jaws to Godzilla; and Spielberg cited Godzilla, King of the Monsters! (1956) as a formative influence growing up, due to the "masterful" way in which "it made you believe it was really happening."

Critics such as Neil Sinyard have described similarities to Henrik Ibsen's play An Enemy of the People. Gottlieb himself said he and Spielberg referred to Jaws as "Moby-Dick meets Enemy of the People". The Ibsen work features a doctor who discovers that a seaside town's medicinal hot springs, a major tourist attraction and revenue source, are contaminated. When the doctor attempts to convince the townspeople of the danger, he loses his job and is shunned. This plotline is paralleled in Jaws by Brody's conflict with Mayor Vaughn, who refuses to acknowledge the presence of a shark that may dissuade summer beachgoers from coming to Amity. Brody is vindicated when more shark attacks occur at the crowded beach in broad daylight. Sinyard calls the film a "deft combination of Watergate and Ibsen's play".

=== Scholarly criticism ===
Jaws has received attention from academic critics. Stephen Heath relates the film's ideological meanings to the then-recent Watergate scandal. He argues that Brody represents the "white male middle class—[there is] not a single black and, very quickly, not a single woman in the film", who restores public order "with an ordinary-guy kind of heroism born of fear-and-decency". Yet Heath moves beyond ideological content analysis to examine Jaws as a signal example of the film as "industrial product" that sells on the basis of "the pleasure of cinema, thus yielding the perpetuation of the industry (which is why part of the meaning of Jaws is to be the most profitable movie)".

Andrew Britton contrasts the film to the novel's post-Watergate cynicism, suggesting that its narrative alterations from the book (Hooper's survival, the shark's explosive death) help make it "a communal exorcism, a ceremony for the restoration of ideological confidence." He suggests that the experience of the film is "inconceivable" without the mass audience's jubilation when the shark is annihilated, signifying the obliteration of evil itself. In his view, Brody serves to demonstrate that "individual action by the one just man is still a viable source for social change". Peter Biskind argues that the film does maintain post-Watergate cynicism concerning politics and politicians insofar as the sole villain beside the shark is the town's venal mayor. Yet he observes that, far from the narrative formulas so often employed by New Hollywood filmmakers of the era—involving Us vs. Them, hip counterculture figures vs. "The Man"—the overarching conflict in Jaws does not pit the heroes against authority figures, but against a menace that targets everyone regardless of socioeconomic position.

Whereas Britton states that the film avoids the novel's theme of social class conflicts on Amity Island, Biskind detects class divisions in the screen version and argues for their significance. "Authority must be restored", he writes, "but not by Quint". The seaman's "working class toughness and bourgeois independence is alien and frightening ... irrational and out of control". Hooper, meanwhile, is "associated with technology rather than experience, inherited wealth rather than self-made sufficiency"; he is marginalized from the conclusive action, if less terminally than Quint. Britton sees the film more as concerned with the "vulnerability of children and the need to protect and guard them", which in turn helps generate a "pervasive sense of the supreme value of family life: a value clearly related to [ideological] stability and cultural continuity".

Fredric Jameson's analysis highlights the polysemy of the shark and the multiple ways in which it can be and has been read—from representing alien menaces such as communism or the Third World to more intimate dreads concerning the unreality of contemporary American life and the vain efforts to sanitize and suppress the knowledge of death. He asserts that its symbolic function is to be found in this very "polysemousness which is profoundly ideological, insofar as it allows essentially social and historical anxieties to be folded back into apparently 'natural' ones ... to be recontained in what looks like a conflict with other forms of biological existence." He views Quint's demise as the symbolic overthrow of an old, populist, New Deal America and Brody and Hooper's partnership as an "allegory of an alliance between the forces of law-and-order and the new technocracy of the multinational corporations ... in which the viewer rejoices without understanding that he or she is excluded from it."

Neal Gabler analyzed the film as showing three different approaches to solving an obstacle: science (represented by Hooper), spiritualism (represented by Quint), and the common man (represented by Brody). The last of the three is the one which succeeds and is in that way endorsed by the film.

=== Audience emotional response ===
A Gallup poll in September 1975 reported that 18 percent of respondents said it was the most frightening movie they'd ever seen, and 35 percent said that the film increased their fear of swimming in the ocean. While in theaters, the film was said to have caused a single case of cinematic neurosis in a 17-year-old female viewer. Cinematic neurosis is a condition in which viewers exhibit mental health disturbances, or a worsening of existing mental health disturbances, after viewing a film. The symptoms first presented as sleep disturbances and anxiety, but one day later the patient was screaming "Sharks! Sharks!" and experiencing convulsions.

This case study caused the film to become notable in the medical community alongside The Exorcist for causing stress reactions in its viewers, and was later used in a study by Brian R. Johnson to test how susceptible audiences were to cinematic stress inducers. His study found that stress could be induced by cinema in segments of the general population, and Jaws specifically caused stress reactions in its viewers. While Johnson could not find an exact cause for the stress response in viewers, whether it be the suspense, the gore or the music production, a 1986 study by G. Sparks found that particularly violent films, including Jaws, tended to cause the most intense reactions in viewers.

== Release ==
=== Marketing ===
Universal spent $1.8 million marketing Jaws, including an unprecedented $700,000 on national television spot advertising. The media blitz included about two dozen 30-second advertisements airing each night on prime-time network TV between June 18, 1975, and the film's opening two days later. Beyond that, in the description of film industry scholar Searle Kochberg, Universal "devised and co-ordinated a highly innovative plan" for the picture's marketing. As early as October 1974, Zanuck, Brown, and Benchley hit the television and radio talk show circuit to promote the paperback edition of the novel and the forthcoming film. The studio and publisher Bantam agreed on a title logo that would appear on both the paperback and in all of the advertising for the film. The centerpieces of the joint marketing strategy were John Williams's theme and the poster image featuring the shark approaching a lone female swimmer. The poster was based on the paperback's cover, and had the same artist, Bantam employee Roger Kastel. The Seiniger Advertising agency spent six months designing the poster; principal Tony Seiniger explained that "no matter what we did, it didn't look scary enough". Seiniger ultimately decided that "you had to actually go underneath the shark so you could see his teeth."

More merchandise was created to take advantage of the film's release. In 1999, Graeme Turner wrote that Jaws was accompanied by what was "probably the most elaborate array of tie-ins" including "a sound-track album, T-shirts, plastic tumblers, a book about the making of the movie, the book the movie was based on, beach towels, blankets, shark costumes, toy sharks, hobby kits, iron-on transfers, games, posters, shark's tooth necklaces, sleepwear, water pistols, and more." The Ideal Toy Company, for instance, produced The Game of Jaws in which the player had to use a hook to fish out items from the shark's mouth before the jaws closed.

=== Theatrical run ===
The glowing audience response to a rough cut of the film at two test screenings in Dallas on March 26, 1975, and one in Long Beach, on March 28, along with the success of Benchley's novel and the early stages of Universal's marketing campaign, generated great interest among theater owners, facilitating the studio's plan to debut Jaws at hundreds of cinemas simultaneously. A third and final preview screening, of a cut incorporating changes inspired by the previous presentations, was held in Hollywood on April 24. After Universal chairman Lew Wasserman attended one of the screenings, he ordered the film's initial release—planned for a massive total of as many as 900 theaters—to be cut down, declaring, "I want this picture to run all summer long. I don't want people in Palm Springs to see the picture in Palm Springs. I want them to have to get in their cars and drive to see it in Hollywood." Nonetheless, the several hundred theaters that were still booked for the opening represented what was then an unusually wide release. At the time, wide openings were associated with movies of doubtful quality; not uncommon on the exploitation side of the industry, they were customarily employed to diminish the effect of negative reviews and word of mouth. There had been some recent exceptions, including the rerelease of Billy Jack and the original release of its sequel The Trial of Billy Jack, the Dirty Harry sequel Magnum Force, and the latest installments in the James Bond series. Still, the typical major studio film release at the time involved opening at a few big-city theaters, which allowed for a series of premieres. Distributors would then slowly forward prints to additional locales across the country, capitalizing on any positive critical or audience response. The outsized success of The Godfather in 1972 had sparked a trend toward wider releases, but even that film had debuted in just five theaters, before going wide in its second weekend.

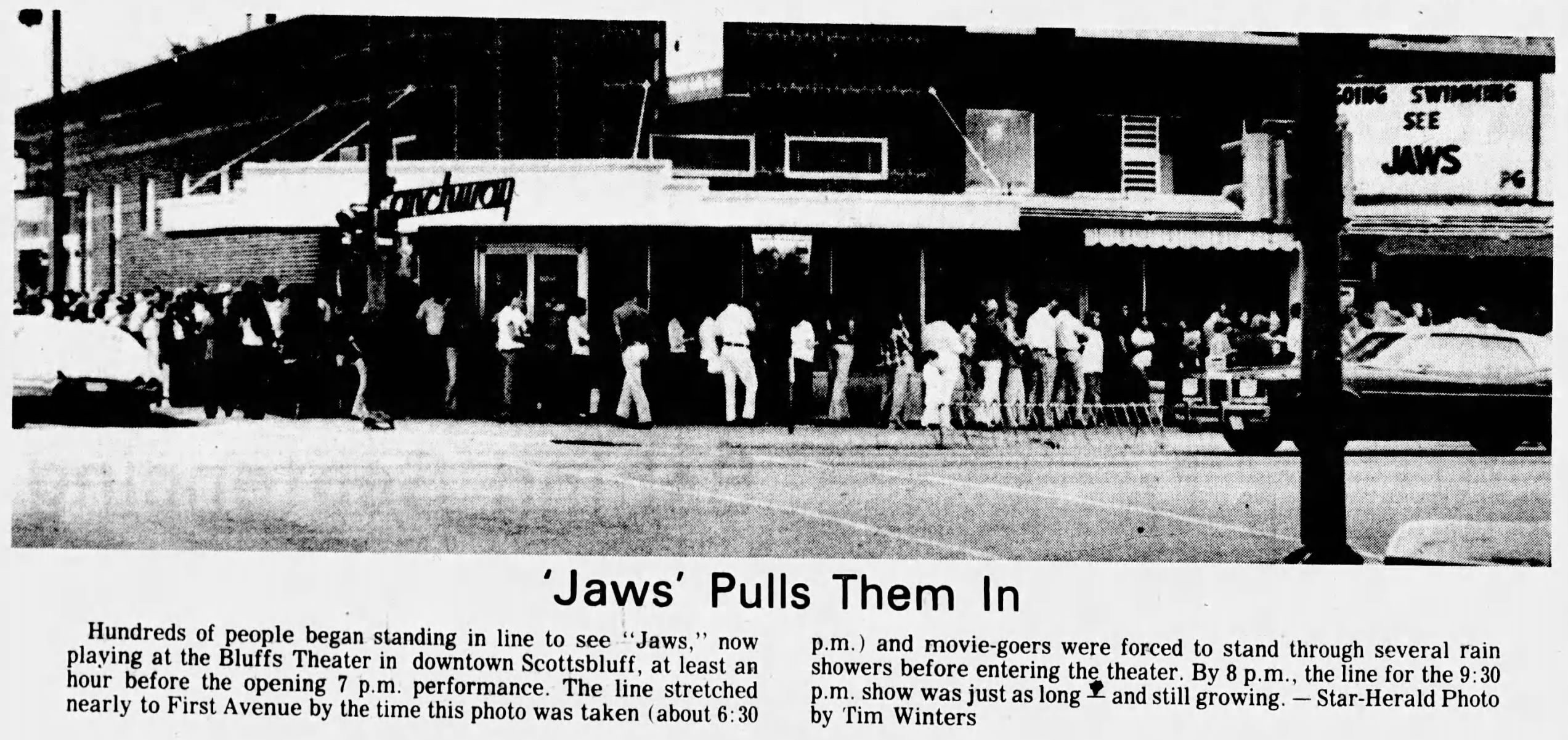
Newspaper clipping from August 1975

On June 20, Jaws opened across North America on 464 screens—409 in the United States, the remainder in Canada. The coupling of this broad distribution pattern with the movie's then even rarer national television marketing campaign yielded a release method virtually unheard of at the time. (A month earlier, Columbia Pictures had done something similar with a Charles Bronson thriller, Breakout, though that film's prospects for an extended run were much slimmer, and it is today a common misconception that Jaws was the first to use an ad saturation strategy.) Universal president Sid Sheinberg reasoned that nationwide marketing costs would be amortized at a more favorable rate per print relative to a slow, scaled release. Building on the film's success, the release was subsequently expanded on July 25 to nearly 700 theaters, and on August 15 to more than 950. Overseas distribution followed the same pattern, with intensive television campaigns and wide releases—in Great Britain, for instance, Jaws opened in December at more than 100 theaters.

=== Later runs ===
For its 40th anniversary, the film was released in selected theaters (across approximately 500 theaters) in the United States on Sunday, June 21, and Wednesday, June 24, 2015.

Another theatrical reissue was released on September 2, 2022, usually under the title Jaws in 3D (not to be confused with the second sequel, Jaws 3-D) with the film debuting in both IMAX and RealD 3D formats, as part of the 40th anniversary celebration of another Spielberg film E.T. the Extra-Terrestrial. On the announcement, Travis Reed of RealD 3D remarked: "Jaws redefined what it means to be a summer-event blockbuster and now for the first time ever audiences can experience Steven Spielberg's motion picture classic in 3D ... allowing fans a completely new opportunity to immerse themselves in one of the greatest summer suspense thrillers of all time."

For the film's 50th anniversary, the 2025 TCM Classic Film Festival held a special screening, followed by a limited theatrical re-release from August 29 to September 4, 2025, alongside a celebratory exhibition at the Academy Museum of Motion Pictures in Los Angeles.

== Reception ==
=== Box office ===
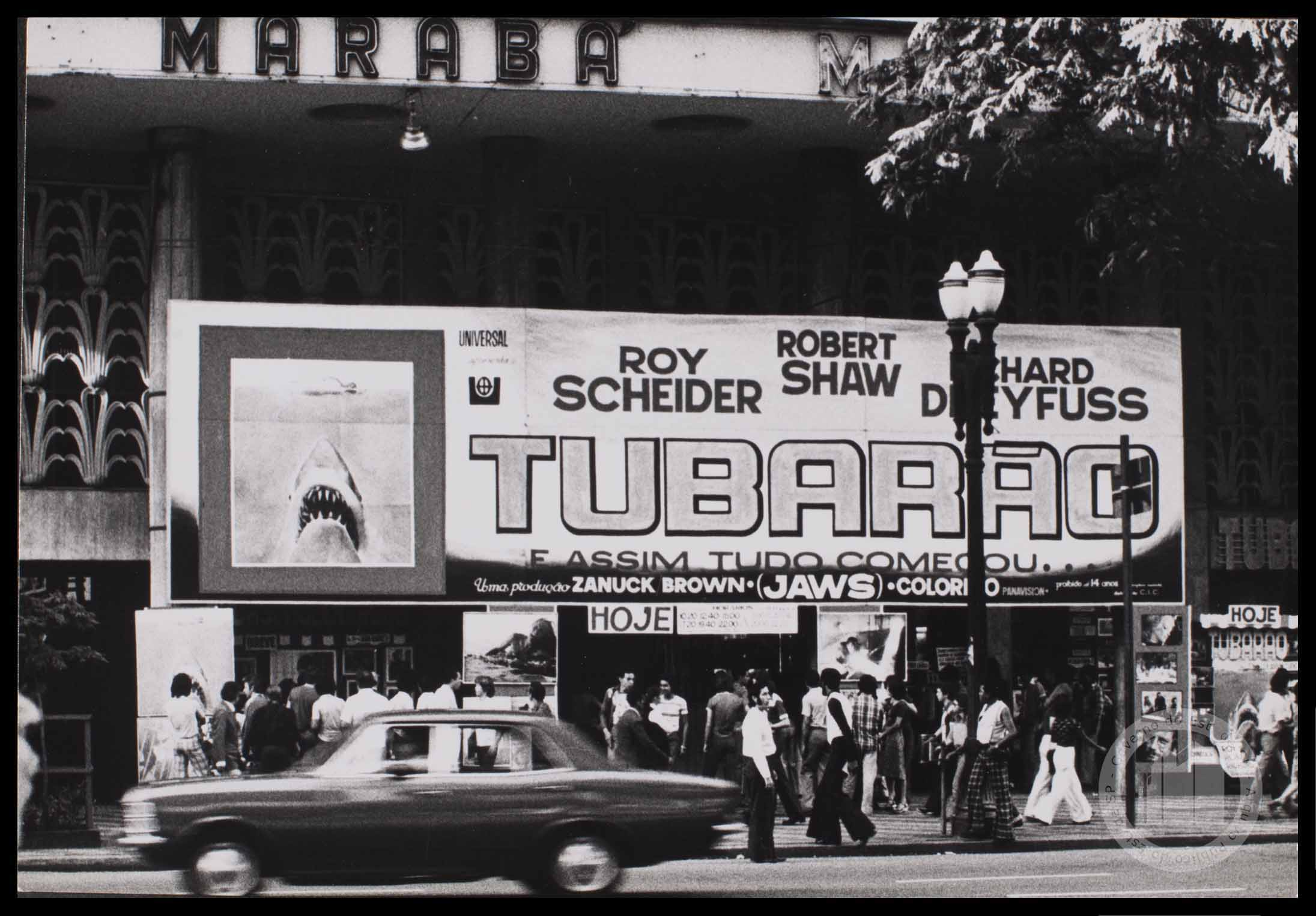
Jaws (titled "Tubarão" in Portuguese) showing at the Cine Marabá, in São Paulo, Brazil, 1977. The film attracted 13 million people to the country's cinemas, becoming the most watched production in Brazilian cinemas until the release of Titanic.

Jaws opened in 409 theaters with a record $7 million weekend and grossed a record $21,116,354 in its first 10 days recouping its production costs. It grossed $100 million in its first 59 days from 954 playdates. In just 78 days, it overtook The Godfather as the highest-grossing film at the North American box office, sailing past that picture's earnings of $86 million, and became the first film to earn $100 million in US theatrical rentals. By September 1975, 40 percent of 18-to-29-year-olds had reportedly seen it. It spent 14 consecutive weeks as the number-one film in the United States, and its initial release ultimately brought in $123.1 million in rentals. Theatrical re-releases in 1976 and the summer of 1979 brought its total rentals to $133.4 million.

The film entered overseas release in December 1975, and its international business mirrored its domestic performance. It broke records in Singapore, New Zealand, Japan, Spain, and Mexico. On January 11, 1976, Jaws became the highest-grossing film worldwide with rentals of $132 million, surpassing the $131 million earned by The Godfather. By the time of the third film in 1983, Variety reported that it had earned worldwide rentals of $270 million. Jaws was the highest-grossing film of all time until Star Wars, which debuted two years later. Star Wars surpassed Jaws for the U.S. record six months after its release and set a new global record in 1978. All told, Jaws grossed $260 million in United States and Canada, and $470 million worldwide across its various releases in the 1970s.

As of 2014, Jaws had sold 128 million tickets in the United States and Canada making it the seventh-highest-grossing movie of all time adjusted for ticket price inflation, and 243 million tickets globally. Its inflation-adjusted worldwide gross of $2 billion in 2011 made it the second-most successful franchise film after Star Wars at the time. In the United Kingdom it was the tenth highest-grossing film released between 1975 and 2018, earning the equivalent of over £80 million in 2018 currency, with admissions estimated at 16.2 million. Jaws has also sold 13 million tickets in Brazil, a quantity first surpassed by Titanic in 1998, and that still ranks as the sixth most attended film in the country.

On August 29, 2025, Jaws was re-released for its 50th anniversary. In United States and Canada it earned $950,000 in Thursday night previews and $3,080,000 on Friday, It made $8.1 million for the three-day weekend, finishing second place at the weekend box office behind Weapons, going on to earn $9.9 million over the four-day Labor Day weekend. As of September 18, 2025, the 50th anniversary reissue has earned $12.8 million in United States and Canada, and $3.4 million in other territories, for a worldwide total of $16.2 million.

Across all of its releases Jaws has grossed $280 million in United States and Canada and $215 million in other territories, for a worldwide total of $495 million.

=== Critical reception ===
Jaws received mostly positive reviews upon release. Roger Ebert of the Chicago Sun-Times gave the film four stars, calling it "a sensationally effective action picture, a scary thriller that works all the better because it's populated with characters that have been developed into human beings. It's a film that's as frightening as The Exorcist, and yet it's a nicer kind of fright, somehow more fun because we're being scared by an outdoor-adventure saga instead of a brimstone-and-vomit devil." Variety's A. D. Murphy praised Spielberg's directorial skills, and called Robert Shaw's performance "absolutely magnificent". According to The New Yorker's Pauline Kael, it was "the most cheerfully perverse scare movie ever made ... [with] more zest than an early Woody Allen picture, a lot more electricity, [and] it's funny in a Woody Allen sort of way". For New Times magazine, Frank Rich wrote, "Spielberg is blessed with a talent that is absurdly absent from most American filmmakers these days: this man actually knows how to tell a story on screen. ... It speaks well of this director's gifts that some of the most frightening sequences in Jaws are those where we don't even see the shark." Writing for New York magazine, Judith Crist described the film as "an exhilarating adventure entertainment of the highest order" and complimented its acting and "extraordinary technical achievements". Rex Reed praised the "nerve-frying" action scenes and concluded that "for the most part, Jaws is a gripping horror film that works beautifully in every department". David Thomson wrote that "like Coppola on The Godfather, Spielberg asserted his own role and deftly organized the elements of a roller coaster entertainment without sacrificing inner meanings. The suspense of the picture came from meticulous technique and good humor about its own surgical cutting. You have only to submit to the travesty of Jaws 2 to realize how much more engagingly Spielberg saw the ocean, the perils, the sinister beauty of the shark, and the vitality of its human opponents."

Vincent Canby of The New York Times wrote, "It's a measure of how the film operates that not once do we feel particular sympathy for any of the shark's victims. ... In the best films, characters are revealed in terms of the action. In movies like Jaws, characters are simply functions of the action ... like stage hands who move props around and deliver information when it's necessary". He did describe it as "the sort of nonsense that can be a good deal of fun". Los Angeles Times critic Charles Champlin disagreed with the film's PG rating, saying that "Jaws is too gruesome for children, and likely to turn the stomach of the impressionable at any age. ... It is a coarse-grained and exploitative work which depends on excess for its impact. Ashore it is a bore, awkwardly staged and lumpily written." Marcia Magill of Films in Review said that while Jaws "is eminently worth seeing for its second half", she felt that before the protagonists' pursuit of the shark the film was "often flawed by its busyness". William S. Pechter of Commentary described Jaws as "a mind-numbing repast for sense-sated gluttons" and "filmmaking of this essentially manipulative sort"; Molly Haskell of The Village Voice similarly characterized it as a "scare machine that works with computer-like precision. ... You feel like a rat, being given shock therapy". The most frequently criticized aspect of the film has been the artificiality of its mechanical antagonist: Magill declared that "the programmed shark has one truly phony close-up", and in 2002, online reviewer James Berardinelli said that if not for Spielberg's deftly suspenseful direction, "we would be doubled over with laughter at the cheesiness of the animatronic creature." Halliwell's Film Guide stated that "despite genuinely suspenseful and frightening sequences, it is a slackly narrated and sometimes flatly handled thriller with an over-abundance of dialogue and, when it finally appears, a pretty unconvincing monster."

=== Accolades ===
Jaws won three Academy Awards, those being for Best Film Editing, Best Original Dramatic Score, and Best Sound (Robert Hoyt, Roger Heman, Earl Madery, and John Carter). It was also nominated for Best Picture, losing to One Flew Over the Cuckoo's Nest. Spielberg greatly resented the fact that he was not nominated for Best Director.

Along with the Academy Award, John Williams and his score won the Grammy Award, the BAFTA Award for Best Film Music, and the Golden Globe Award. To her Academy Award, Verna Fields added the American Cinema Editors' Eddie Award for Best Edited Feature Film. The film was voted Favorite Movie at the People's Choice Awards.

It was also nominated for Best Film, Director, Actor (Richard Dreyfuss), Screenplay, Editing and Sound at the 29th British Academy Film Awards, and Best Motion Picture–Drama, Director and Screenplay at the 33rd Golden Globe Awards. Spielberg was nominated by the Directors Guild of America for the DGA Award, and the Writers Guild of America nominated Peter Benchley and Carl Gottlieb's script for Best Adapted Drama.

Year	Association	Category	Nominees	Result
1975	Academy Awards	Best Picture	Richard D. Zanuck and David Brown	Nominated
1975	Academy Awards	Best Original Score	John Williams	Won
1975	Academy Awards	Best Film Editing	Verna Fields	Won
1975	Academy Awards	Best Sound	John Carter, Roger Heman, Robert L. Hoyt, and Earl Madery	Won
1975	BAFTA Awards	Best Film	Jaws	Nominated
1975	BAFTA Awards	Best Direction	Steven Spielberg	Nominated
1975	BAFTA Awards	Best Actor	Richard Dreyfus	Nominated
1975	BAFTA Awards	Best Screenplay	Peter Benchley and Carl Gottlieb	Nominated
1975	BAFTA Awards	Best Original Music	John Williams	Won
1975	BAFTA Awards	Best Editing	Verna Fields	Nominated
1975	BAFTA Awards	Best Sound	John Carter and Robert Hoyt	Nominated
1975	Directors Guild of America Awards	Outstanding Director - Motion Picture	Steven Spielberg	Nominated
1975	Golden Globe Awards	Best Motion Picture - Drama	Jaws	Nominated
1975	Golden Globe Awards	Best Director	Steven Spielberg	Nominated
1975	Golden Globe Awards	Best Screenplay	Peter Benchley and Carl Gottlieb	Nominated
1975	Golden Globe Awards	Best Original Score	John Williams	Won
1976	Grammy Awards	Best Score Written for Visual Media	John Williams	Won
1975	Writers Guild of America Awards	Best Drama Adapted from Another Medium	Peter Benchley and Carl Gottlieb	Nominated

== Home media and television ==
The first ever LaserDisc title marketed in North America was the MCA DiscoVision release of Jaws in 1978. A second LaserDisc was released in 1992, before a third and final version came out under MCA/Universal Home Video's Signature Collection imprint in 1995. This release was an elaborate box-set that included deleted scenes and outtakes, a new two-hour documentary on the making of the film directed and produced by Laurent Bouzereau, a copy of the novel Jaws, and a CD of the soundtrack by John Williams.

On television, ABC aired it for the first time on November 4, 1979, right after its theatrical re-release, and it was an extended version. The first U.S. broadcast received a Nielsen rating of 39.1 and attracted 57 percent of the total audience, the second-highest televised movie audience at the time behind Gone with the Wind and the fourth-highest rated. In the United Kingdom, 23 million people watched its inaugural broadcast in October 1981, the second-biggest British TV audience ever for a feature film behind Live and Let Die.

MCA Home Video first released Jaws on VHS in 1980. For the film's 20th anniversary in 1995, MCA Universal Home Video issued a new Collector's Edition tape featuring a making-of retrospective. This release sold 800,000 units in North America. Another, final VHS release, marking the film's 25th anniversary in 2000, came with a companion tape containing a documentary, deleted scenes, outtakes, and a trailer.

Jaws was first released on DVD in 2000 for the film's 25th anniversary, accompanied by a massive publicity campaign. It featured a 50-minute documentary on the making of the film (an edited version of that featured on the 1995 LaserDisc release), with interviews with Spielberg, Scheider, Dreyfuss, Benchley, and other cast and crew members. Other extras included deleted scenes, outtakes, trailers, production photos, and storyboards. The DVD shipped one million copies in just one month. In June 2005, a 30th anniversary edition was released at the JawsFest festival on Martha's Vineyard. The new DVD had many extras seen in previous home video releases, including the full two-hour Bouzereau documentary, and a previously unavailable interview with Spielberg conducted on the set of Jaws in 1974. On the second JawsFest in August 2012, the Blu-ray disc of Jaws was released, with over four hours of extras, including The Shark Is Still Working. The Blu-ray release was part of the celebrations of Universal's 100th anniversary, and debuted at fourth place in the charts, with over 362,000 units sold. The film was released on 4K Ultra HD Blu-ray (4K UHD) for its 45th anniversary on June 2, 2020; it was re-released on 4K UHD for its 50th anniversary on June 17, 2025, with a new Bouzereau-directed documentary, Jaws @ 50: The Definitive Inside Story.

== Legacy ==
=== Impact on the film industry ===
Jaws was key in establishing the benefits of a wide national release backed by heavy television advertising, rather than the traditional progressive release in which a film slowly entered new markets and built support over time. Saturation booking, in which a film opens simultaneously at thousands of theaters, and massive media buys are now commonplace for the major Hollywood studios. According to Peter Biskind, Jaws "diminished the importance of print reviews, making it virtually impossible for a film to build slowly, finding its audience by dint of mere quality. ... Moreover, Jaws whet corporate appetites for big profits quickly, which is to say, studios wanted every film to be Jaws." Scholar Thomas Schatz writes that it "recalibrated the profit potential of the Hollywood hit, and redefined its status as a marketable commodity and cultural phenomenon as well. The film brought an emphatic end to Hollywood's five-year recession, while ushering in an era of high-cost, high-tech, high-speed thrillers."

Jaws also played a major part in establishing summer as the prime season for the release of studios' biggest box-office contenders, their intended blockbusters; winter had long been the time when most hoped-for hits were distributed, while summer was largely reserved for dumping films thought likely to be poor performers. Jaws and Star Wars are regarded as marking the beginning of the new U.S. film industry business model dominated by "high-concept" pictures—with premises that can be easily described and marketed—as well as the beginning of the end of the New Hollywood period, which saw auteur films increasingly disregarded in favor of profitable big-budget pictures. The New Hollywood era was defined by the relative autonomy filmmakers were able to attain within the major studio system; in Biskind's description, "Spielberg was the Trojan horse through which the studios began to reassert their power."

Jaws set the template for many subsequent horror films, to the extent that the script for Ridley Scott's 1979 science fiction film Alien was pitched to studio executives as "Jaws in space". Many films based on man-eating animals, usually aquatic, were released through the 1970s and 1980s, such as Orca, Grizzly, Mako: The Jaws of Death, Barracuda, Alligator, Day of the Animals, Tintorera, and Eaten Alive. Spielberg declared Piranha, directed by Joe Dante and written by John Sayles, "the best of the Jaws ripoffs". Among the various foreign mockbusters based on Jaws, three came from Italy: Great White, which inspired a plagiarism lawsuit by Universal and was even marketed in some countries as a part of the Jaws franchise; Monster Shark, featured in Mystery Science Theater 3000 under the title Devil Fish; and Deep Blood, which blends in a supernatural element. The 1976 Brazilian film Bacalhau parodies Jaws, featuring a killer cod in place of a shark. The 2009 Japanese horror film Psycho Shark was released in the United States as Jaws in Japan. Filmmaker Takashi Yamazaki cited Jaws and Spielberg as an influence for his 2023 Japanese kaiju film Godzilla Minus One. That same year, filmmaker Denis Villeneuve named it one of his favorite films of all time, citing it as among his influences for his 2021 adaptation of Dune.

=== Misconceptions about sharks and depopulation ===
The film had broader cultural repercussions as well. Similar to the way the pivotal scene in 1960's Psycho made showers a new source of anxiety, Jaws led many viewers to fear going into the ocean. Some even questioned whether sharks could be in Lake Michigan. Reduced beach attendance in 1975 was attributed to it, as well as more reported shark sightings.

It is still seen as responsible for perpetuating negative stereotypes about sharks and their behavior, and for producing the so-called "Jaws effect", which allegedly inspired "legions of fishermen [who] piled into boats and killed thousands of the ocean predators in shark-fishing tournaments." Benchley would later campaign to stop the depopulation of sharks, saying that "Jaws was entirely a fiction". Spielberg later echoed this sentiment, saying that he regretted "the decimation of the shark population because of the book and the film". Conservation groups have bemoaned the fact that the film has made it considerably harder to convince the public that sharks should be protected.

=== Rankings ===
In the years since its release, Jaws has frequently been cited by film critics and industry professionals as one of the greatest movies of all time. It was number 48 on American Film Institute's 100 Years ... 100 Movies, a list of the greatest American films of all time compiled in 1998; it dropped to number 56 on the 10th Anniversary list. AFI also ranked the shark at number 18 on its list of the 50 Best Villains, Roy Scheider's line "You're gonna need a bigger boat" 35th on a list of top 100 movie quotes, Williams's score at sixth on a list of 100 Years of Film Scores, and the film as second on a list of 100 most thrilling films, behind only Psycho. In 2003, The New York Times included the film on its list of the best 1,000 movies ever made. The following year, Jaws placed at the top of the Bravo network's five-hour miniseries The 100 Scariest Movie Moments. The Chicago Film Critics Association named it the sixth-scariest film ever made in 2006. In 2008, Jaws was ranked the fifth-greatest film in history by Empire magazine, which also placed Quint at number 50 on its list of the 100 Greatest Movie Characters of All Time. The film has been cited in many other lists of 50 and 100 greatest films, including ones compiled by Leonard Maltin, Entertainment Weekly, Film4, Rolling Stone, Total Film, TV Guide, Vanity Fair and Variety.

In 2001, the United States Library of Congress selected it for preservation in the National Film Registry, recognizing it as a landmark horror film and the first "summer movie". In 2006, its screenplay was ranked the 63rd-best of all time by the Writers Guild of America. In 2012, the Motion Picture Editors Guild listed the film as the eighth best-edited film of all time based on a survey of its membership.

=== Adaptations ===
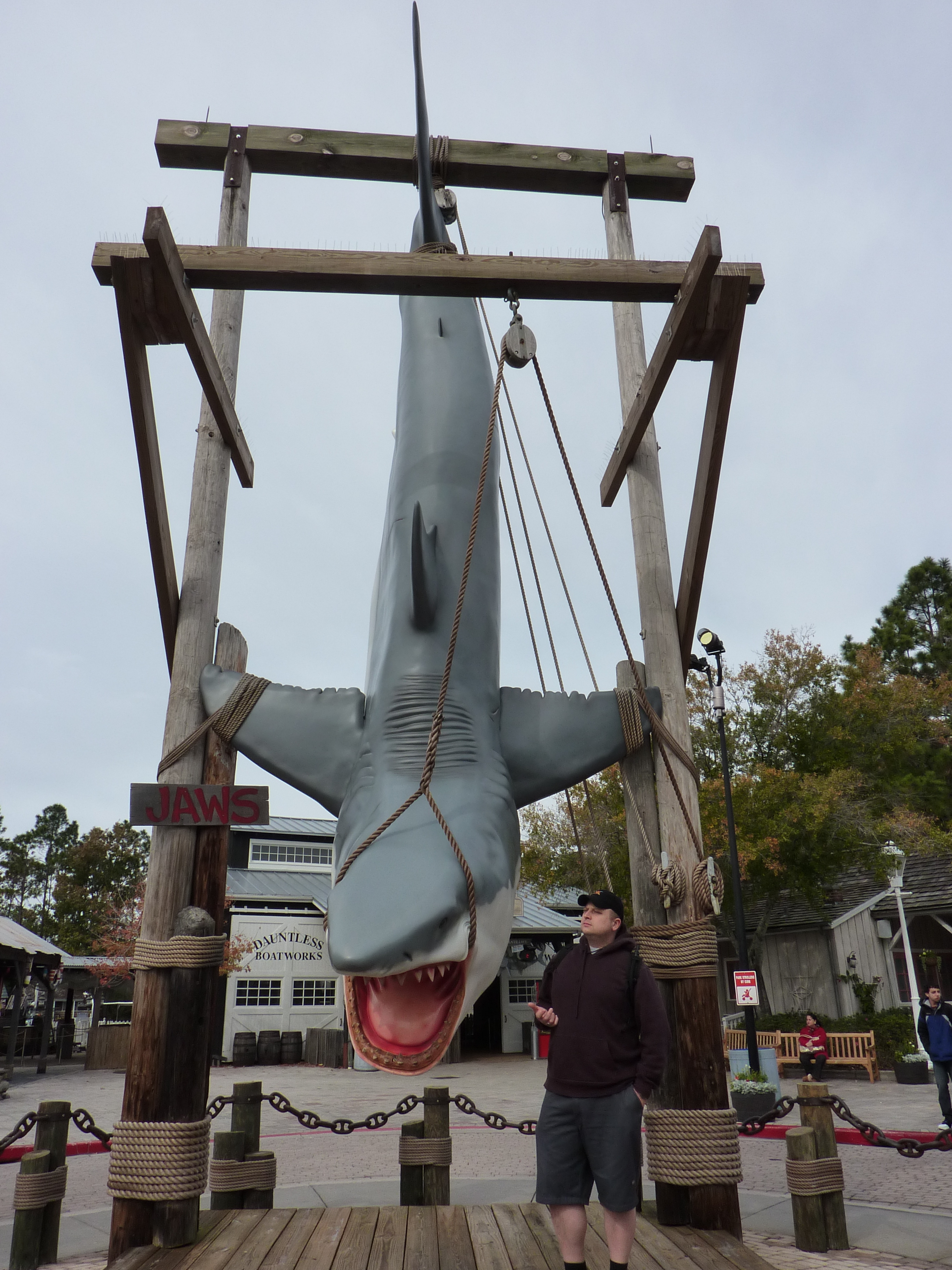
The entrance of the now-closed Jaws ride at Universal Studios Florida

The film has inspired two theme park rides: one at Universal Studios Florida, which closed in January 2012, and one at Universal Studios Japan. There is also an animatronic version of a scene from the film on the Studio Tour at Universal Studios Hollywood.

Several video games have been based on the film: 1987's Jaws, developed by LJN for the Nintendo Entertainment System; 2006's Jaws Unleashed by Majesco for the Xbox, PlayStation 2, and PC; and 2011's Jaws: Ultimate Predator, also by Majesco, for the Nintendo 3DS and Wii. In 2009, an officially licensed slot machine premiered, and in 2010, a mobile game was released for the iPhone.

In 2017, video game developer Zen Studios released a virtual pinball adaptation of the film as part of the Universal Classics add-on pack for the virtual pinball game Pinball FX 3. This table features 3D figures of Quint and Jaws, with the opportunity to play missions from either character's perspective. This table was remastered for Pinball FX on March 31, 2022. Stern Pinball produced a physical Jaws-themed pinball cabinet in 2024.

The film has inspired two musical adaptations: JAWS: The Musical! (2002) and Giant Killer Shark: The Musical, which premiered in 2006 at the Toronto Fringe Festival.

Lego released a set based on the scene where Bruce attacks the Orca with Chief Martin Brody, Matt Hooper, and Sam Quint. The set was released in August 2024 and features 1,497 pieces.

=== Tributes ===
Richard Dreyfuss made a cameo appearance in the 2010 film Piranha 3D, a loose remake of the 1978 original. Dreyfuss plays Matt Boyd, a fisherman who is the first victim of the title creatures. Dreyfuss later stated that his character was a parody and a near-reincarnation of Matt Hooper, his character in Jaws.

Primary filming location Martha's Vineyard celebrated the film's 30th anniversary in 2005 with a "JawsFest" festival, which had a second edition in 2012.

An independent group of fans produced the feature-length documentary The Shark Is Still Working, featuring interviews with the film's cast and crew. Narrated by Roy Scheider and dedicated to Peter Benchley, who died in 2006, it debuted at the 2009 Los Angeles United Film Festival.

A few months after the film's release in 1975, musician Dickie Goodman released "Mr. Jaws", a novelty song that parodied Jaws by featuring mock interviews with the film's characters, including the shark, the titular "Mr. Jaws". The break-in record was a minor hit that autumn, peaking at #4 on the Billboard Hot 100 in October 1975. In 2013, Lemon Demon, the musical project of artist Neil Cicierega, released the song "Jaws", which humorously retells the events of the film with increasing exaggerations. "Jaws" was the final single for Lemon Demon's 2014 extended play Nature Tapes, which compiled several previously released songs.

Robert Shaw's son, Ian Shaw, co-wrote and starred as his father in the play The Shark Is Broken about the making of Jaws, which premiered at the Edinburgh Fringe in 2019 and transferred to the West End in October 2021.

The musical Bruce, based on Carl Gottlieb's book The Jaws Log, had its world premiere at the Seattle Rep theatre from May 27 to July 3, 2022. The musical covers the difficulties Spielberg encountered making the movie, including the ongoing issues with the titular mechanical shark.

On November 20, 2020, a replica of Bruce the mechanical shark was lifted into place at the Academy Museum of Motion Pictures. The replica, which had been created from the film mold after the original three sharks were destroyed, was on display for 15 years at Universal Studios Hollywood before spending 25 years in a Sun Valley junkyard, until the owner donated the shark to the museum in 2016.

In July 2025, San Diego Comic-Con hosted a panel celebrating the 50th anniversary of the film's release with panelists Chris Gore, Fangoria critic Steph Cannon, Pat Jankiewicz, Jaws memorabilia collector Chris Kiszka, and moderator Mark Atkinson.

== Sequels ==
Jaws spawned three sequels to declining critical favor and commercial performance. Their combined domestic grosses amount to barely half of the first film's. In October 1975, Spielberg declared to a film festival audience that "making a sequel to anything is just a cheap carny trick". Nonetheless, he did consider taking on the first sequel when its original director, John D. Hancock, was fired a few days into the shoot; ultimately, his obligations to Close Encounters of the Third Kind, which he was working on with Dreyfuss, made it impossible. Jaws 2 (1978) was eventually directed by Jeannot Szwarc, with Scheider, Gary, Hamilton, and Jeffrey Kramer reprising their roles. It is generally regarded as the best of the sequels.

Jaws 3-D (1983) does not feature any of the original actors, although it was directed by Joe Alves, who had served as art director and production designer, respectively, on the two preceding films. Starring Dennis Quaid and Louis Gossett Jr., it was released to heavily negative reviews in 3D format. The effect did not transfer to television or home video, where it was renamed Jaws 3. Jaws: The Revenge (1987) was directed by Joseph Sargent, co-starred Michael Caine, and featured the return of Lorraine Gary as Ellen Brody. Entertainment Weekly listed it among the worst sequels ever made.

While all three sequels made a profit at the box office (Jaws 2 and Jaws 3-D were among the top 20 highest-grossing films of their respective years), critics and audiences alike were largely dissatisfied with the films.

== See also ==
- List of American films of 1975
- List of cult films
- List of natural horror films
- Survival film

== Bibliography ==
- Adamson, John E.; Morrison, Amanda (2011). Law for Business and Personal Use. Stamford, Connecticut: Cengage Learning. ISBN 978-0-538-49690-2.
- Andrews, Nigel (1999). Nigel Andrews on Jaws. London: Bloomsbury Publishing. ISBN 978-0-7475-3975-9.
- Baer, William (2008). Classic American Films: Conversations with the Screenwriters. Westport, Connecticut: Greenwood. ISBN 978-0-313-34898-3.
- Biskind, Peter (1998). Easy Riders, Raging Bulls. New York: Simon & Schuster. ISBN 978-0-684-85708-4.
- Blake, Edith (1975). The Making of the Movie Jaws. New York: Ballantine Books. ISBN 978-0-345-24882-4.
- Bowker's Complete Video Directory 1994. New York: R. R. Bowker. 1994. ISBN 978-0-8352-3391-0.
- Britton, Andrew (2009) [1979]. "Jaws". In Grant, Barry Keith (ed.). Britton on Film: The Complete Film Criticism of Andrew Britton. Detroit: Wayne State University Press. ISBN 978-0-8143-3363-1.
- Brode, Douglas (1995). The Films of Steven Spielberg. New York: Carol Publishing. ISBN 978-0-8065-1951-7.
- Brosnan, John (1978). Future Tense: The Cinema of Science Fiction. London: Macdonald and Jane's. ISBN 978-0-354-04222-2.
- Burr, Ty (1999). The 100 Greatest Movies of All Time. New York: Entertainment Weekly Books. ISBN 978-1-883013-68-4.
- Cancellaro, Joseph (2006). Exploring Sound Design for Interactive Media. Florence, Kentucky: Delmar Learning. ISBN 978-1-4018-8102-3.
- Collins, Jim; Radner, Hilary (1993). Film Theory Goes to the Movies. London: Routledge. ISBN 978-0-415-90576-3.
- Friedman, Lester D. (2006). Citizen Spielberg. Champaign: University of Illinois Press. ISBN 978-0-252-07358-8.
- Friedman, Lester D.; Notbohm, Brent (2000). Steven Spielberg: Interviews. Jackson: University Press of Mississippi. ISBN 978-1-57806-113-6.
- Gordon, Andrew (2008). Empire of Dreams: The Science Fiction and Fantasy Films of Steven Spielberg. Lanham, Maryland: Rowman & Littlefield. ISBN 978-0-7425-5578-5.
- Gottlieb, Carl (2005). The Jaws Log. New York: Newmarket Press. ISBN 978-0-571-20949-1.
- Hall, Sheldon; Neale, Stephen (2010). Epics, Spectacles, and Blockbusters: A Hollywood History. Detroit: Wayne State University Press. ISBN 978-0-8143-3008-1.
- Heath, Stephen (1985). "Jaws, Ideology, and Film Theory". In Nichols, Bill (ed.). Movies and Methods: An Anthology, Volume II. Berkeley: University of California Press. ISBN 0-520-05409-1.
- Jackson, Kathi (2007). Steven Spielberg: A Biography. Westport, Connecticut: Greenwood. ISBN 978-0-313-33796-3.
- Jameson, Fredric (1979). "Reification and Utopia in Mass Culture". Social Text (1). New York and London: Routledge: 130–148. doi:10.2307/466409. ISBN 978-0-415-90012-6. JSTOR 466409. S2CID 2800844.
- Kael, Pauline (1980) [1975]. "Notes on Evolving Heroes, Morals, Audiences". When the Lights Go Down. Beverly, Massachusetts: Wadsworth. ISBN 978-0-03-056842-8.
- Kochberg, Searle (1996). "Institutions, Audiences and Technology". In Nelmes, Jill (ed.). An Introduction to Film Studies. London: Routledge. ISBN 978-0-415-10860-7.
- Lemkin, Jonathan (1984). "Archetypal Landscapes and Jaws". In Grant, Barry Keith (ed.). Planks of Reason: Essays on the Horror Film. Lanham, Maryland: Scarecrow Press. ISBN 978-0-8108-2156-9.
- Maltin, Leonard (1999). "100 Must-See Films of the 20th Century". Leonard Maltin's Movie & Video Guide 2000. New York: Penguin Group. ISBN 978-0-452-28123-3.
- Marich, Robert (2005). Marketing to Moviegoers: A Handbook of Strategies Used by Major Studios and Independents. Cambridge, Massachusetts: Focal Press. ISBN 978-0-240-80687-7.
- Mast, Gerald; Kawin, Bruce F. (2003). A Short History of the Movies. Harlow, Essex: Longman. ISBN 978-0-321-10603-2.
- McBride, Joseph (1999). Steven Spielberg: A Biography. Cambridge, Massachusetts: Da Capo Press. ISBN 978-0-306-80900-2.
- Moritz, Charles (1978). Current Biography Yearbook 1978. New York: H. W. Wilson. ISBN 978-99973-770-2-9.
- Morris, Nigel (2007). The Cinema of Steven Spielberg: Empire of Light. New York: Wallflower Press. ISBN 978-1-904764-88-5.
- Muir, John Kenneth (2007). Horror Films of the 1970s, Volume 2. Jefferson, North Carolina: McFarland. ISBN 978-0-7864-3104-5.
- Nadler, Holly (2006). Vineyard Confidential: 350 Years of Scandals, Eccentrics, and Strange Occurrences. Rockport, Maine: Down East Enterprise Inc. ISBN 978-0-89272-687-5.
- Ochoa, George (2011). Deformed and Destructive Beings: The Purpose of Horror Films. McFarland. ISBN 978-0-7864-6307-7.
- Paszylk, Bartłomiej (2009). The Pleasure and Pain of Cult Horror Films: An Historical Survey. Jefferson, North Carolina: McFarland. ISBN 978-0-7864-3695-8.
- Petersen, Clarence (1975). The Bantam Story: Thirty Years of Paperback Publishing. Bantam Books. OCLC 1937339.
- Priggé, Steven (2004). Movie Moguls Speak: Interviews with Top Film Producers. Jefferson, North Carolina: McFarland. ISBN 978-0-7864-1929-6.
- Scanlon, Jennifer (2009). Bad Girls Go Everywhere: The Life of Helen Gurley Brown. Oxford: Oxford University Press. ISBN 978-0-19-534205-5.
- Shone, Tom (2004). Blockbuster: How Hollywood Learned to Stop Worrying and Love the Summer. New York: Simon & Schuster. ISBN 978-0-7432-3568-6.
- Sinyard, Neil (1989). The Films of Steven Spielberg. London: Hamlyn Bison. ISBN 978-0-600-55226-0.
- Siska, William Charles (1980). Toward a Semiotic Theory of Visual Communication in the Cinema. Manchester, New Hampshire: Ayer Publishing. ISBN 978-0-405-12900-1.
- Stanley, John (1988). Revenge of the Creature Features Movie Guide: An A to Z Encyclopedia to the Cinema of the Fantastic, or, Is There a Mad Doctor in the House?. Pacifica, California: Creatures at Large Press. ISBN 978-0-940064-08-9.
- Stringer, Julian (2003). Movie Blockbusters. Routledge. ISBN 978-0-415-25608-7.
- Taylor, Matt (2012). Jaws: Memories from Martha's Vineyard. London: Titan Books. ISBN 978-1-78116-302-3.
- Thomson, David (2012). The Big Screen: The Story of the Movies. New York: Farrar, Straus and Giroux. ISBN 978-0-37419-189-4.
- Turner, Graeme (1999). Film as Social Practice. London: Routledge. ISBN 978-0-415-21595-4.
- Wyatt, Justin (1994). High Concept: Movies and Marketing in Hollywood. Austin: University of Texas Press. ISBN 978-0-292-79091-9.
- Wyatt, Justin (1998). "From Roadshowing to Saturation Release: Majors, Independents, and Marketing/Distribution Innovations". In Lewis, Jon (ed.). The New American Cinema. Durham, North Carolina: Duke University Press. ISBN 978-0-8223-2115-6.
- Yewdall, David Lewis (2011). Practical Art of Motion Picture Sound. Waltham, Massachusetts: Focal Press. ISBN 978-0-240-81240-3.
