= David Westheimer =

American novelist (1917–2005)

David Westheimer (11 April 1917 — 8 November 2005), was an American novelist best known for writing the 1964 novel Von Ryan's Express, which was adapted into a 1965 film starring Frank Sinatra and Trevor Howard.

Born in Houston, Texas in 1917, Westheimer, a Rice University graduate, worked as an assistant editor for the Houston Post from 1939 to 1946, excluding the time he spent in United States Army Air Forces during World War II. As a navigator in a B-24 he was shot down over Italy on December 11, 1942, and spent time as a prisoner of war until 1945.

Westheimer's first novel, Summer on the Water, was published in 1948. He later wrote the novelization of the film Days of Wine and Roses, based on the screenplay by his friend J.P. Miller. Despite being one of his most popular novels, it was not credited to Westheimer for much of the book's shelf life. In Days of Wine and Roses's original printing, he was by-lined as the author. However, the book's publisher Bantam Books subsequently removed Westheimer's name. Bantam Books also moved Days of Wine and Roses to the "literature" category and keep it in print (which they did, for decades). Subsequent printings were branded only J.P. Miller's Days of Wine and Roses. In addition to Von Ryan's Express, Westheimer wrote a television pilot set in an Italian prisoner of war camp called Campo 44.

He died in Ronald Reagan UCLA Medical Center on November 6, 2005, due to heart failure.

== Fiction ==
- Summer on the Water, Macmillan, 1948
- The Magic Fallacy, Macmillan, 1950
  - Briefly noted in The New Yorker 25/50 (4 February 1950) : 90
- Watching Out for Dulie, Dodd, 1960
- A Very Private Island, Signet (New American Library), 1962, under the pseudonym "Z.Z. Smith"
- Days of Wine and Roses, Bantam, 1963 (novelization of the screenplay by J.P. Miller)
- Von Ryan's Express, Doubleday, 1964
- My Sweet Charlie, Doubleday, 1965 (adapted into a 1970 television movie)
- Song of the Young Sentry, Little, Brown, 1968
- Lighter than a Feather, Little, Brown, 1971
- Over the Edge, Little, Brown, 1972
- Going Public, Mason & Lipscomb, 1973
- The Olmec Head, Little, Brown, 1974
- The Avila Gold, Putnam, 1974
- Rider on the Wind, London: Michael Joseph, 1979
- Von Ryan's Return, Coward, 1980
- Delay en Route, 2004

== Nonfiction ==
- Sitting it Out: A World War II POW Memoir, Rice University Press, 1992.
