= Roger Heman Sr. =

American sound engineer (1898–1969)

- Born: February 27, 1898; Kentucky, U.S.
- Died: March 14, 1969 (aged 71); Los Angeles, California, U.S.
- Occupation: Sound engineer
- Years active: 1921-1966

Roger Heman Sr. (February 27, 1898 – March 14, 1969) was an American sound engineer. He won an Academy Award for Best Special Effects and was nominated for four more in the same category. He worked on more than 350 films during his career. His son was also a sound engineer.

== Selected filmography ==
Heman won an Academy Award for Best Special Effects and was nominated for four more:

Won

- Crash Dive (1943)

Nominated

- The Black Swan (1942)
- Wilson (1944)
- Captain Eddie (1945)
- Deep Waters (1948)
