= Irv Drasnin =

American journalist and filmmaker (born 1934)

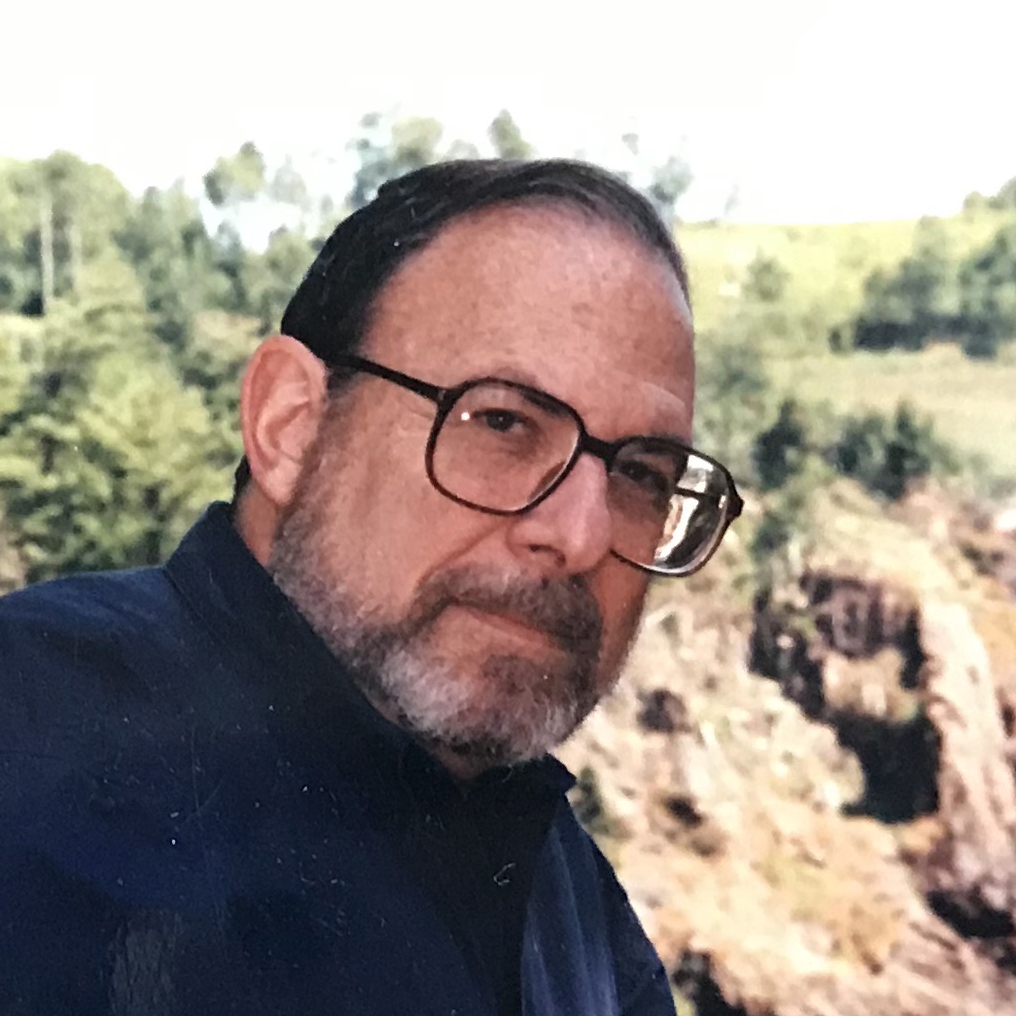
- Drasnin in 1991
- Born: March 18, 1934 (age 92); Charleston, West Virginia, U.S.
- Education: UCLA (BA); Harvard University (MA)
- Occupations: Journalist and documentary film producer, director, writer
- Spouse: Dr. Xiaoyan Zhao (m. 1987)
- Writing career
- Notable works: Misunderstanding China; Looking for Mao; Apartheid; The Guns of Autumn; You and the Commercial; The Radio Priest; The Chip vs. the Chess Master; Forever Baseball; Health in America
- Notable awards: duPont Columbia, Directors Guild of America, Writers Guild of America, Emmy
- Website: irvdrasnin.net

Irv Drasnin (born March 18, 1934) is an American journalist, a producer-director-writer of documentary films for CBS News and PBS (Frontline, The American Experience, Nova). Among the awards he has received for broadcast journalism are the duPont-Columbia, the Directors Guild (DGA), the Writers Guild (WGA), and the American Film and Video Blue Ribbon.

== Films ==
Film title	Year	Network
The China Films
Misunderstanding China	1972	CBS News
Shanghai	1974	CBS News
After Mao	1976	CBS News
Looking for Mao	1983	PBS/Frontline
China After Tiananmen	1992	PBS/Frontline
The Revolutionary	2012	Independent Documentary Feature
Other Foreign Subjects
Apartheid	1988	PBS/Frontline
Who's Got a Right to Rhodesia	1977	CBS News
A Black View of South Africa	1970	CBS News
Voices from the Russian Underground	1970	CBS News
Cuba: 10 Years of Castro	1968	CBS News
American Society, Culture and History
Health in America: The Promise and the Practice	1970	CBS News
You and the Commercial	1973	CBS News
The Guns of Autumn	1975	CBS News
Inside the Union	1979	CBS News
New Voices in the South	1971	CBS News
Football: 100 Years Old and Still Kicking	1969	CBS News
Back on the Road with Charles Kuralt	1969	CBS News
The Twentieth Century: Synanon in Prison	1966	CBS News
The Chip vs. the Chess Master	1991	PBS/Nova
G-Men: The Rise of J. Edgar Hoover	1991	PBS/The American Experience
The Radio Priest	1988	PBS/The American Experience
Forever Baseball	1989	PBS/The American Experience
The Earthquake is Coming	1987	PBS/Frontline
Hollywood Dreams	1986	PBS/Frontline
Catholics in America: Is Nothing Sacred?	1985	PBS/Frontline
The Other Side of the Track	1984	PBS/Frontline
Eye of the Beholder	1981	PBS/Inside Story Special
Where We Fight	1993	The Discovery Channel

== Early life ==
Irv Drasnin was born in Charleston, West Virginia, on March 18, 1934, a son of immigrants: his father, Joseph, a U.S. Treasury Agent, was from Tsarist Russia, as was his mother, Clara Aaron. The family moved to Los Angeles when he was four years old. His oldest brother, Sid, was an architect, remembered (with Lloyd Wright) for the Wayfarer's Chapel in Palo Verdes, California, and for The Gardens of the World in Thousand Oaks, California. His brother Bob played clarinet, sax and flute with the Les Brown Orchestra and Red Norvo quintet among others, performed in Carnegie Hall as a classical musician, was the director of music at CBS, and a composer and teacher.

== Education ==
Drasnin is a graduate of Carthay Center Elementary School, John Burroughs Junior High School and Los Angeles High School (1952). He has a BA in political science from UCLA, where he was student body president (1955–56); editor of The Daily Bruin (for which the paper was awarded an All-American rating as one of the top five college dailies in the country); and Men's Representative to the Student Council (1954). He also was a member of Project India (1954), one of twelve students selected each year to spend the summer in India, speaking about America and interacting with Indian college students.

He has a MA from Harvard in East Asian Studies (1957–59) with a specialization in China. He taught in the Master's Film Program at Stanford University (1980–82).

== Career ==
=== United Press International ===
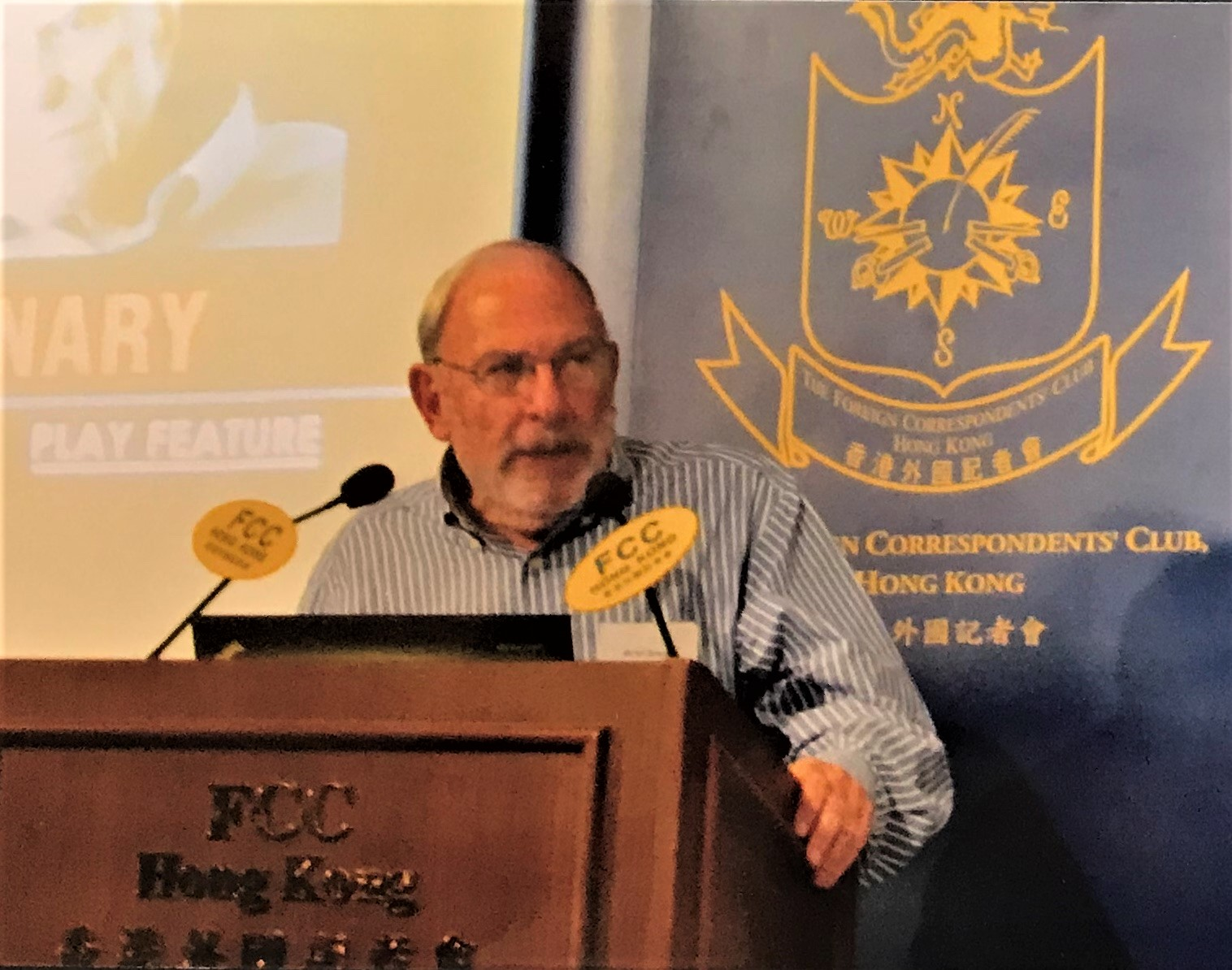
Irv Drasnin speaking at the Foreign Correspondents Club of Hong Kong (2012)

He began his career as a reporter at United Press International, in Pittsburgh, Pennsylvania, the eastern division news headquarters (1959–60), where the stories he covered included the steelworkers strike of 1959, the visits of Soviet leaders Kozlov and Khrushchev, Wightman Cup Tennis. He wrote both for newspapers and radio.

=== CBS News Broadcasts ===
In 1961 he was hired by CBS News as a writer for daily news broadcasts, becoming a producer for Calendar, a public affairs program with Harry Reasoner; and the CBS Evening News with Walter Cronkite. His assignments for the evening news covered major news events, including the civil rights movement. He was the producer of CBS News coverage in Selma, Alabama including "Bloody Sunday" (March 1965) and for the Senate passage of the Voting Rights Act that followed. Other assignments included the Republican Convention of 1964, the successful presidential campaign of Lyndon Johnson, the funeral of Winston Churchill in London, the space program (the Mercury 6 flight of Wally Schirra), and the World Series, Dodgers vs the Orioles, Cardinals vs. the Red Sox.

=== Documentary film years at CBS News and PBS ===
CBS News, 1966–79. PBS, 1982–92, for Frontline, The American Experience and Nova.

His thirty documentaries include a chronicle of modern China beginning with Misunderstanding China (CBS News), Shanghai (CBS News), Looking for Mao (PBS/Frontline), China After Tiananmen (PBS/Frontline) and The Revolutionary, an independent feature-length film.

When US-China relations were restored in 1972 after a 20-year hiatus, each of the three U.S. television networks was allowed access to film a documentary. Drasnin drew the assignment for CBS News, spending ten-weeks inside the country to make the film Shanghai. In 1991, he reported in depth from China in the wake of the government's violent crackdown on student-led demonstrations in Beijing's Tiananmen Square, China After Tiananmen.

His foreign reporting also covered southern Africa and the last stands of white colonial rule in Who's Got A Right to Rhodesia (CBS News) and in Apartheid (PBS/Frontline).

Mr. Drasnin's domestic topics include The Guns of Autumn (CBS News), You and the Commercial (CBS News), Health in America (CBS News), Inside the Union (CBS News), The Radio Priest (PBS/The American Experience), The Chip vs The Chess Master (PBS/Nova), and Forever Baseball (PBS/The American Experience.).

== Personal life ==
He is married to Xiaoyan Zhao, former senior vice president and global polling director for New York-based GfK Roper Public Affairs. The couple has lived in New York City (1987–1996) and Hong Kong (1997–1998) where Xiaoyan was the founding managing director of Roper's Asia-Pacific Headquarters. They now reside in Los Altos, California.

== Awards ==
Award	Year	Film title
duPont-Columbia Award	1972-73	You and the Commercial
duPont-Columbia Award	1970	Health in America: The Promise and the Practice
Directors Guild	1976	The Guns of Autumn
Writers Guild	1975	The Guns of Autumn
Writers Guild	1989	Apartheid
Writers Guild nomination	1970	Health in America: The Promise and the Practice
Writers Guild nomination	1972	Misunderstanding China
Writers Guild nomination	1990	Forever Baseball
Writers Guild nomination	1991	The Chip vs. The Chess Master
Writers Guild nomination	1993	China After Tiananmen
Emmy Award	1971	A Black View of South Africa
American Film and Video Festival, Blue Ribbon	1988	The Radio Priest
American Film and Video Festival, Blue Ribbon	1990	Forever Baseball
National Educational Film Festival	1993	China After Tiananmen
Christopher Award	1974	You and the Commercial
Christopher Award	1970	A Black View of South Africa
Ohio State Award	1973	You and the Commercial
Saturday Review Award	1970	Voices from the Russian Underground
