= John Stransky Jr. =

American sound engineer

- Born: June 19, 1904; Pukwana, South Dakota, U.S.
- Died: March 22, 1996 (aged 91); Woodland Hills, California, U.S.
- Occupation: Sound engineer
- Children: 2

John Stransky Jr. (June 19, 1904 – March 22, 1996) was an American sound engineer. He was nominated for a Primetime Emmy Award in the category Outstanding Sound Mixing for the television film My Sweet Charlie.

Stransky died on March 22, 1996 of pancreatic cancer at the Motion Picture & Television Fund cottages in Woodland Hills, California, at the age of 91.
