= Earl Madery =

American sound engineer

- Born: August 17, 1918; Central City, Iowa
- Died: February 21, 2014 (aged 95)
- Occupation: Sound engineer
- Years active: 1956–1983

Earl Martin Madery (August 17, 1918 – February 21, 2014) was an American sound engineer. He won an Oscar for Best Sound for the film Jaws.

== Selected filmography ==
- Jaws (1975)
