= John Carter (sound engineer) =

American sound engineer

- Born: October 22, 1907; Gainesville, Virginia, United States
- Died: February 22, 1982 (aged 74); Los Angeles, California, United States
- Occupation: Sound engineer
- Years active: 1944–1980

John Carter (October 22, 1907 – February 22, 1982) was an American sound engineer. He won an Academy Award for Best Sound for the film Jaws. He worked on more than 110 films between 1944 and 1980.

== Selected filmography ==
- Jaws (1975)
