= Moïse Vauquelin =

17th-century French pirate

Moise Vauquelin
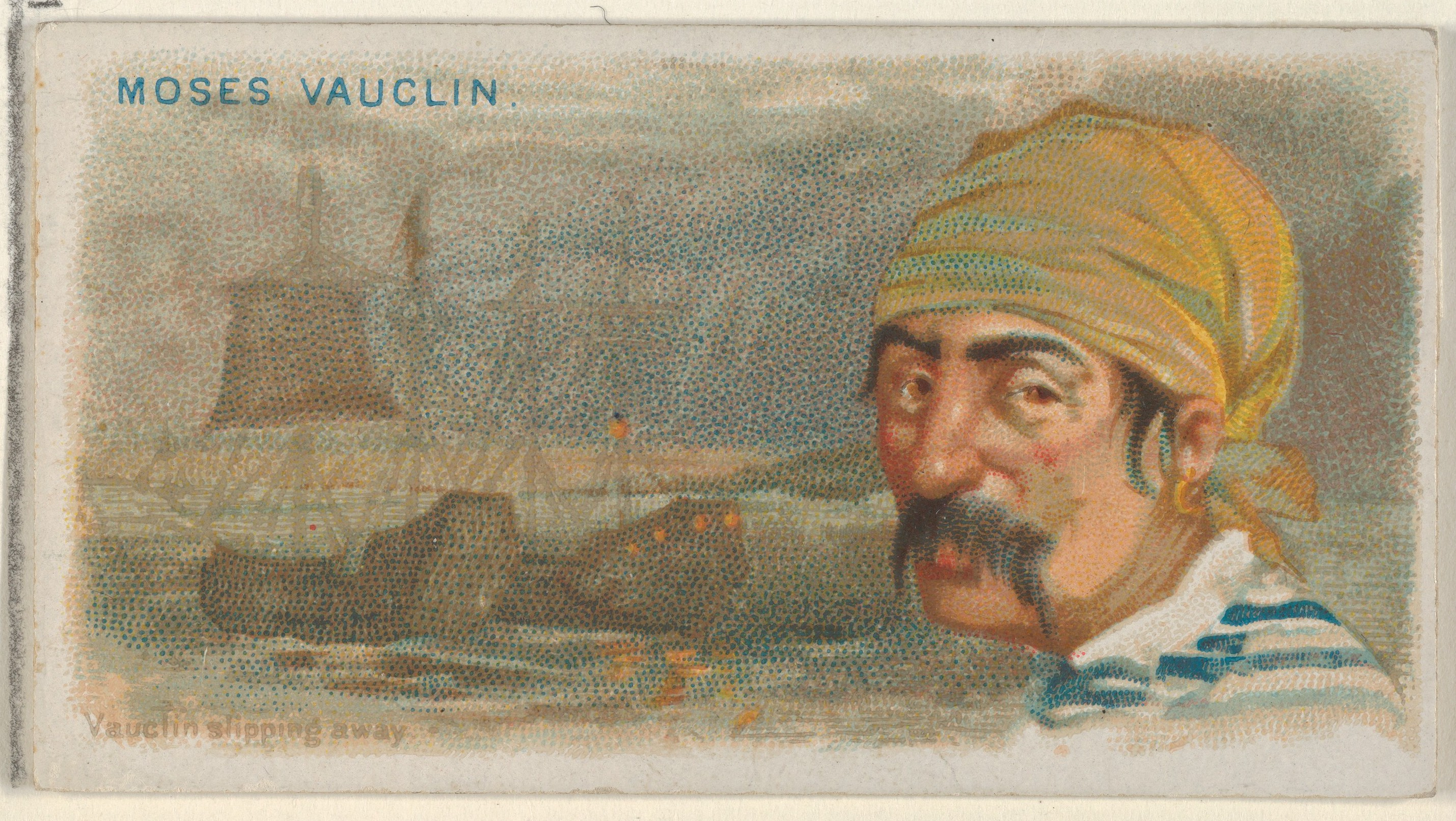
- Born: fl. 1650; Normandy, France
- Died: 1670
- Piratical career
- Type: Buccaneer
- Allegiance: France
- Years active: 1650-1670
- Rank: Captain
- Base of operations: Tortuga

Moïse Vauquelin or Moses Vanclein (fl. 1650–1670) was a French buccaneer. During his four-year career as a pirate, he served as an officer under François l'Olonnais and formed a brief partnership with Pierre Le Picard. He and Philippe Bequel later co-wrote a book detailing their explorations of the Honduran and Yucatán coastline.

== Biography ==
Vauquelin first arrived in the Caribbean from Normandy, France around 1650. He was part of a buccaneering fleet being organized by l'Olonnais at the pirate haven of Tortuga, which would loot and plunder Spanish settlements throughout the Spanish Main during the next two years. Vauquelin was one of several officers serving in this expedition and was present at the raids against Maracaibo and Gibraltar in 1666 and Puerto de Cavallo and San Pedro in 1667.

L'Olonnais and his fleet eventually split up, arguing over l'Olonnais' desire to sail for Guatemala shortly after the capture of a Spanish ship off the coast of the Yucatán. Vauquelin and Pierre le Picard chose to leave the expedition, with some accounts suggesting they were the ringleaders and instigators of the fleet's disbandment, and began privateering together for a time. Sailing along the coast of Costa Rica, Vauquelin captured the town of Veraguas, although he was driven from the area when he failed to take the nearby town of Nata; the two privateers split up soon after. This defeat was later recorded in Alexander Esquemeling's The Buccaneers Of America almost twenty years later.

Vauquelin seems to have lost his ship after this, although the circumstances are unrecorded. He did, however, manage to join the French pirate Chevalier du Plessis later that year. After du Plessis' death, Vauquelin was elected as his successor by the crew. He and his crew were able to successfully capture a Spanish prize carrying a large cargo of cacao near the port of Havana, Cuba before returning to Tortuga. In 1670, he and fellow buccaneer Philippe Bequel wrote an account of their careers at the Vice-Admiral Jean d'Estrées. The book contained detailed information of the geography of the Caribbean and West Indies, particularly the coasts of Honduras and the Yucatán, which were used by the Royal French Navy as well as later buccaneers.
