= Michel le Basque =

French pirate

- Born: Michel Etchegorria
- Occupations: Pirate and flibustier
- Years active: 1666–1668
- Known for: Companion of François L'Olonnais
- Notable work: Sacked Maracaibo and Gibraltar

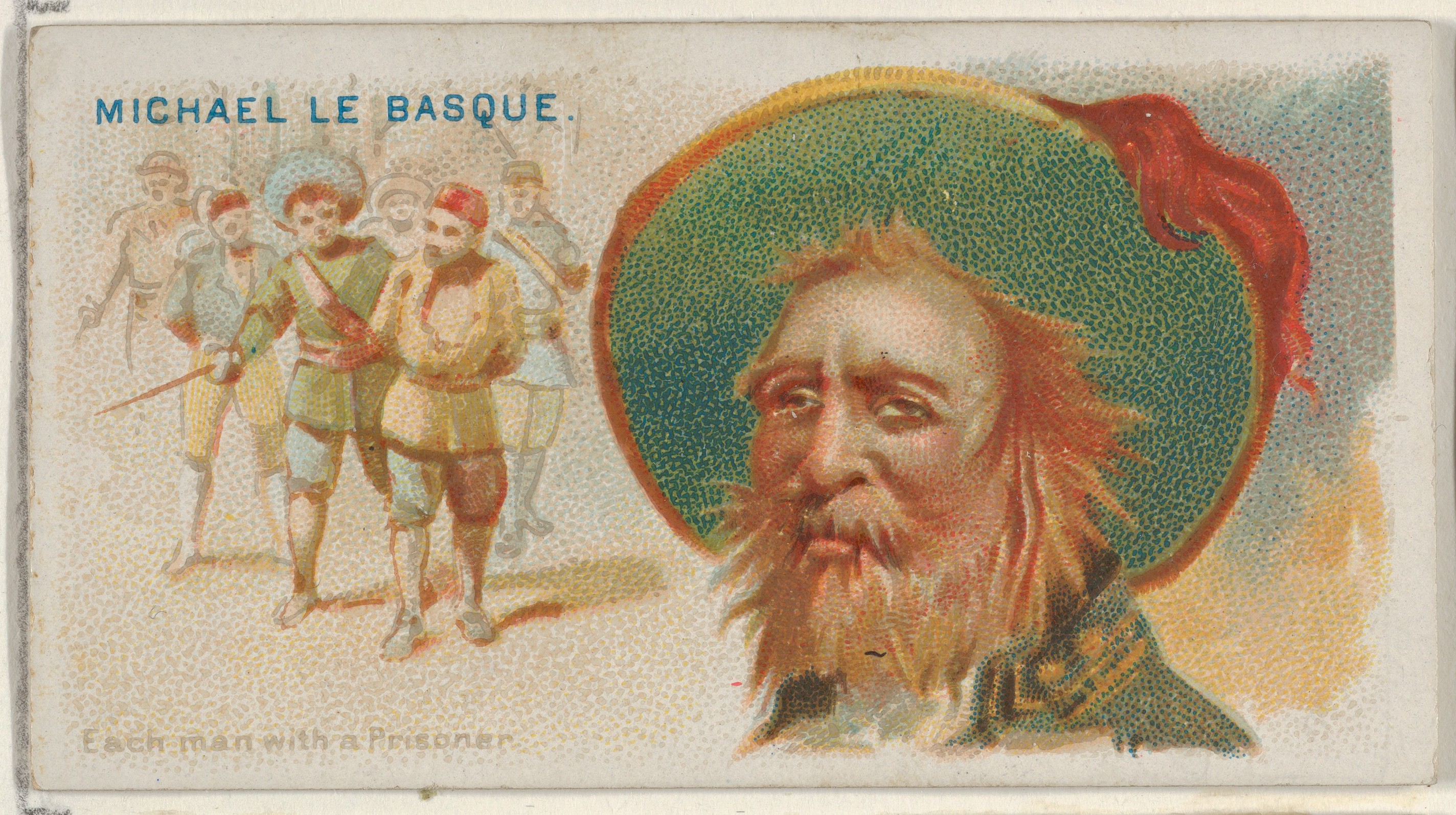
Michael Le Basque, Each Man with a Prisoner, from the Pirates of the Spanish Main series (N19) for Allen & Ginter Cigarettes, print, George S. Harris & Sons (MET, 63.350.201.19.14)

Michel le Basque (born Michel Etchegorria; fl. 1666–1668) was a pirate and flibustier (French buccaneer) from the Kingdom of Navarre in the southwest of France. He is best known as a companion of François L'Olonnais, with whom he sacked Maracaibo and Gibraltar.

== History ==
Michel le Basque of Saint-Jean-de-Luz was an early buccaneer, hunting oxen and wild pigs on Santo Domingo and neighboring islands around 1657. Successful as a buccaneer, he retired to Santo Domingo and was appointed as a district official by Governor Bertrand D’Ogeron. In 1666, in Portobelo he took part in the seizure of the Spanish galleon Margarita from the Tierra Firme squadron, a capture yielding over a million piastres. He then joined forces with corsair L’Olonnais, using his own ship to ferry their ground troops.

Later, in 1666, they undertook one of the first great buccaneer expeditions on the South American continent. They gathered eight boats and a landing force of 650 men. On the way to Maracaibo, they captured a few vessels, including a large Spanish ship loaded with cocoa and 300,000 talers of silver.

Maracaibo, located at the end of the lake of the same name, was connected to the sea by a narrow channel defended by a 16-gun fort called Castillo de San Carlos. L’Olonnais and le Basque landed their troops out of reach of the fort’s guns, capturing it after a three-hour land battle. They made their way up the channel and attacked the city, which then had 4,000 inhabitants and a 250-man, 14-gun garrison who defended the town bitterly.

While they were still engaged at Maracaibo, the buccaneers learned that a Spanish detachment had been sent as reinforcement. L’Olonnais marched to meet them with 380 men, and ambushed them not far from the small town of Gibraltar. The Spaniards lost 500 men, while the buccaneers suffered only 40 dead and 30 wounded. L'Olonnais spent six weeks in the city of Gibraltar, which he ransacked, collecting an enormous haul of cattle, gold, jewels, silver ingots, silks, and slaves.

When an epidemic broke out in the ranks of pirates, they set fire to the city and returned to Maracaibo, which they plundered thoroughly. The city was largely deserted; L’Olonnais tortured the captives they’d taken to force them to reveal where they’d hidden their valuables. The buccaneers’ treasure amounted to 260,000 pieces of eight and a great deal of religious objects and jewelry.

After the capture of Maracaibo, le Basque continued piracy for a few years. The Spanish sent two ships to capture him; with two small boats he boarded the larger Spanish ships and seized them in turn. Reportedly he sent a letter thanking the Governor of Cartagena for having equipped him with such good ships. Again in 1667, le Basque returned with only forty men and once more attacked Maracaibo, taking the richest inhabitants as hostages for ransom. Finally he returned to Basque Country where he, like Jean-Baptiste du Casse and others, was received and congratulated by the Sun King, Louis XIV. Some sources say he returned to the Caribbean where he captured a Spanish ship off Portobello in 1668, and was killed later that year leading a raiding party upriver.

== In popular culture ==
The story of the attacks on Maracaibo and Gibraltar, although softened and treated with artistic license, is used by Emilio Salgari in his novel The Black Corsair.

Purported female buccaneer Jacquotte Delahaye (actually an invention of a 1940s French novelist) was said to have rejected a marriage proposal from le Basque.

le Basque's story was dramatized as the serial novelette "The Pearl-Fisher" by Emmanuel Gonzales.

== See also ==
- Pierre Francois and Alexandre Bras-de-Fer – Two other French buccaneers who were supposedly contemporaries of L'Olonnais.
