= Pierre Francois =

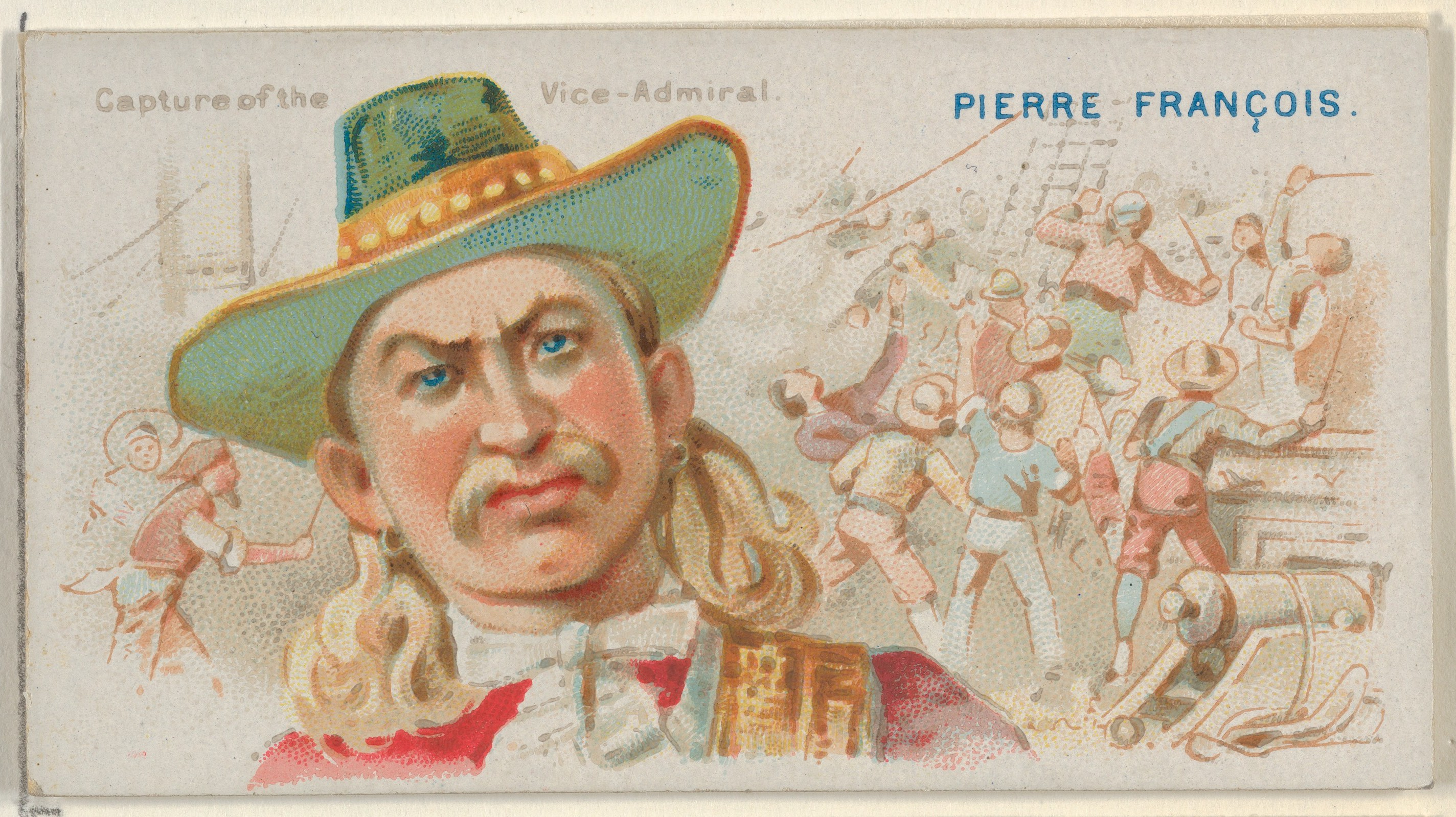
- Pierre François, Capture of the Vice-Admiral, from the Pirates of the Spanish Main series (N19) for Allen & Ginter Cigarettes MET DP835028
- Years active: Mid-17th-century
- Known for: A single attack on a Spanish pearl-diving fleet
- Piratical career
- Base of operations: Caribbean

Pierre Francois (Anglicized as "Peter Francis") was a mid-17th-century flibustier, or French buccaneer, active in the Caribbean. He is best known for a single attack on a Spanish pearl-diving fleet. His story appears only in Alexandre Exquemelin's History of the Buccaneers and the truth of his account is uncertain.

== History ==
No definitive dates are given for Francois' exploits. According to Exquemelin, Francois had been lying in wait for Spanish ships traveling between Campeche and Maracaibo but had little success. His 26-man crew grew restless so they elected to raid the Spanish pearl-diving operations off Rio de le Hacha. Francois tried to slip in unnoticed but the small pearl-diving boats fled under the guns of a man-of-war for protection. When they let down their guard Francois instead attacked the Vice-Admiral's 8-gun, 60-man ship, capturing it after a fierce boarding action.

He sunk his old leaking vessel and forced the Spanish crew to help man the new ship. Putting up a Spanish flag, he tried to board the 200-man, 24-gun man-of-war itself but the warship gave chase. Francois fled the warship but unfurled too much sail in a strong wind, breaking his ship's mast. The warship caught them and defeated Francois and his buccaneers, who agreed to surrender "on condition that they should not be used as slaves to carry stones, or be employed in other labours for three or four years, as they served their negroes" and were instead set ashore. Another source (via Exquemelin, from a different translation) claims Francois and his men were sentenced to servitude anyway, eventually sent to Spain where they escaped and returned to France.

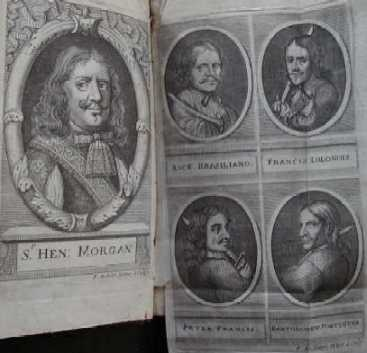
Morgan, L'olonnais, Francois, Portugues, and Brasiliano

== Authenticity ==
The story of Pierre Francois is known from a single source, Alexandre Exquemelin's History of the Buccaneers in America. Exquemelin accompanied Henry Morgan and other buccaneers during their exploits in the 1660s and 1670s and wrote detailed accounts. Exquemelin's eyewitness account of Morgan, L'Olonnais, and the other expeditions he directly witnessed is "generally reliable; modern historians judge it to be largely accurate in its descriptions." But especially regarding second-hand accounts he related, such as Pierre Francois, "it remains a matter of opinion as to how much of Exquemelin's book is reliable."

== See also ==
- Alexandre Bras-de-Fer and Daniel Montbars – two buccaneers whose stories were not in Exquemelin's original Dutch book, but appeared only in later French translations.
