= Cutlass =

Short sword used by sailors on sailing ships

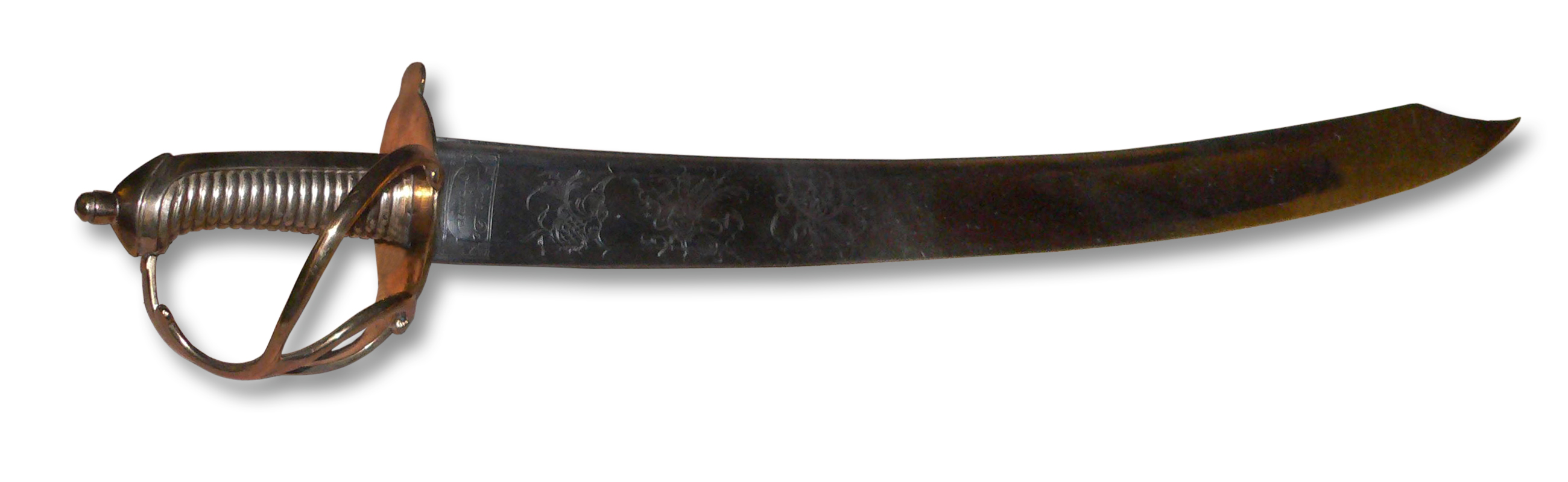
- Type: Sword (short sabre, single-edged)
- Place of origin: Europe

Service history
- In service: 17th, 18th, 19th, and early 20th century
- Used by: Sailors, pirates, and privateers

Specifications
- Length: 28 to 32 in (71 to 81 cm) (leadcutter cutlasses were up to 36 in (91 cm) in length).
- Blade type: Single-edged
- Hilt type: Cup hilted guards, half-basket cup guards, and branch guards were commonly seen with cylindrical hilts and wire-wrapped hilts which are common and found on most cutlasses.

A cutlass is a short, broad sabre or slashing sword with a straight or slightly curved blade sharpened on the cutting edge and a hilt often featuring a solid cupped or basket-shaped guard. It was a common naval weapon during the Age of Sail.

== Etymology ==
The word "cutlass" developed from the 17th-century English use of coutelas, a 16th-century French word for a machete-like mid-length single-edged blade (the modern French for "knife", in general, is couteau; in 17th- and 18th-century English the word was often spelled "cuttoe"). The French word coutelas may be a convergent development from a Latin root, along with the Italian coltellaccio or cortelazo, meaning "large knife". In Italy, the cortelazo was a similar short, broad-bladed sabre popular during the 16th century. The root coltello, for "knife", derived ultimately from the Latin cultellus meaning "smaller knife", which is the common Latin root for both the Italian and French words.

In the English-speaking Caribbean, the word "cutlass" is also used as a word for machete.

== History and use ==
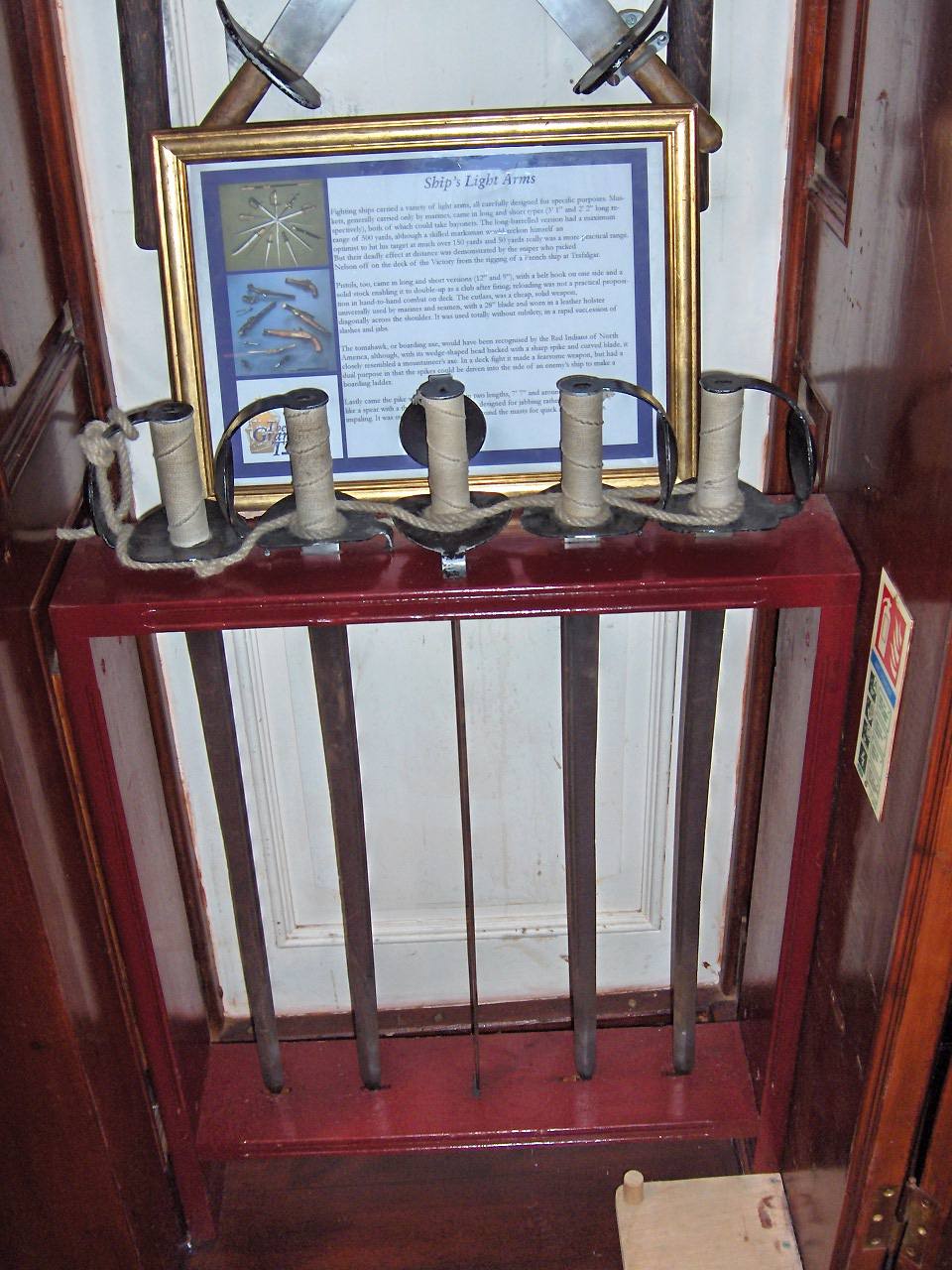
Cutlasses aboard the frigate Grand Turk

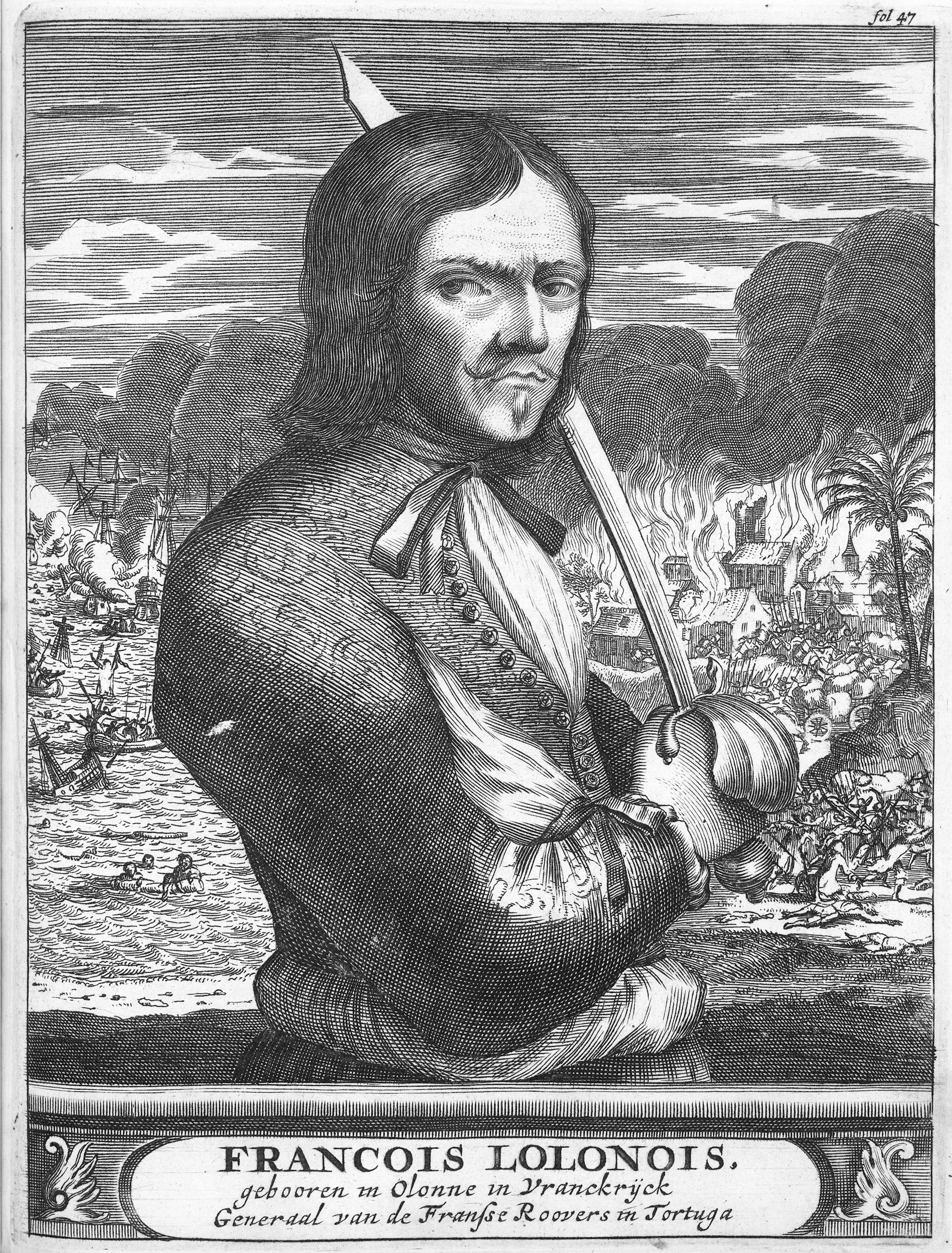
François l'Olonnais with a cutlass

=== Origin ===
The cutlass is a 17th-century descendant of the edged short sword, exemplified by the medieval falchion.

Woodsmen and soldiers in the 17th and 18th centuries used a similar short and broad backsword called a hanger, or in German a Messer, meaning "knife". Often occurring with the full tang (i.e. slab tang) more typical of daggers than swords in Europe, these blades may ultimately derive through the falchion (facon, falcon, fauchard) from the falx or seax.

In England, about 1685 the rather long straight-bladed sword formerly in use began to be superseded by the "hanger". This weapon had a short and more or less curved single-edged blade with a brass hilt of a rather flat double-shell and knuckle-bow. The grip was generally of wood, bound with wire, but some specimens show a brass grip with spiral grooves. These are probably early models. The length of the blade is usually about 24 inches (61 cm).

=== History ===
Although also used on land, the cutlass is best known as the sailor's preferred weapon, as it was robust enough to hack or cut through heavy ropes, thick canvas, and dense vegetation while being short enough to be used in relatively close quarters combat, such as during boarding actions, in the rigging, or below decks. Another advantage to the cutlass was its simplicity of use, as it required less training than that required to master a rapier or small sword.

Cutlasses are famous for being used by pirates, although there is no reason to believe that Caribbean buccaneers invented them, as has occasionally been claimed. However, the subsequent use of cutlasses by pirates is well documented in contemporary sources, notably by the pirate crews of William Fly, William Kidd, and Stede Bonnet. French historian Alexandre Exquemelin reports the buccaneer François l'Ollonais using a cutlass as early as 1667. Pirates used these weapons for intimidation as much as for combat, often needing no more than to grip their hilts to induce a crew to surrender, or beating captives with the flat of the blade to force their compliance or responsiveness to interrogation.

Owing to its versatility, the cutlass was as often an agricultural implement and tool as it was a weapon (cf. machete, to which the same comment applies). It was used commonly in rain forest and sugarcane areas, such as the Caribbean and Central America. In their most simplified form they are held to have become the machete of the Caribbean.

The leadcutter sword was a weapon modelled on the cutlass, designed for use in shows and demonstrations of swordsmanship in the late Victorian era. Wilkinson Sword made these swords in four sizes, no. 1 to no. 4, of increasing weight to suit the strength of the user. The leadcutter was so named because in demonstrations it was used to cut a lead bar in half. Wilkinson included a mould for the lead bar with each purchase of their swords.

Late naval examples
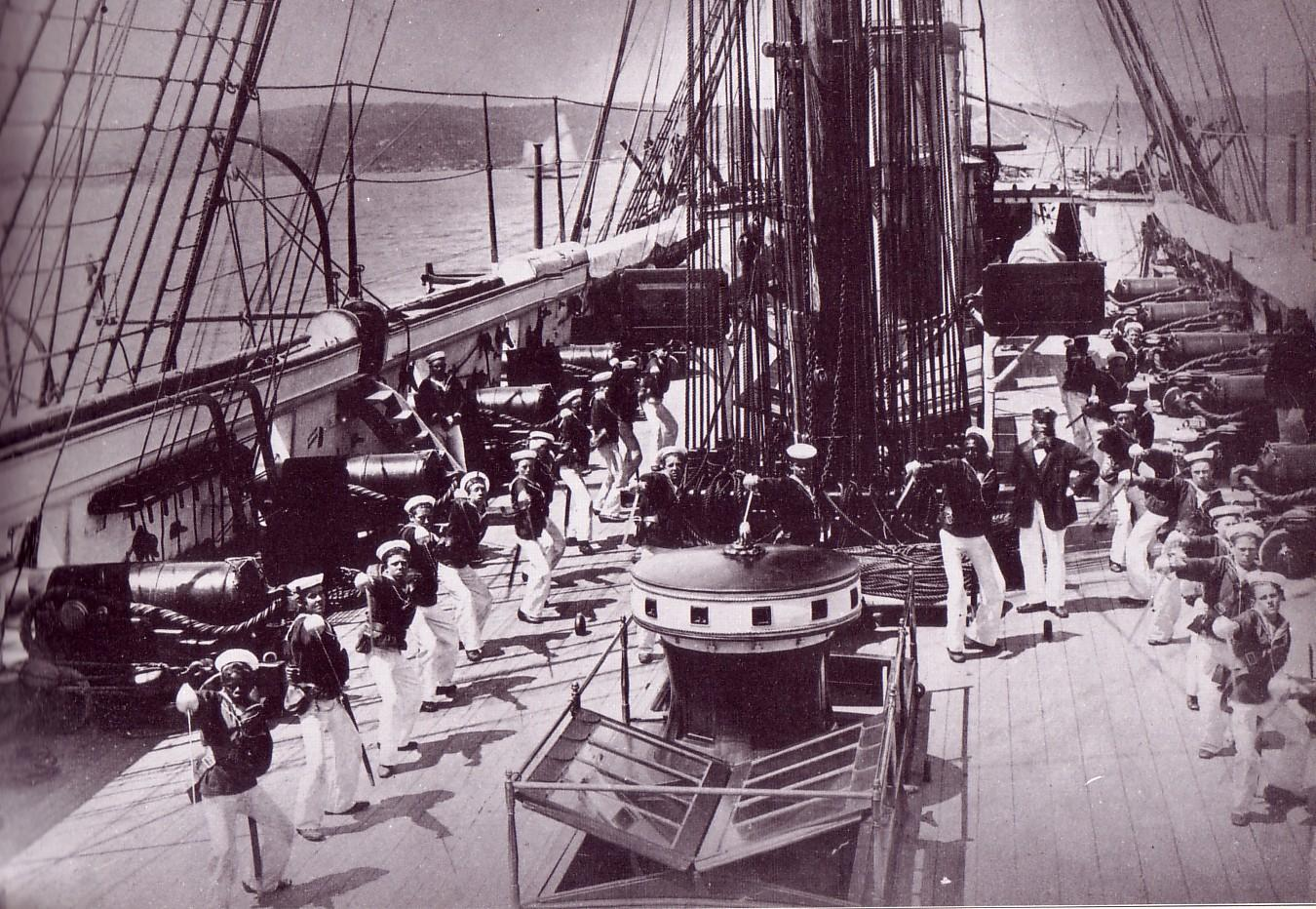
A cutlass drill on HMS Wolverine, 1882

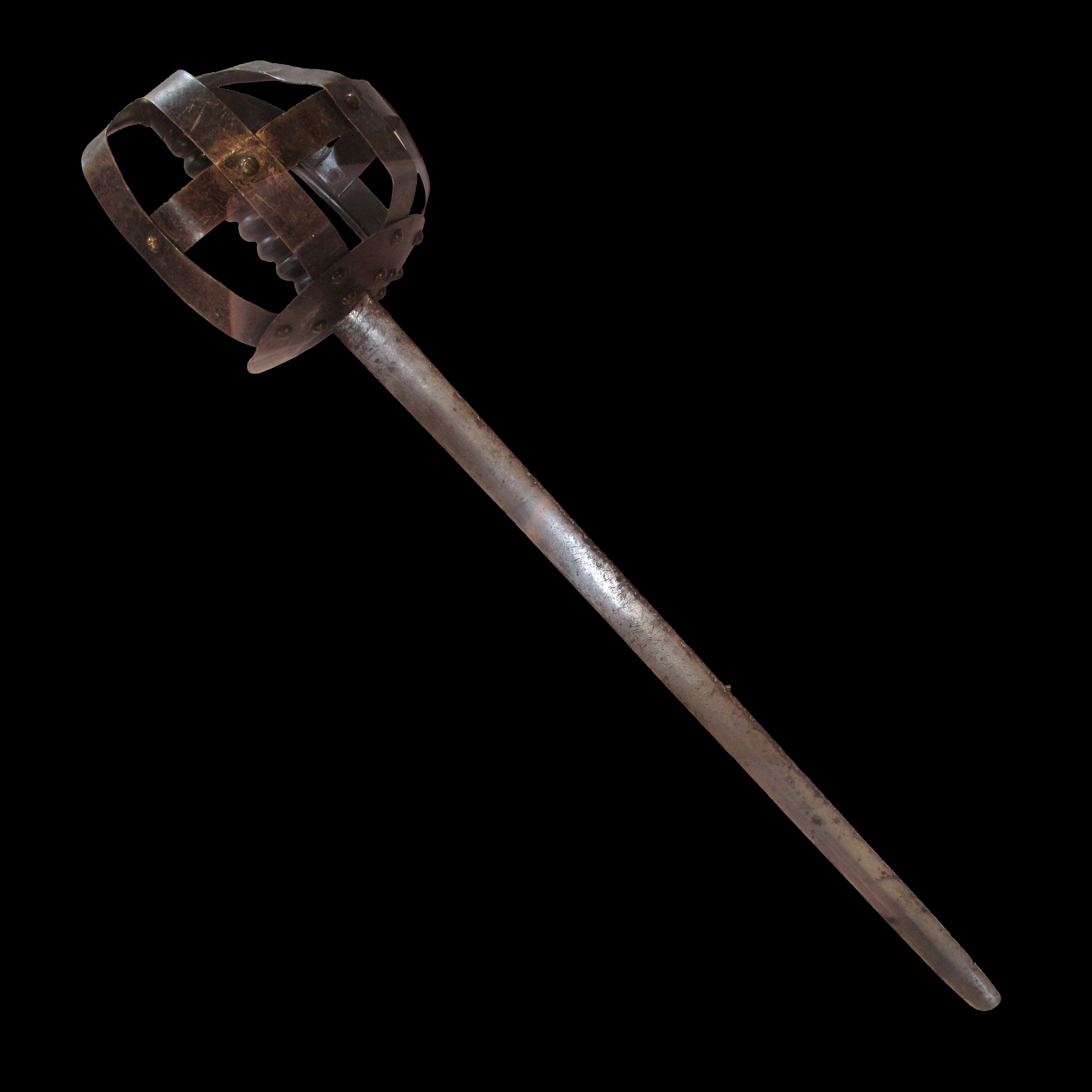
Training cutlass, late 19th century

=== Modern history ===
In 1830, after a constable of the London Metropolitan Police was shot and stabbed while on duty, the Home Secretary ordered that each police officer in the force "should be issued with a cutlass for his defence"; training in their use was provided at Wellington Barracks. Initially carried while on night duty, they were soon relegated to being kept in the local inspector's office for use in an emergency. Provincial police forces sometimes deployed cutlasses during public disorder, using the hilts and flat edges of the blades to strike rioters, but there is no record of anyone being killed with one. The last recorded issue of police cutlasses was during the Tottenham Outrage, an armed robbery in 1909.

In 1936, the British Royal Navy announced that from then on cutlasses would be carried only for ceremonial duties and not used in landing parties. The last recorded use of cutlasses by the Royal Navy is often said to be on 16 February 1940 during the boarding action known as the Altmark Incident. However, this is disbelieved by the majority of the HMS Cossack Association (Cossack was the ship that boarded Altmark) and the authors of British Naval Swords and Swordsmanship. The authors point to another claim, a boarding by HMS Armada in 1952, but disbelieve this one too. In their view, the last use of cutlasses by the Royal Navy was by a shore party in China in 1900. Cutlasses continue to be worn in the Royal Navy by Chief Petty Officers when escorting the White Ensign and by Senior or Leading Ratings as part of an escort at a court-martial.

The cutlass remained an official weapon in the United States Navy until it was stricken from the Navy's active inventory in 1949. The cutlass was seldom used for weapons training after the early 1930s. The last new model of cutlass adopted by the US Navy was the US M1917 cutlass, adopted during World War I; it was based on the Dutch M1898/M1911 klewang. Although cutlasses were still being made during World War II under the US M1941 designation, this was only a slightly modified variant of the US M1917 cutlass. A US Marine Combat Engineer NCO is reported to have killed an enemy combatant with a US M1941 cutlass at the Battle of Inchon during the Korean War. A cutlass is still carried by the recruit designated as the Recruit Chief Petty Officer for each recruit division while at the US Navy Recruit Training Command. In a message released 31 March 2010, the US Navy approved optional wear of a ceremonial cutlass as part of the Chief Petty Officer dress uniform, pending final design approval. That approval came in January 2011, and the cutlass was made available for ceremonial wear by Chief Petty Officers in August of that same year.

== See also ==
- Chinese butterfly sword
- Dirk, another blade weapon specialized for naval hand-to-hand combat
- Terciado, an Iberian cutlass
- Elgin cutlass pistol
