= Pierre le Grand (pirate) =

French pirate of disputed historicity

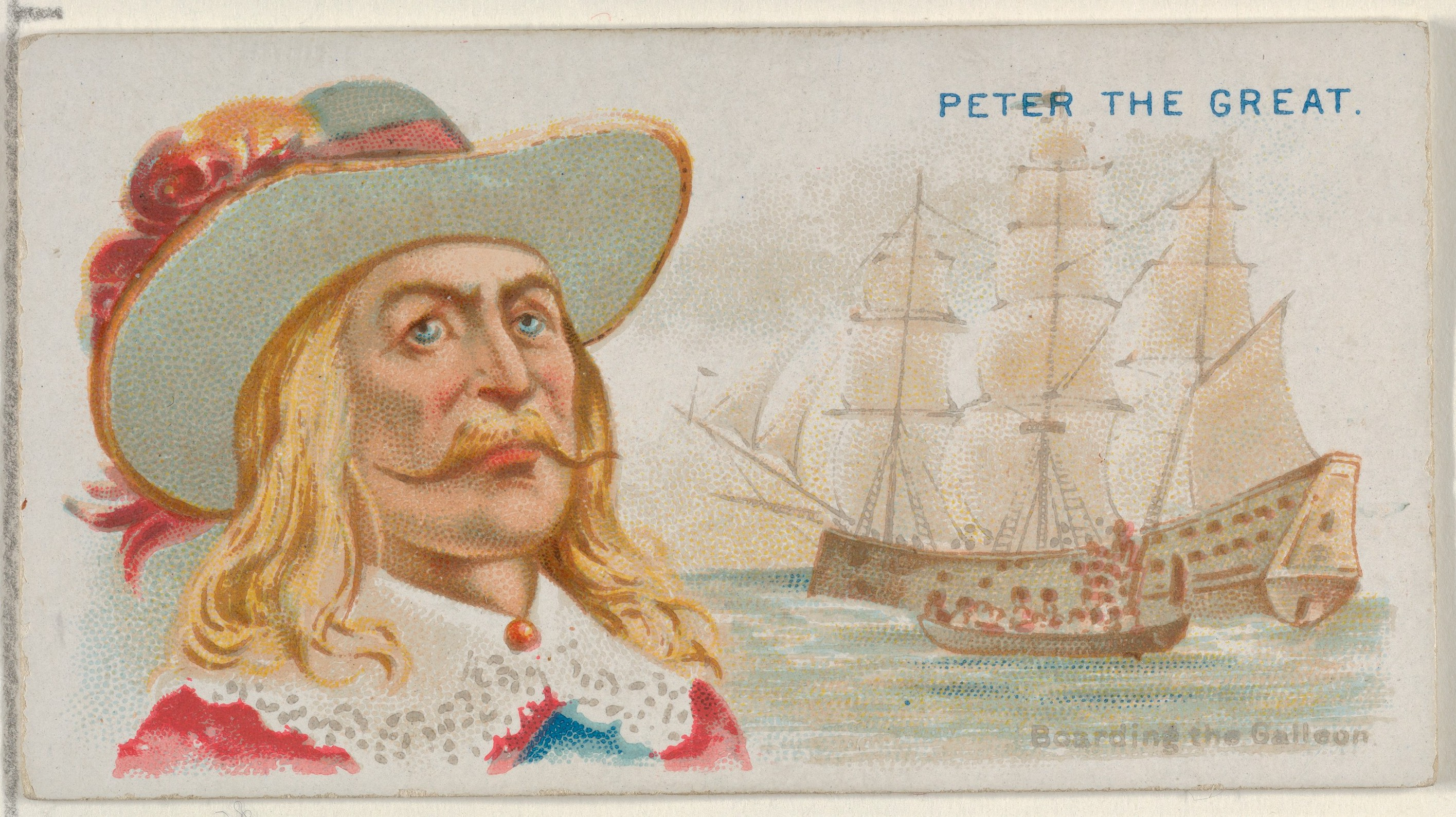
- Peter the Great, pirate
- Born: Dieppe, France
- Died: Canada
- Piratical career
- Type: Pirate
- Years active: 17th century
- Base of operations: Caribbean

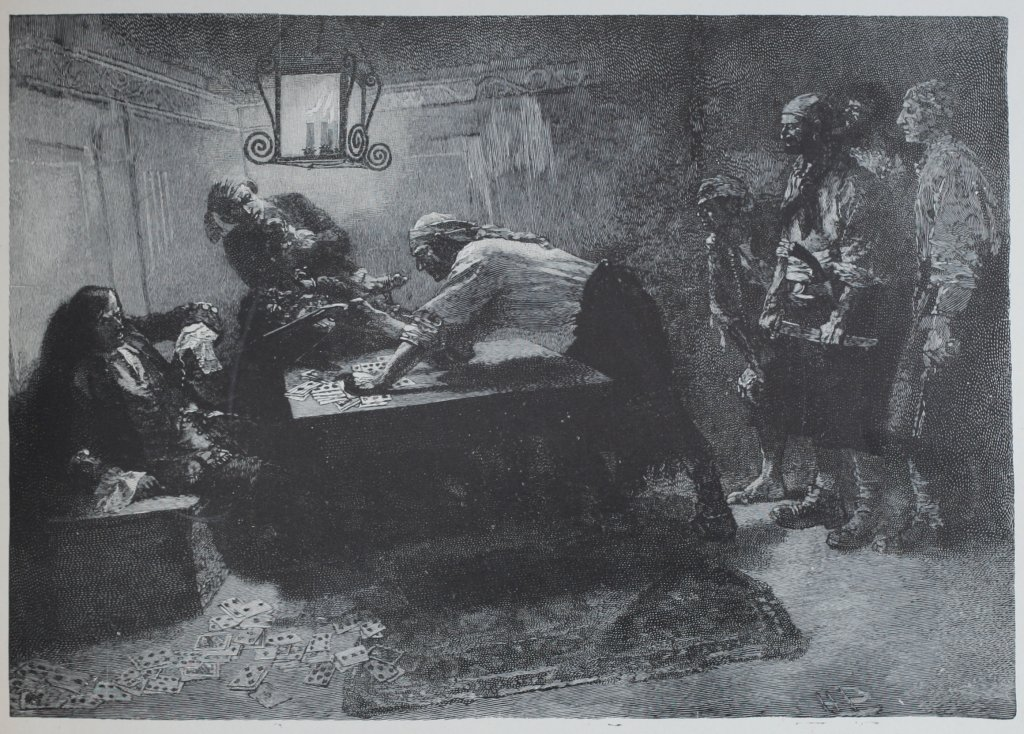
Pierre le Grand catches a Spanish captain off guard in his cabin. Engraving by Howard Pyle.

Pierre le Grand (French: Peter the Great) was a French buccaneer supposedly active during the 17th century. He is known to history from only one source, Alexandre Exquemelin's Buccaneers of America, and thus his historical existence has been questioned. The accounts that Exquemelin gives of Le Grand and another buccaneer named Pierre Francois are also remarkably similar. It is possible that Exquemelin, who was not an eye-witness to these events, was confused. Pierre le Grand (Pierre the Great) could have been a nickname for Pierre Franc(ois). However, there does seem to be at least one reference to Le Grand in historical records other than Exquemelin. C. H. Haring's well-researched 'The Buccaneers in the West Indies in the XVII Century' (1910), note 1 on page 135, refers to a Spanish report that credited Pierre Legrand with leading a raid against Spanish settlements in Cuba and Havana in 1665. English records, however, credit Edward Mansfield with leading these attacks. On the other hand, Exquemelin states that Franc was born in Dunkirk. As for Le Grand, he deliberately identifies 1602 as the period of his activity, since he wishes to provide an account of the early days of piracy; in the case of Franc, he merely recounts further episodes involving pirates. Furthermore, given that Exquemelin himself was born on the northern coast of France, it would be unreasonable to assume that he might have confused the birthplaces of Dieppe and Dunkirk.

== Origins ==
Pierre was born in Dieppe, France. Nothing is known of his life before his arrival in Tortuga at some time in the mid-17th century.

== Attack on Spanish galleon ==
Pierre le Grand is known only for his attack on a Spanish galleon near the coast of Hispaniola in the 17th century. The exact site of the attack is uncertain; Exquemelin at one point says the Caicos Islands were the scene of the crime, and at another point places the attack at Cape Tiburón, off the southwest coast of Hispaniola.

Pierre had recruited a crew of 28 men on a single small boat and sailed in search of Spanish ships to rob. After a long, fruitless cruise, his buccaneer band spotted a ship, a straggler from the Spanish treasure fleet. They voted to pursue it, and shortly after sunset, they drew alongside their prey without being seen.

The legend says that Pierre ordered the crew's surgeon to cut a hole in the side of their own boat and sink it, to inspire the men to fight their hardest for lack of a means of retreat. Then the pirates climbed up the side of the galleon, armed with swords and pistols.

Surprise was complete. The pirates took the galleon's captain unawares while he played cards in his own cabin. Pierre's men also seized the gun room, slaughtering the Spanish guards and preventing the rest of the Spanish crew from obtaining weapons to defend themselves and their ship. The galleon's sailors had little choice but to surrender.

Pierre le Grand then forced some of the Spanish crew into his service, set the rest ashore (presumably on Hispaniola), and took his captured ship and his men to France. He then disappears from history. However, there is some indication that he may have emigrated to Canada, as his name appears in the immigration records as arriving in Montreal in 1653.
