= Philippe Bequel =

17th-century French privateer

Philippe Bequel (fl. c. 1650–1669) was a 17th-century French privateer.

Possibly born in La Rochelle, France, Bequel may have served under privateers Mathurin Gabaret and François Beaulieu during the 1650s and, by the end of the decade, he had become captain of his own ship. Operating from the port of Cagway (later renamed Port Royal after its capture by the British several years later), Bequel was granted permission by Governor D' Oyley to attack Spanish shipping on 13 December 1659.

At the request of Deschamps of Rausset, Bequel would use the small island colony of Tortuga as a base of operations until shortly after the British capture of Jamaica. Arriving at Port Royal in late 1663, he would later become one of the first foreign privateers to receive a letter of marque by the colonial governor of Jamaica.

During his privateering career, he may have sailed with François l'Ollonais in his less than successful raids against Honduras and Nicaragua during 1667 and 1668. He was reportedly based at Tortuga or along the coast of Santo Domingo during the late-1660s and later served as a pilot for a royal marine squadron under the command Vice Admiral Count Jean II d'Estrées while in the Antilles in 1669. The following year, at the request of d'Estrées, he and Moïse Vauquelin wrote a report detailing their raids against Honduras and Yucatán.
