= Chevalier du Plessis =

Chevalier du Plessis was a French pirate active in the West Indies in the 1660s. Du Plessis allowed fellow privateer Moïse Vauquelin to work on board and when he died in 1668, Vauquelin succeeded him as captain.
