= Alexandre Bras-de-Fer =

French buccaneer

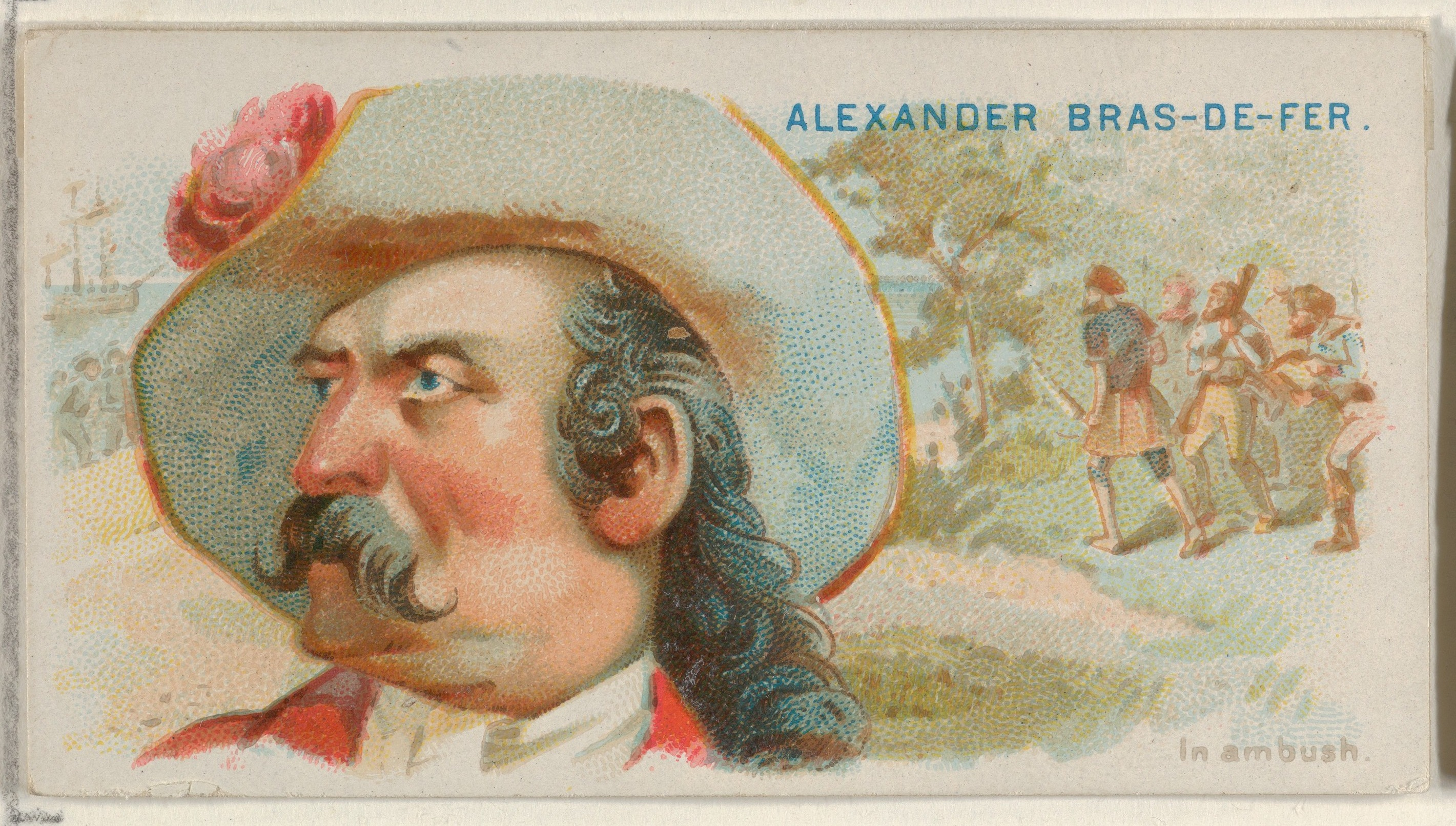
Alexander Bras-de-Fer, In Ambush, from the Pirates of the Spanish Main series (N19) for Allen & Ginter Cigarettes MET DP835002

Alexandre Bras-de-Fer was a flibustier (French buccaneer) in the latter half of the mid-17th century. He is best known for capturing a Spanish ship after being shipwrecked, though his story is possibly apocryphal.

== History ==
Though supposedly a contemporary of L’Olonnais, no definitive dates are known for Bras-de-Fer's activities. He was described as preferring to sail alone on a fast, clean ship rather than as part of a pirate flotilla, and hand-picked his crew for their knowledge, and skill as well as their manners. He was also said to have instituted an early version of the Pirate Articles. He adopted his name “Bras-de-Fer” - translated as “Iron Arm” - as a pseudonym, a tactic used by a number of other buccaneers.

In the story for which he is best known, his 100-man ship Phoenix was becalmed for a time off the Spanish Main before being caught in a sudden storm near Bocas del Dragón (between Venezuela and Trinidad and Tobago). Caught in a waterspout, the Phoenix was destroyed when lightning struck its gunpowder magazines. Bras-de-Fer and about twenty of the crew swam ashore to an island inhabited by hostile natives. They fought off the natives and waited until an armed Spanish merchant ship anchored offshore and sent parties inland looking for fresh water. Bras-de-Fer and his men ambushed and killed the Spanish shore party. Bras-de-Fer himself defeated the Spanish Captain in a furious sword fight. Now dressed in the Spaniards’ armor and uniforms, they returned to the ship and boarded, surprising the crew when they revealed their identities. They secured the richly-laden ship, marooned the surviving Spanish crew, and sailed away.

== Authenticity ==
Bras-de-Fer's story is known from a single source, Alexandre Exquemelin’s History of the Buccaneers in America. Exquemelin accompanied a number of buccaneer expeditions and wrote from first-hand experience. His work was originally published in Dutch but was later translated into Spanish, French, German, English, and other languages. The translations frequently differ in content, dropping particular chapters and adding others, some “either plagiarized or completely invented.” The tale of Bras-de-Fer appears in the French edition (with other added material) but not in Exquemelin's original Dutch version: “Accounts of two other buccaneers, Montbars and Alexandre Bras-le-Fer, are inserted, but d'Ogeron's shipwreck on Porto Rico and the achievements of Admiral d'Estrees against the Dutch are omitted. In general the French editor, the Sieur de Frontignières, has re-cast the whole story.”

== In popular culture ==
Two fictional novels about pirates, in which Alexandre Bras-de-Fer makes an appearance:

- “Mortallone and Aunt Trinidad” by Arthur Quiller-Couch (1916) (full text available free online)
- “The Buccaneer Chief: A Romance of the Spanish Main” by Gustave Aimard (2015)

== See also ==
- Daniel Montbars – Another buccaneer whose story originally appears in Exquemelin's History.
