= Leadcutter sword =

Broad English sword

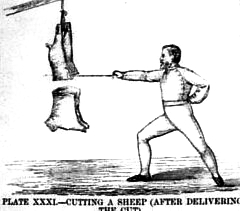
Diagram depicting use of a leadcutter sword in sword feats, specifically the dissevering of a sheep carcass.

The Leadcutter sword or lead cutter is a type of broad, heavy, specialist English sword or cutlass.

== History ==
Popular in the 19th century, these weapons resemble an enlarged naval cutlass, consisting of single-edged, flatbacked blades with broad widths, often flexible and sometimes slightly curved, always with a full cutlass-type hilt. The swords, heavier than standard cutlasses, were designed for strength training and for "sword feats" (most often the severing of specially made triangular lead bars, hence the name). These displays often included the dissevering of whole sheep's carcasses and of balanced lead bars in a single blow.

== Prominent manufacturer and size descriptions ==
A prominent manufacturer of Leadcutters was Wilkinson Sword, which produced the sword in four sizes, Model 1 being the lightest and Model 4 being the largest and heaviest. A Model 2 blade measures in at 31 in (790 mm) in length and 1.75 in (44 mm) in width, with a model 3 blade 33 in (840 mm) long and 2 in (51 mm) wide.
