= Gonzalo Piña Ludueña =

Gonzalo de Piña y Ludueña or Lidueña (Gibraltar, 1545 – Caracas, 1600) was a Spanish Noble, conquistador, and colonial administrator in the Province of Venezuela between 1597 and 1600.

Gonzalo de Piña Ludueña was born in Gibraltar in 1545 which was then part of Spain. He moved to the Americas and settled down in Mérida, currently Western Venezuela, becoming one of the first Spanish inhabitants of the town. He was since then responsible for establishing several new towns and hamlets in the area, such as Nuestra Señora de Pedraza (founded in 1591 and known now as Pedraza, state of Barinas), or San Antonio de Gibraltar (currently known as Gibraltar, located in the state of Zulia). San Antonio de Gibraltar was named after Gonzalo de Piña Ludueña's hometown as authorised by the city council of Mérida, which, in need of a new harbour, commissioned its construction on the shore of Lake Maracaibo in 1592.

Upon the promotion of the former governor of the Province of Venezuela, Diego de Osorio, to head of the Real Audiencia of Santo Domingo, Piña Ludueña was appointed governor by the king Philip II on April 17, 1597, and remained in office until his death, on March 28, 1600. He also wrote "Description of the Lake Maracaybo and Magdalena River" (Descripción de la laguna de Maracaybo y río de la Magdalena).

Government offices
Preceded by Diego de Osorio y Villegas	Governor of the Province of Venezuela; 1597–1600	Succeeded by Alonso Suárez del Castillo
