= Gibraltar, Venezuela =

- Location within Venezuela
- Coordinates: 9°16′N 71°08′W
- Country: Venezuela
- State: Zulia
- Muni.: Sucre

Population
  - Total: 4,000
- Time zone: UTC−4 (VET)

Gibraltar is a town located in Zulia State in Venezuela between Bobures to the south and Boscan to the north. It is on the shore of Maracaibo Lake. The population is around 4,000.

== History ==
It was founded as San Antonio de Gibraltar in February 1592 by Gonzalo Piña Ludueña and took its name from his home town, the then Spanish Gibraltar (now a British overseas territory). It was, during the colonial period, the most important harbour of the city of Mérida and a major center for the exportation of cocoa.

Gibraltar was taken and ransacked in 1668 by the French pirate François l'Olonnais and one year later by Henry Morgan. In 1678, Michel de Grammont captured and plundered the small town, penetrating as far inland as Trujillo. The damage was so severe that it had nearly ceased to exist by 1680.
