= François l'Olonnais =

17th-century French pirate

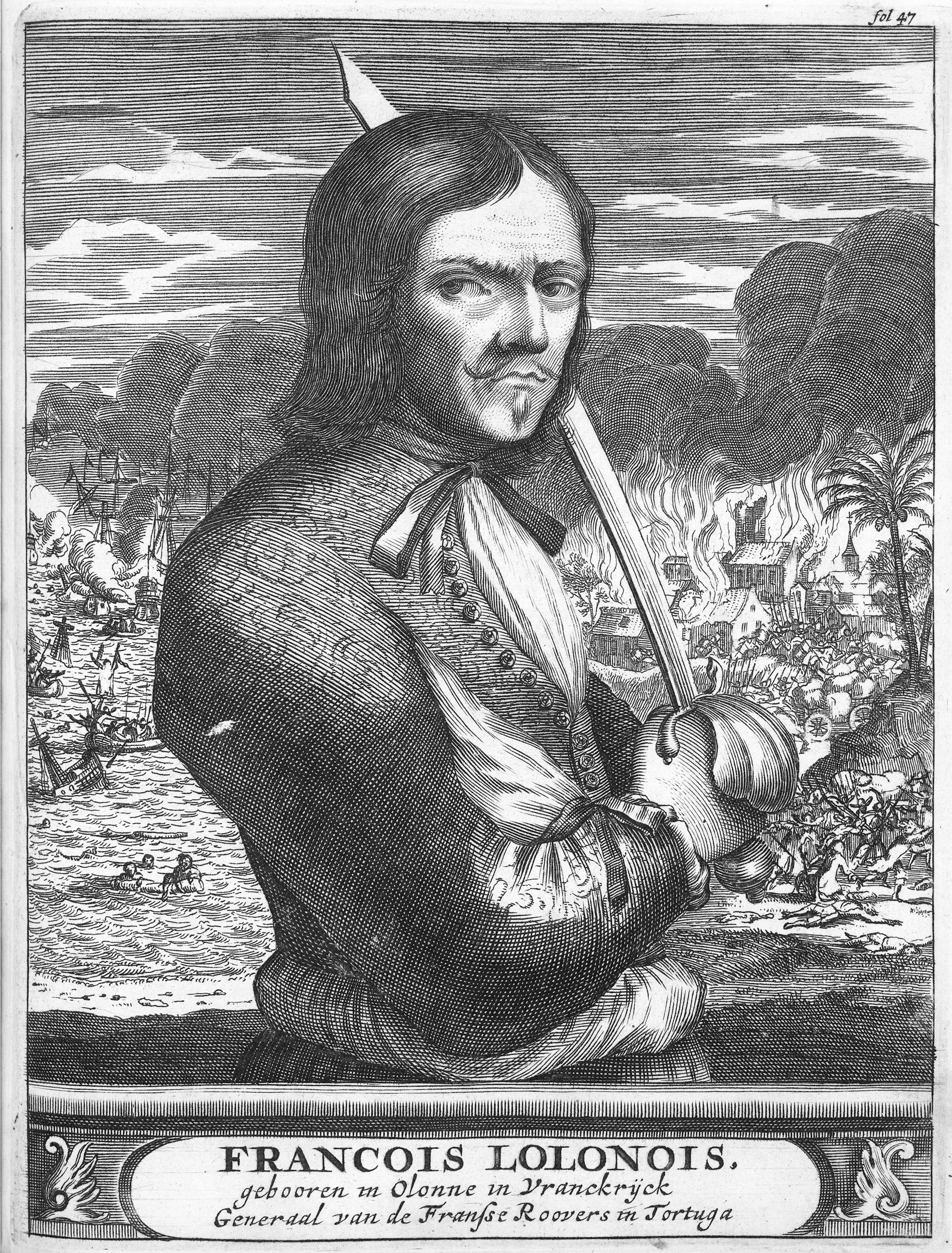
- An illustration of François l'Olonnais from a 1684 edition of The History of the Buccaneers of America
- Born: Jean-David Nau; 1630; Les Sables-d'Olonne, France
- Died: 1669 (aged 38–39); Darién Province, Panama
- Piratical career
- Nickname: Flail of the Spanish
- Type: Buccaneer
- Allegiance: None
- Years active: c. 1660 – c. 1668
- Rank: Captain
- Base of operations: Caribbean

Jean-David Nau (pronounced [ʒɑ̃ david no]) (c. 1630 – c. 1669), better known as François l'Olonnais (pronounced [fʁɑ̃swa lolɔnɛ]) (also l'Olonnois, Lolonois and Lolona), was a French pirate active in the Caribbean during the 1660s.

== Early life ==
According to Alexandre Exquemelin's 1684 account The History of the Buccaneers of America, l'Olonnais' was born in Les Sables-d'Olonne in France. He first arrived in the Caribbean as an indentured servant during the 1650s. By 1660 his servitude was complete. He began to wander various islands before arriving in Saint-Domingue – in what is now Haiti – and becoming a buccaneer. He preyed upon shipping from the Spanish West Indies and the Spanish Main.

A year or two (dates regarding l'Olonnais are uncertain) into his piratical career, l'Olonnais was shipwrecked near Campeche in Mexico. A party of Spanish soldiers attacked l'Olonnais and his crew, killing almost the entire party. L'Olonnais survived by covering himself in the blood of others and hiding amongst the dead.

After the Spanish departed, l'Olonnais, with the assistance of some escaped slaves, made his way to the island of Tortuga. A short time later, he and his crew held a town hostage, demanding a ransom from its Spanish rulers. The governor of Cuba, Francisco Oregón y Gascón, sent a ship to kill l'Olonnais' party. l'Olonnais captured and beheaded the ship's entire crew save one, whom he spared so that a message could be delivered to Havana: "I shall never henceforward give quarter to any Spaniard whatsoever."

== The sacking of Maracaibo ==
In 1666, l'Olonnais sailed from Tortuga with a fleet of eight ships and a crew of 440 pirates to sack Maracaibo in what is modern day Venezuela, joining forces with fellow buccaneer Michel le Basque. En route, l'Olonnais crossed paths with a Spanish treasure ship which he captured, along with its cargo of cocoa beans, gemstones, and more than 260,000 Spanish dollars.

At the time the entrance to Lake Maracaibo and thus the city itself was defended by the San Carlos de la Barra Fortress with sixteen guns, which was thought to be impregnable. He approached it from its undefended landward side and took it in few hours. He then proceeded to pillage the city, and found that most of the residents had fled and that their gold had been hidden. L'Olonnais' men tracked down the residents and tortured them until they revealed the location of their possessions. They also seized the fort's cannon and demolished most of the town's defence walls to ensure that a hasty retreat was possible.

Maracaibo, Cabimas, Ciudad Ojeda and Gibraltar

L'Olonnais himself was an expert torturer, and his techniques included slicing portions of flesh off the victim with a sword, burning them alive, or tying knotted "woolding" (rope bound around a ship's mast to strengthen it) around the victim's head until their eyes were forced out.

Over the following two months, l'Olonnais and his men tortured, pillaged, and eventually burned much of Maracaibo before moving to San Antonio de Gibraltar, on the eastern shore of Lake Maracaibo. Despite being outnumbered, the pirates slaughtered 500 soldiers of Gibraltar's garrison and held the city for ransom. Despite the payment of the ransom (20,000 pieces of eight and five hundred cattle), l'Olonnais continued to ransack the city, acquiring a total of 260,000 pieces of eight, gems, silverware, and silks, as well as a number of slaves. Word of his attack on Maracaibo and Gibraltar reached Tortuga, and l'Olonnais earned a reputation for his ferocity and cruelty. He was given the nickname "The Bane of Spain" (French: Fléau des Espagnols). He spent the following weeks plundering small fishermen villages, most of them inhabited by indigenous people. By burning their huts and stealing their canoes, l'Olonnais gained the hate of the natives.

== Expedition to Honduras ==
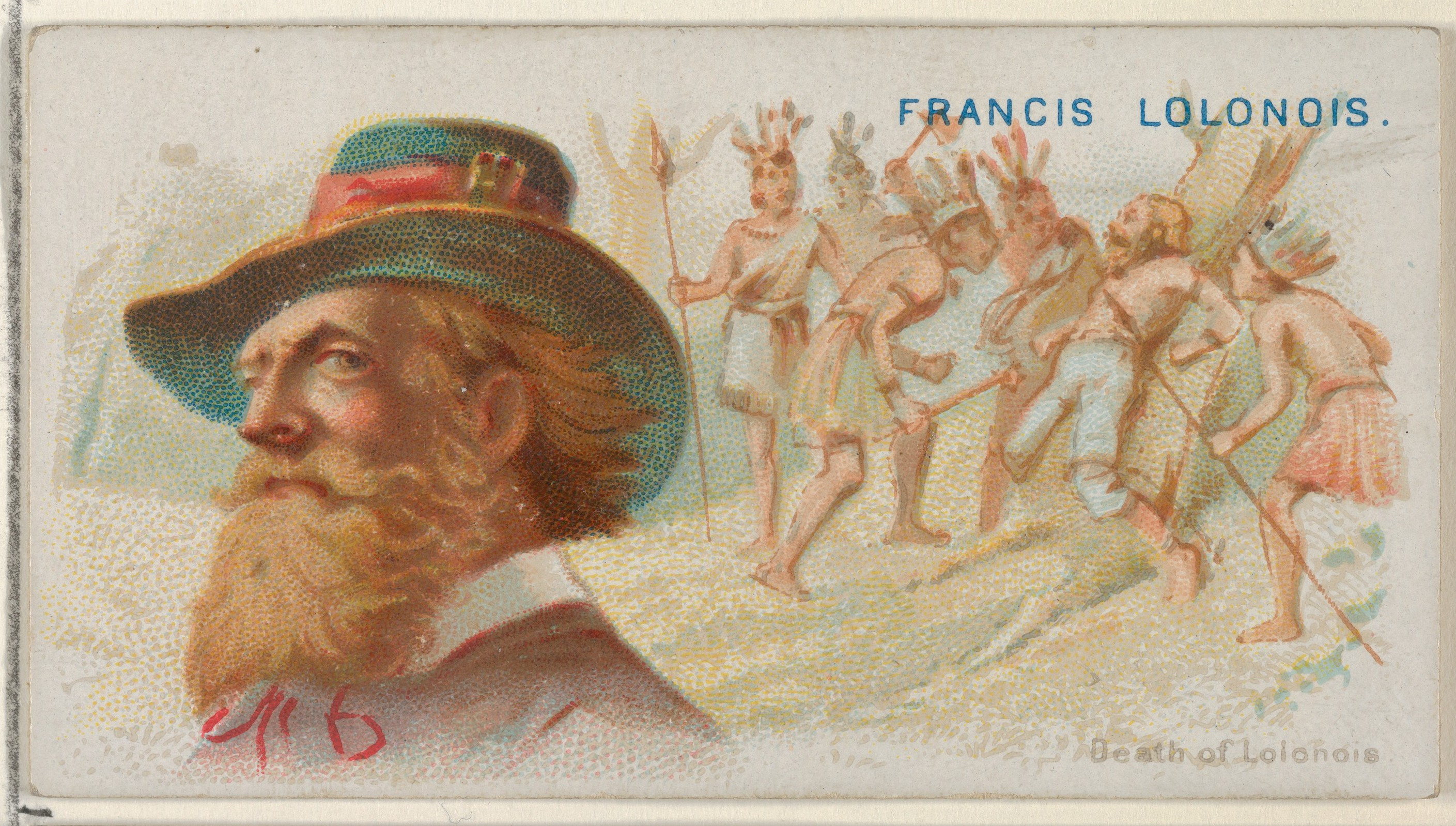
Francis Lolonois, Death of Lolonois, from the Pirates of the Spanish Main series (N19) for Allen & Ginter Cigarettes MET DP835031

Seven hundred pirates enlisted with l'Olonnais when he mounted his next expedition, this time to the Central American mainland. In 1667, after pillaging Puerto Cavallo on the coast of Honduras, l'Olonnais was ambushed by a large force of Spanish soldiers while en route to San Pedro. Only narrowly escaping with his life, l'Olonnais captured two Spaniards. Exquemelin wrote:

"'He drew his cutlass, and with it cut open the breast of one of those poor Spanish, and pulling out his heart with his sacrilegious hands, began to bite and gnaw it with his teeth, like a ravenous wolf, saying to the rest: I will serve you all alike, if you show me not another way".

Horrified, the surviving Spaniard showed l'Olonnais a clear route to San Pedro. L'Olonnais and the few men still surviving were repelled, and retreated back to their ship. They ran aground on a shoal on the Pearl keys from Nicaragua. Unable to dislodge their craft, they headed inland to find food. From here, he ran several operational attacks to Campeche, San Pedro Sula and Guatemala, and was trying to penetrate Nicaragua inland cities through the Nicaraguan river (now called El Rio Grande de Matagalpa). He was defeated and almost killed by the natives of the region. He escaped and went to Cartagena in Colombia, looking for food.

== Death ==
Around 1669, l'Olonnais was captured and killed by a group of indigenous Guna people from Darién, a modern-day province of Panama. Exquemelin wrote that the locals "tore him in pieces alive, throwing his body limb by limb into the fire and his ashes into the air; to the intent no trace nor memory might remain of such an infamous, inhuman creature." According to other accounts, parts of his body were eaten.

At some point before his death, he sailed briefly to Jamaica to sell off a prize ship. It was purchased in 1668 by Roc Brasiliano, who sailed with Jelles de Lecat against the Spanish alongside Henry Morgan.

== Legacy ==
L'Olonnais left a legacy of extreme brutality and fear in the Caribbean, particularly for his vicious raids on Spanish settlements, most notably in Maracaibo. His reputation as a savage, cruel leader, often torturing prisoners, solidified his place as one of the most feared buccaneers in history. He is remembered for his sadistic methods, frequently torturing, mutilating, or executing Spanish prisoners, which created widespread fear.

== In popular culture ==
The Japanese transliteration of l'Olonnois (Roronoa) served as inspiration for the name of Roronoa Zoro in the manga series One Piece. The appearance of another character in the series, the swordsman Dracule Mihawk, is likely based on L'Olonnais' 1684 portrait as well.

In the 1980 film The Island, it is revealed that a secret enclave of pirates had been in existence for three hundred years, after it was established by Jean-David Nau (also known as François l'Olonnais).

Furthermore, his South American exploits might have been partial inspiration for the Errol Flynn character, Geoffrey Thorp, in The Sea Hawk.

Nau is one of nine historical pirates who can be fought in Sid Meier's Pirates!

== See also ==
- List of incidents of cannibalism

== Bibliography and further reading ==
- Exquemelin, Alexandre. The History of the Bucaniers of America, 1684.
- Talty, Stephan. Empire of Blue Water: Captain Morgan's Great Pirate Army, the Epic Battle for the Americas, and the Catastrophe That Ended the Outlaws' Bloody Reign, 2007.
