= Alexandre Exquemelin =

French, Dutch or Flemish writer

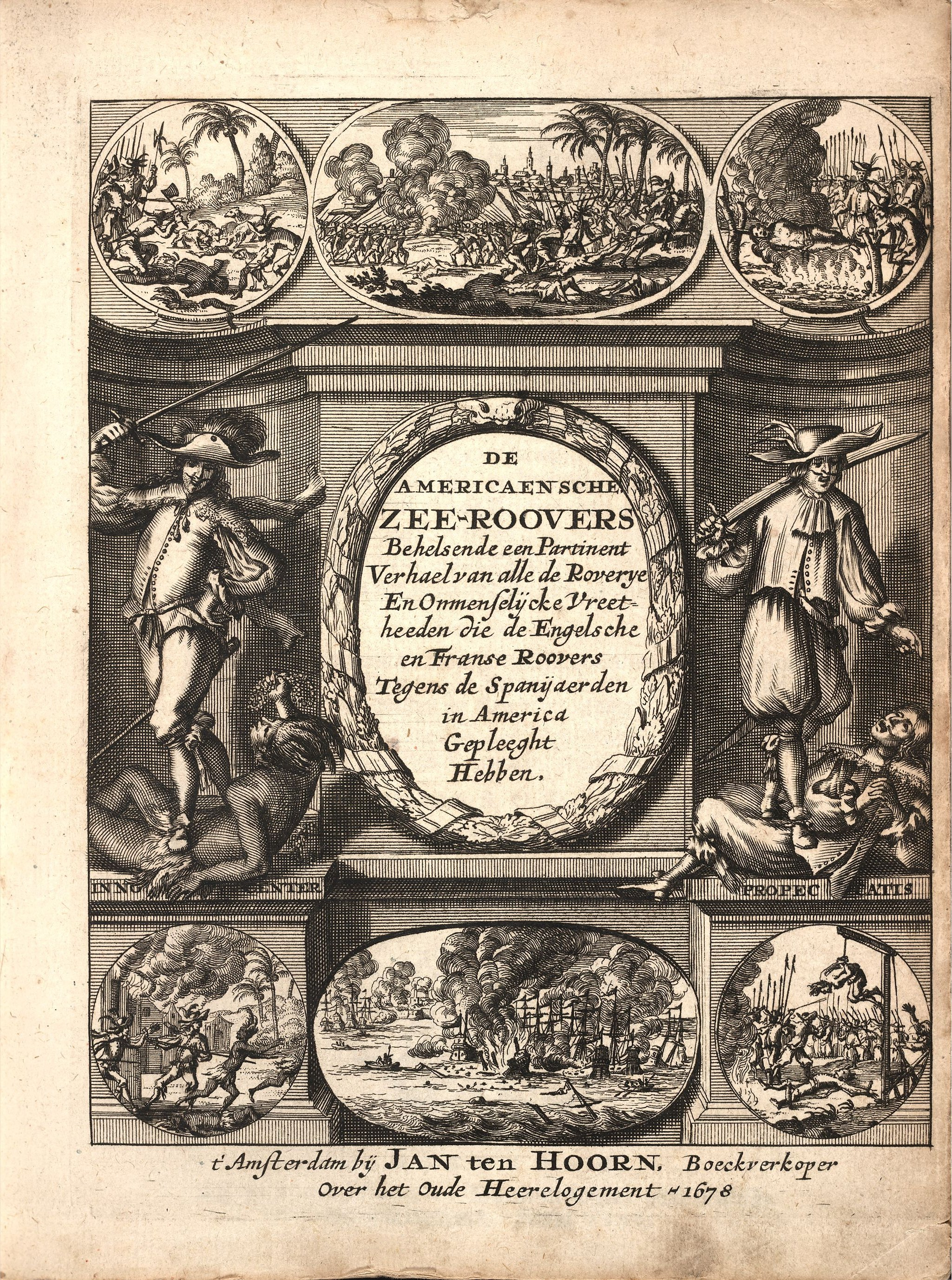
Frontispiece to 1st edition of Buccaneers of America, 1678

Alexandre Olivier Exquemelin (also spelled Esquemeling, Exquemeling, or Oexmelin) (c. 1645–1707) was a French, Dutch, or Flemish writer best known as the author of one of the most important sourcebooks of 17th-century piracy, first published in Dutch as De Americaensche Zee-Roovers, in Amsterdam, by Jan ten Hoorn, in 1678.

== Life ==
Born about 1645, it is likely that Exquemelin was a native of Honfleur, France, who on his return from buccaneering settled in Holland, possibly because he was a Huguenot. In 1666 he was engaged by the French West India Company and went to Tortuga, where he worked as an indentured servant for three years. There he enlisted with the buccaneers, in particular with the band of Henry Morgan, whose confidante he was, probably as a barber-surgeon, and remained with them until 1674. Shortly afterwards he returned to Europe and settled in Amsterdam where he qualified professionally as a surgeon, his name appearing on the 1679 register of the Dutch Surgeons' Guild. However, he was later once again in the Caribbean as his name appears on the muster-roll as a surgeon in the attack on Cartagena in 1697.

The bibliographic legacy of Exquemelin's History of the Buccaneers of America is complex. It was first published in Dutch (1678), then translated into German (1679), Spanish (1681) and English (1684). The German translation is a faithful translation of the original Dutch. The Spanish translation adds new material quite freely and without acknowledgment, and mistranslates the Dutch frequently, while the English translation appears to be as much a translation of the Spanish edition, including most of its deviations from the Dutch original. The French translation of 1686 is substantially a new work with many additions, including new pirate biographies (Daniel Montbars and Alexandre Bras-de-Fer) and complete rearrangements in some sections incorporating new material of unknown source. Subsequent editions and translations added additional new material and whole biographies.

Following publication of the English translation in 1684, Henry Morgan took steps to discredit the book and successfully brought a libel suit against the book's publishers William Crooke and Thomas Malthus. Morgan particularly objected to the description of the capture of the third castle at Portobello in 1668 where the book said he had ordered the construction of ladders wide enough for three men to climb abreast; when they were completed he "commanded all the religious men and women whom he had taken prisoners to fix them against the walls of the castle ... these were forced, at the head of the companies to raise and apply them to the walls ... Thus many of the religious men and nuns were killed". In Morgan's affidavit he stated that he had "against evil deeds, piracies and robberies the greatest abhorrence and distrust", and that "for the kind of men called buccaneers", he "always had and still has hatred". The court found in his favour and the book was retracted; damages of £200 were paid to him. The passage about the use of nuns and monks as a human shield was retracted from subsequent publications in England.

For a comparison of the 1678 Dutch edition and the 1686 French translation, see the 1974 translation and interpretation by the Danish author and historian Erik Kjærsgaard. For a contemporary reprinting, see Esquemeling, Alexander O., The Buccaneers of America. A true account of the most remarkable assaults committed of late years upon the coasts of West Indies by the Buccaneers of Jamaica and Tortuga (both English and French), containing also Basil Ringrose's account of the dangerous voyage and bold assaults of Captain Bartholomew Sharp and others. Peter Benchley, in his book The Island, referred to Exquemelin at length, having used his work in his research.
