= Buccaneer =

17th/18th century Caribbean privateers

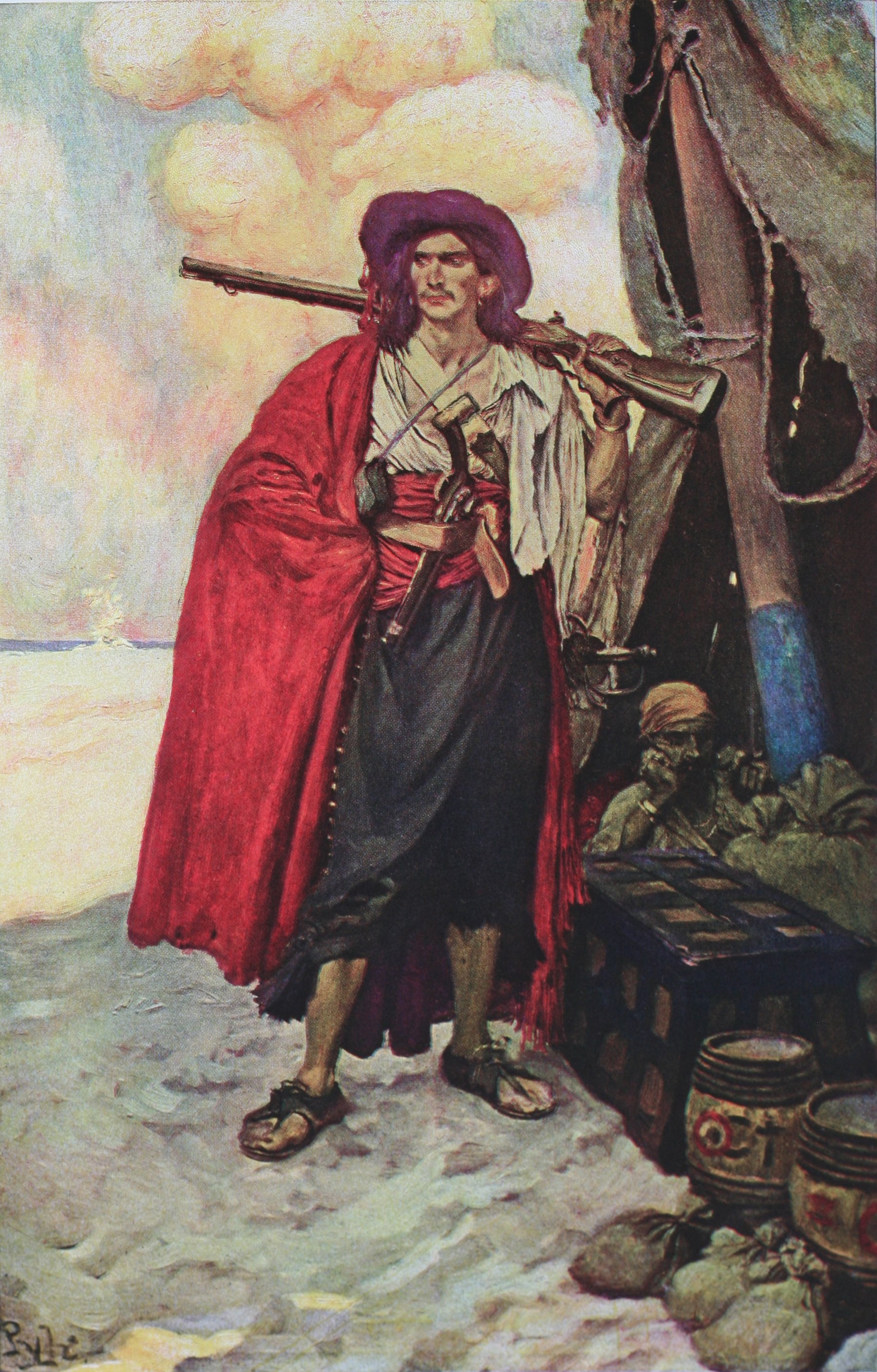
"Buccaneer of the Caribbean" from Howard Pyle's Book of Pirates.

Buccaneers were privateers and pirates operating in the Caribbean Sea during the 17th and 18th centuries. First established as early as 1625 on northwestern side of Hispaniola after the devastations of Osorio, their heyday was from the Restoration in 1660 until about 1688, during a time when governments in the Caribbean area were not strong enough to suppress them. Martinique was a home port for French buccaneers as well as pirates like Captain Crapeau.

Originally the name applied to the landless hunters of wild boars and cattle in the largely uninhabited areas of Tortuga and Hispaniola. The meat they caught was smoked over a slow fire in little huts the French called boucans to make viande boucanée – jerked meat or jerky – which they sold to the corsairs who preyed on the (largely Spanish) shipping and settlements of the Caribbean. Eventually the term was applied to the corsairs and (later) privateers themselves, also known as the Brethren of the Coast. Although corsairs, also known as filibusters or freebooters, were largely lawless, privateers were nominally licensed by the authorities – first the French, later the English and Dutch – to prey on the Spanish, until their depredations became so severe they were suppressed.

== Etymology ==
The term buccaneer derives from the Caribbean Arawak word buccan, which refers to a wooden frame on which Tainos and Caribs slowly roasted or smoked meat, commonly manatee. The word was adopted into French as boucan, hence the name boucanier for French hunters who used such frames to smoke meat from feral cattle and pigs on the western part of Hispaniola after the devastations of Osorio. English colonists anglicised boucanier to buccaneer.

== History ==
About 1630, French interlopers were driven away from the island of Hispaniola and fled to nearby Tortuga. French buccaneers were established on northern Hispaniola as early as 1625, but lived at first mostly as hunters rather than robbers; their transition to full-time piracy was gradual and motivated in part by Spanish efforts to wipe out both the buccaneers and the prey animals on which they depended. The buccaneers' migration from Hispaniola's mainland to the more defensible offshore island of Tortuga limited their resources and accelerated their piratical raids. According to Alexandre Exquemelin, the Tortuga buccaneer Pierre Le Grand pioneered the settlers' attacks on galleons making the return voyage to Spain. The Spaniards also tried to drive them out of Tortuga, but the buccaneers were joined by many more French, Dutch, and English adventurers who turned to piracy. They set their eyes on Spanish shipping, generally using small craft to attack galleons in the vicinity of the Windward Passage. With the support and encouragement of rival European powers, they became strong enough to sail for the mainland of Spanish America, known as the Spanish Main, and sacked cities.

Perhaps what distinguished the buccaneers from earlier Caribbean sailors was their use of permanent bases in the West Indies. During the mid 17th century, the Bahama Islands attracted many lawless people who had taken over New Providence. Encouraged by its large harbour, they were joined by several pirates who made their living by raiding the Spanish on the coast of Cuba. They called this activity buccaneering. Their principal station was Tortuga, but from time to time they seized other strongholds, like Providence, and they were welcomed with their booty in ports like Port Royal in Jamaica. At first they were international. In 1663 it was estimated that there were fifteen of their ships with nearly a thousand men, English, French, and Dutch, belonging to Jamaica and Tortuga. As time went on and the European governments asserted their authority, the buccaneers first became separated by nationalities and then in time were suppressed altogether, leaving behind only dispersed bands of pirates.

The French buccaneers and settlers from Paris established a settlement which has now occupied Martinique, the French word for buccaneer was "boucanier," which directly relates to the island as the term originates from the Caribbean Arawak word "buccan," especially for the French pirates like Étienne de Montauban and Mathurin Desmarestz.

English settlers occupying Jamaica began to spread the name buccaneers with the meaning of pirates. The name became universally adopted later in 1684 when the first English translation of Alexandre Exquemelin's book The Buccaneers of America was published.

Viewed from London, buccaneering was a budget way to wage war on England's rival, Spain. The English crown licensed buccaneers with letters of marque, legalising their operations in return for a share of their profits. The buccaneers were invited by Jamaica's Governor Thomas Modyford to base ships at Port Royal. The buccaneers robbed Spanish shipping and colonies, and returned to Port Royal with their plunder, making the city the most prosperous in the Caribbean. There were even Royal Navy officers sent to lead the buccaneers, such as Christopher Myngs. Their activities went on irrespective of whether England happened to be at war with Spain or France.

Among the leaders of the buccaneers were two Frenchmen, Jean-David Nau, better known as François l'Ollonais, and Daniel Montbars, who destroyed so many Spanish ships and killed so many Spaniards that he was called "the Exterminator".

Another noted leader was Welshman Henry Morgan, who sacked Maracaibo, Portobello, and Panama City, stealing a huge amount from the Spanish. Morgan became rich and went back to England, where he was knighted by Charles II.

While the buccaneers were powerful it was not only hostility to Spain, but also lack of authority, that prevented the other states from ending the old state of affairs in which, even when they were at peace with Spain and Portugal in Europe, there was 'no peace beyond the Line'. The West Indies were beyond the range of the European international system. Sometimes this was for their advantage but on the whole, with the intermingled possessions, trade rivalries, and disputes about territorial rights, the local conditions led to conflicts. The West Indies continued to be one of the centres of international strife throughout the eighteenth century although by that time it was regulated in the same way as in Europe, and had become inseparable from the European wars.

During the Second Anglo-Dutch War in 1665, de Ruyter attacked Barbados with a strong squadron, and the English had no choice but to base their defence on the buccaneers whom the governor of Jamaica had previously been trying to suppress. They were unmanageable and destroyed where they conquered, but they mastered the Dutch colonies of St. Eustatius and Tobago. In 1666, however, when the French joined the Dutch in the war, the weakness of this policy was proved. The English hoped to capture the French plantations of St. Kitts, where there were new settlers of both nations, and so they declined to make a new agreement for neutrality. They made what was intended to be a surprise attack, but was an ignominious failure, and the English settlers in the island had to surrender unconditionally. More than 8,000 of them were shipped away, and their property was seized by the French. Lord Willoughby, the able governor of Barbados, got together an expedition for a counter-stroke, but his fleet was broken up by a hurricane in which he perished. The French captured one island after another. In 1667 naval ships from England regained the command of the sea and made various conquests, but the Peace of Breda re-established the status quo in March of that year.

Henry Morgan was knighted in 1674 and became lieutenant-governor of Jamaica. In the late 1670s there was a succession of raids on Spanish ports. In 1680 a party made its way across the Isthmus of Panama and, sailing in captured Spanish ships, pillaged the coasts and commerce of the Pacific. They had not been long on their journey when the Anglo-Spanish treaty of 1680 was signed, which at last stipulated for a real peace beyond the Line and indirectly recognised the right of the English to trade in West Indian waters. When the buccaneers returned by way of Cape Horn in 1682, the survivors found themselves treated as pirates. The French, within a very few years, also controlled their buccaneers, and in the Nine Years' War (1688-1697) they were no longer an important factor. Until about 1688 the governments were not strong enough, and did not consistently attempt, to suppress the buccaneers.

In January 1684, Havana responded to the attacks by the buccaneers of the Bahamas in the event known as the Raid on Charles Town.

In the 1690s, the old buccaneering ways began to die out, as European governments began to discard the policy of "no peace beyond the Line". Buccaneers were hard to control; some even embroiled their colonies in unwanted wars. Notably, at the 1697 joint French-buccaneer siege of Cartagena, led by Bernard Desjean, Baron de Pointis, the buccaneers and the French regulars parted on extremely bitter terms. Less tolerated by local Caribbean officials, buccaneers increasingly turned to legal work or else joined regular pirate crews who sought plunder in the Indian Ocean, the east coast of North America, or West Africa as well as in the Caribbean.

== Legal status ==
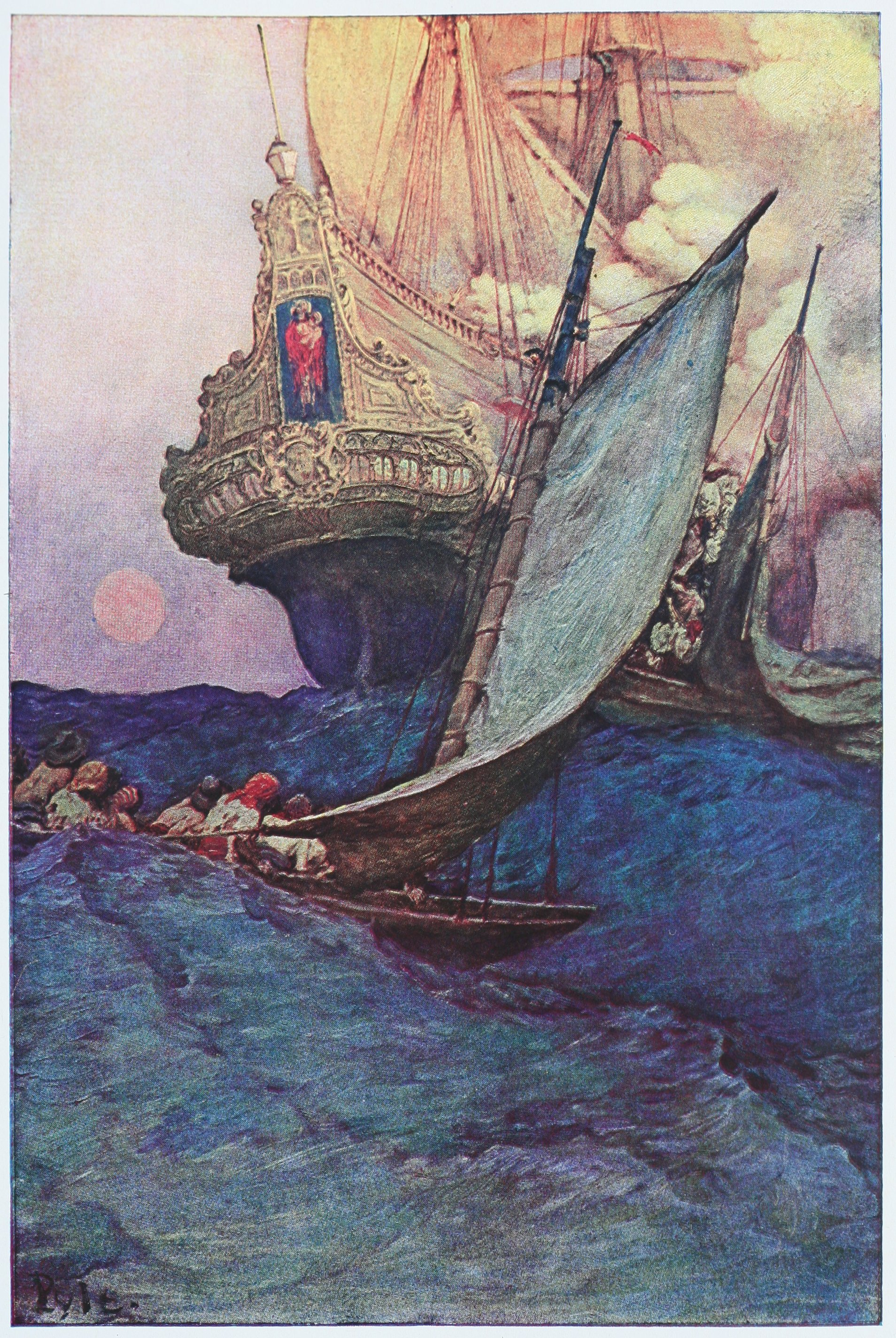
Howard Pyle – Buccaneers attacking a much larger Spanish galleon

Sometimes the buccaneers held more or less regular commissions as privateers, and they always preyed upon the Spaniards; but often they became mere pirates and plundered any nation. As a rule, the buccaneers called themselves privateers, and many sailed under the protection of a letter of marque granted by British, French or Dutch authorities. For example, Henry Morgan had some form of legal cover for all of his attacks, and expressed great indignation at being called a "corsair" by the governor of Panama. Nevertheless, these rough men had little concern for legal niceties, and exploited every opportunity to pillage Spanish targets, whether or not a letter of marque was available. Many of the letters of marque used by buccaneers were legally invalid, and any form of legal paper in that illiterate age might be passed off as a letter of marque. Furthermore, even those buccaneers who had valid letters of marque often failed to observe their terms. The legal status of buccaneers was still further obscured by the practice of the Spanish authorities, who regarded them as heretics and interlopers, and thus hanged or garroted captured buccaneers entirely without regard to whether their attacks were licensed by French or English monarchs.

Simultaneously, French and English governors tended to turn a blind eye to the buccaneers' depredations against the Spanish, even when unlicensed. But as Spanish power waned toward the end of the 17th century, the buccaneers' attacks began to disrupt France and England's merchant traffic with Spanish America, such that merchants who had previously regarded the buccaneers as a defence against Spain now saw them as a threat to commerce, and colonial authorities grew hostile. This change in political atmosphere, more than anything else, put an end to buccaneering.

== Lifestyle ==
A hundred years before the French Revolution, the buccaneer companies were run on lines in which liberty, equality and fraternity were the rule. In a buccaneer camp, the captain was elected and could be deposed by the votes of the crew. The crew, and not the captain, decided whether to attack a particular ship, or a fleet of ships. Spoils were evenly divided into shares; the captain received an agreed amount for the ship, plus a portion of the share of the prize money, usually five or six shares.

Crews generally had no regular wages, being paid only from their shares of the plunder, a system called "no purchase, no pay" by Modyford or "no prey, no pay" by Enqueueing. There was a strong esprit among buccaneers. This, combined with overwhelming numbers, allowed them to win battles and raids. There was also, for some time, a social insurance system guaranteeing compensation for battle wounds at a worked-out scale.

== Warfare ==
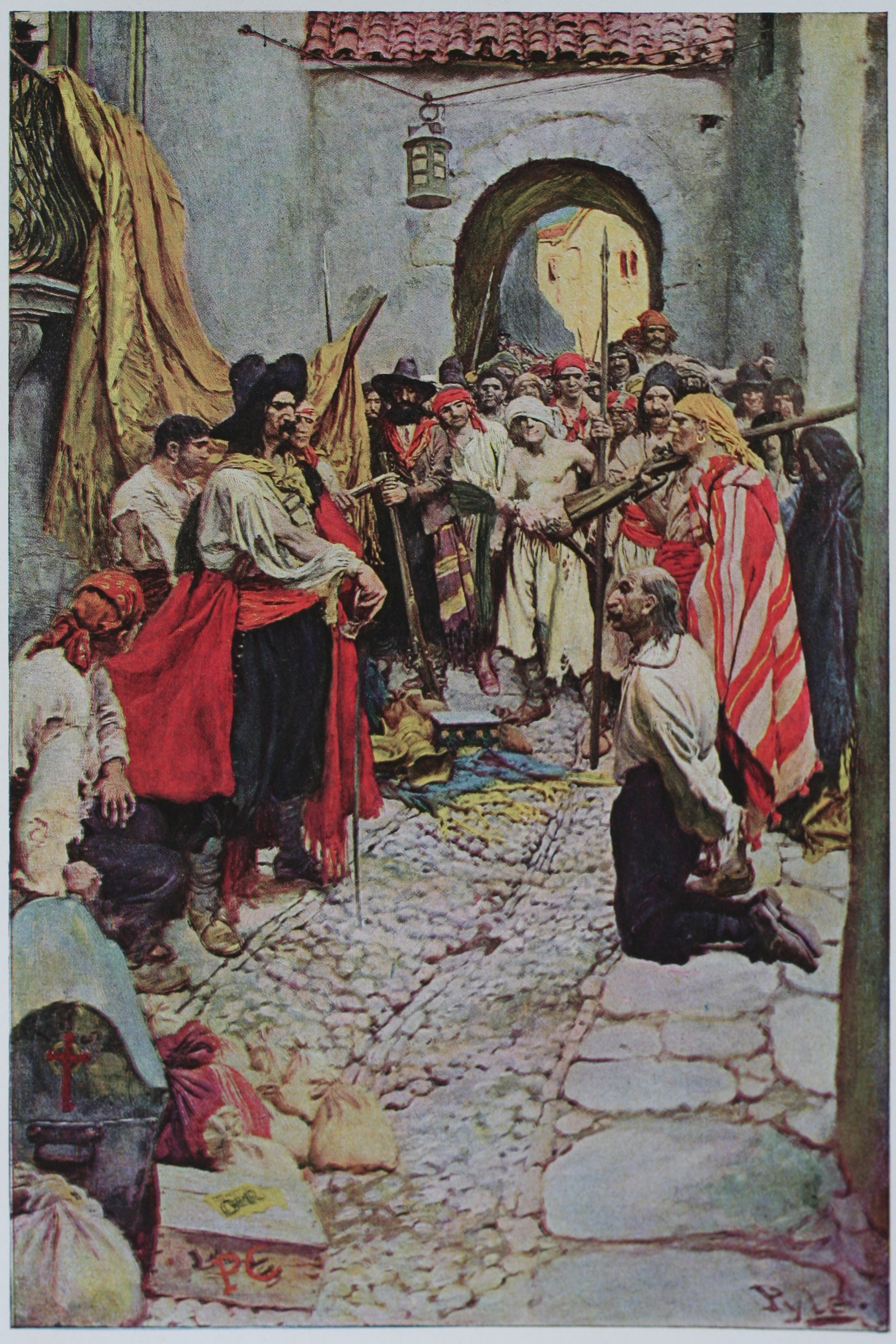
Howard Pyle – Buccaneers extorting tribute from the citizens of a captured city.

=== Naval ===
Buccaneers initially used small boats to attack Spanish galleons surreptitiously, often at night, and climb aboard before the alarm could be raised. Buccaneers were expert marksmen and would quickly kill the helmsman and any officers aboard. Buccaneers' reputation as cruel pirates grew to the point that, eventually, most victims would surrender, hoping they would not be killed.

=== Land ===
When buccaneers raided towns, they did not sail into port and bombard the defences, as naval forces typically did. Instead, they secretly beached their ships out of sight of their target, marched overland, and attacked the towns from the landward side, which was usually less fortified. Their raids relied mainly on surprise and speed. The sack of Campeche was considered the first such raid and many others that followed replicated the same techniques including the attack on Veracruz in 1683 and the raid on Cartagena later that same year.

== Downturn ==
Spanish authorities always viewed buccaneers as trespassers and a threat to their hegemony in the Caribbean basin, and over the second half of the 17th century, other European powers learned to perceive them in the same way. These new powers had appropriated and secured territories in the area and needed to protect them. Buccaneers who did not settle down on agriculture or some other acceptable business after the so-called Golden Age of Piracy proved a nuisance to them, too. Spanish anti-pirate practices became thus a model for all recently arrived colonial governments. Some expanded them.

== Punishments ==
When caught by anti-pirate English authorities, 17th and 18th century buccaneers received justice in a summary fashion, and many ended their lives by "dancing the hempen jig", a euphemism for hanging. Public executions were a form of entertainment, and people came out to watch them as they would for a sporting event today. Newspapers reported details such as condemned men's last words, the prayers said by the priests, and descriptions of their final moments in the gallows. In England, most executions took place at Execution Dock on the River Thames in London.

In the cases of more famous prisoners, usually captains, their punishments extended beyond death. Their bodies were enclosed in iron cages (for which they were measured before their execution) and left to swing in the air until the flesh rotted off them—a process that could take as long as two years. The bodies of captains such as William "Captain" Kidd, Charles Vane, William Fly, and John Rackham were all treated this way.

It is doubtful many buccaneers got off with just a time in the pillory. However, a pirate who was flogged could very well spend some time in the pillory after being beaten. "The most common shaming punishment was confinement in the pillory often with symbols of their crimes."

== In literature ==
After the threat began to abate, literature brought buccaneers to glory as example of virility and self-reliance. Daniel Defoe’s works like Robinson Crusoe (1719), Captain Singleton (1720), and A General History of the Pyrates (1724) (purportedly written by Defoe) set the tone for the glamorous ways in which later generations would perceive them.

Rafael Sabatini's 1922 adventure novel Captain Blood portrays a physician who is unjustly forced into a life of buccaneering in the Caribbean.

== See also ==
- Pierre le Grand (pirate)
- Piracy in the Caribbean
- William Dampier
- Tampa Bay Buccaneers
